= Mermaid Monument =

Mermaid Monument may refer to:

- Warsaw, Poland
  - Mermaid Monument (Old Town, Warsaw)
  - Mermaid Monument (Powiśle)
- Copenhagen, Denmark
  - The Little Mermaid (statue)
