= Mermaid of Warsaw =

Symbol of Warsaw, Poland

The current coat of arms of Warsaw

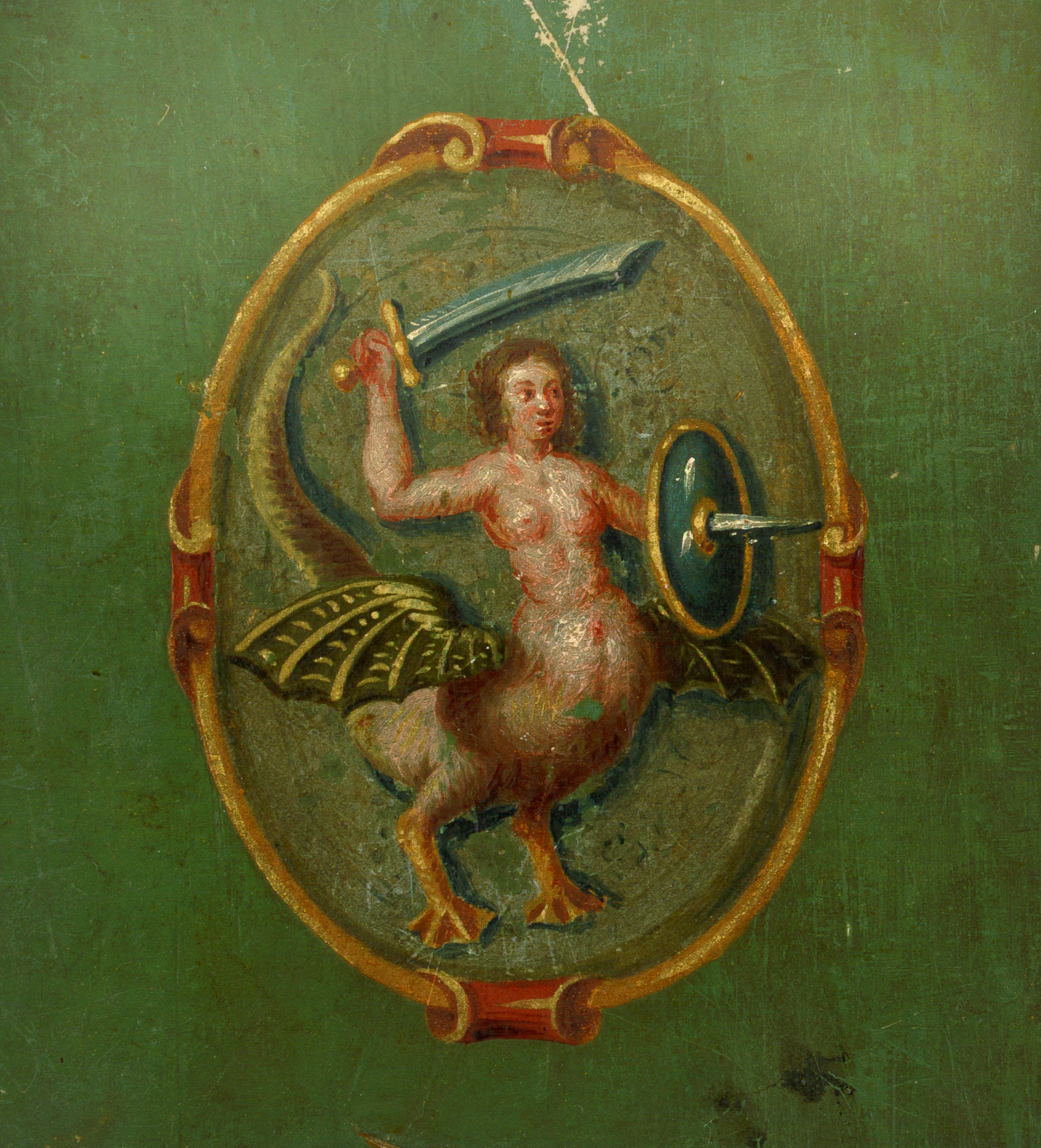
The coat of arms of Old Warsaw is located on the cover of the book "Regestrum proventuum et expensorum civitatis antiq [ue] varsaviae" from 1652

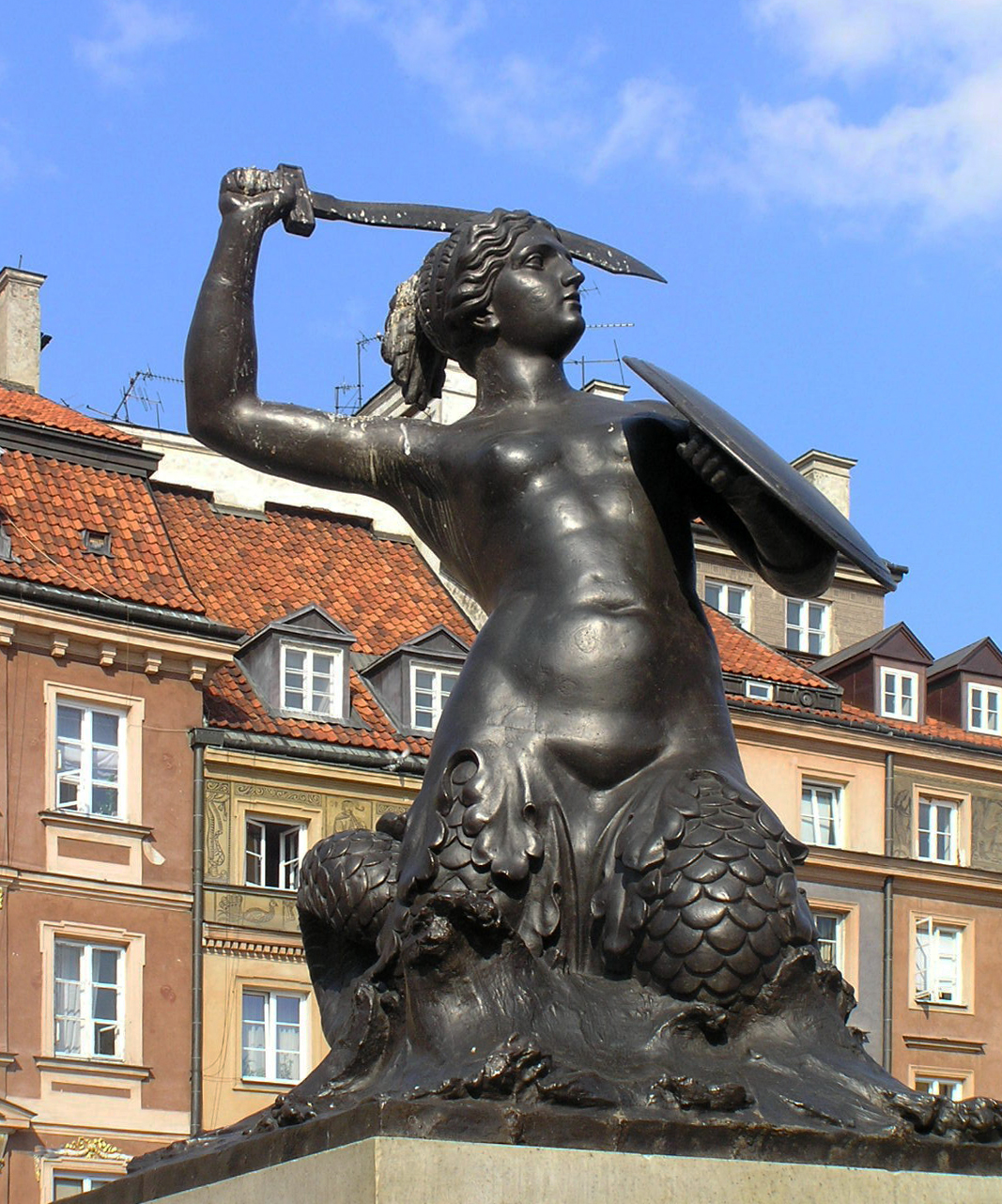
The Mermaid Monument at the Old Town Market Place

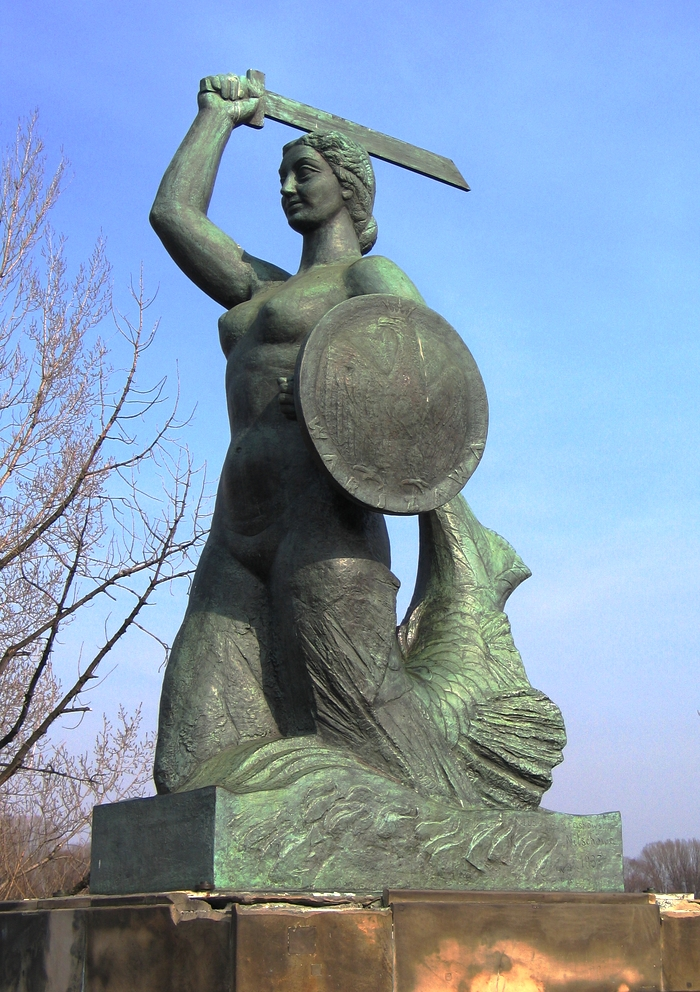
The mermaid on the Vistula river

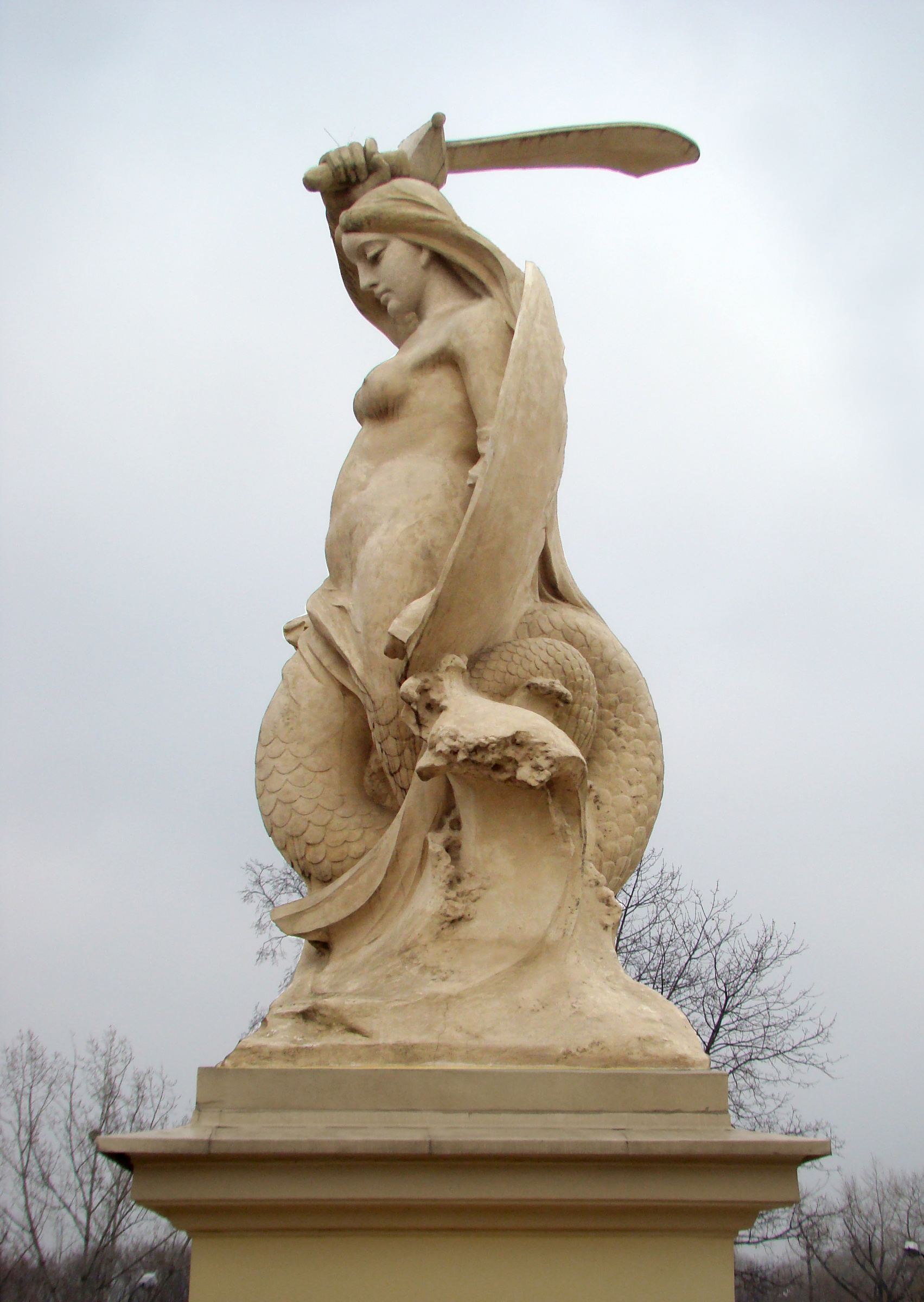
The mermaid at the Stanisław Markiewicz viaduct

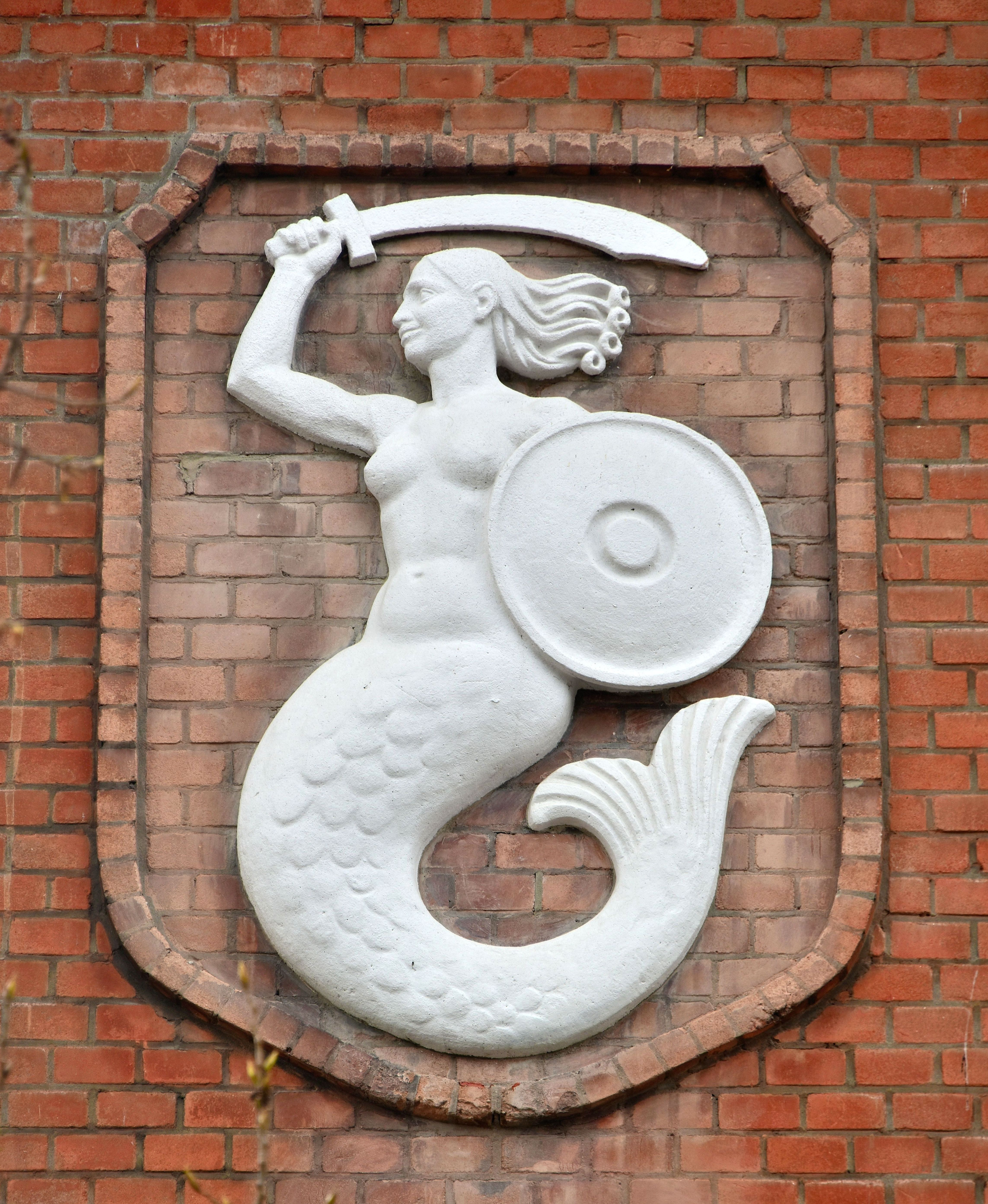
The mermaid by Wojciech Czerwosz

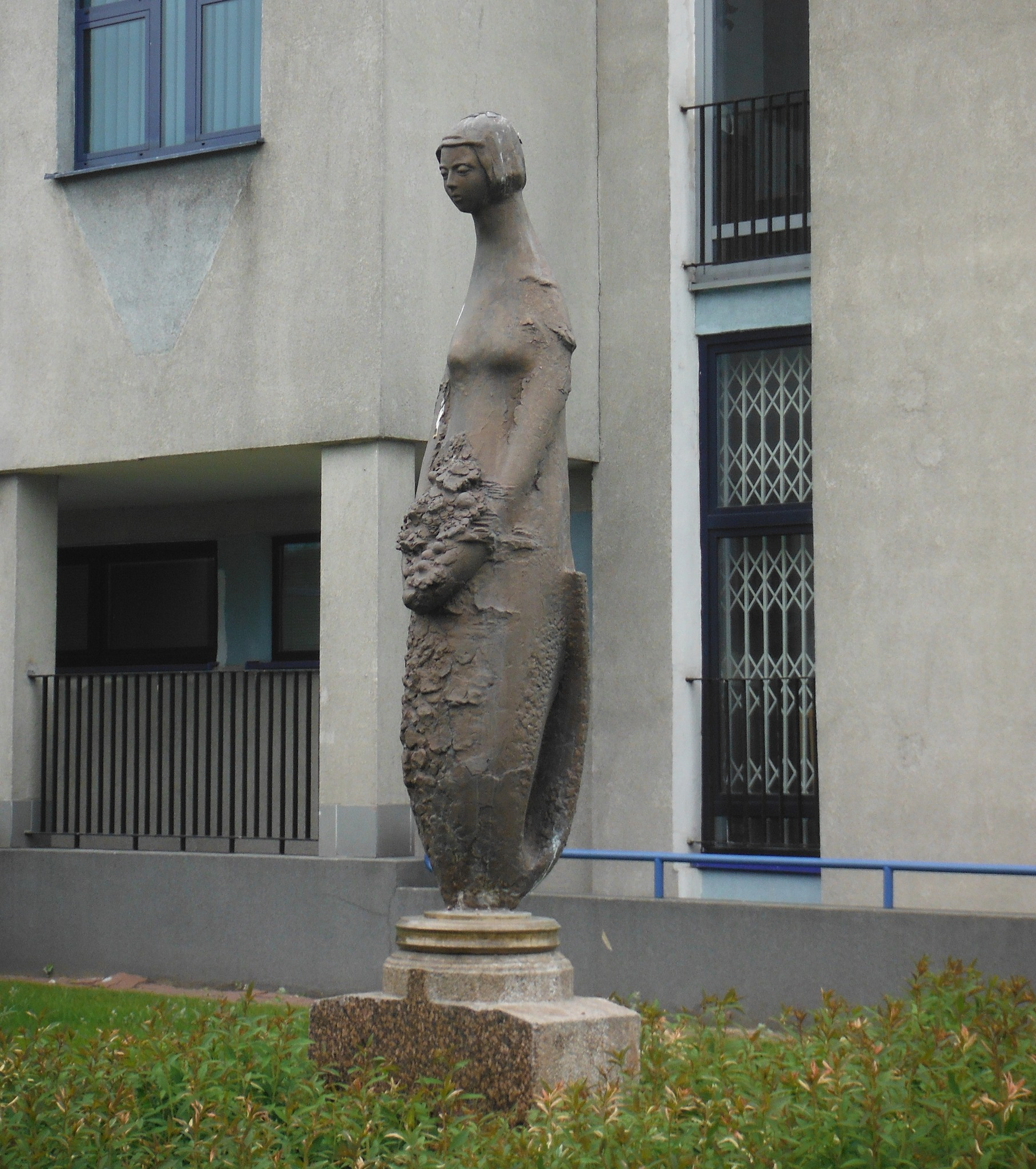
The mermaid by Jerzy Chojnacki

The Mermaid of Warsaw (Polish: Syrenka Warszawska) is a symbol of Warsaw, represented on the city's coat of arms as well as in a number of statues and other imagery.

== Etymology ==
Polish syrenka is a cognate of siren, but she is more properly a fresh-water mermaid called melusina.

A mermaid is a mythical sea creature with the lower body of a fish and the upper body of a woman. Often depicted with long hair, mermaids were known to sing haunting melodies which would draw passing ships onto rocks.

A melusina is a mythical freshwater winged and fish-tailed spirit who lives in rivers or wells.

== Origin ==
A creature was on Warsaw's coat of arms in 1390. It showed an animal with a bird's legs and a torso covered with dragon scales. The seal of 1459 had feminine characteristics, a bird torso, human hands, a fishtail, and bird legs and claws. The first presentation of a mermaid dates from 1622.

The inspiration for the coat of arms was probably derived from the 2nd-century book Physiologus.

== The legend of the Warsaw mermaid ==
There are several legends about the mermaid. The City's literature and tour guides say the mermaid decided to stay after stopping on a riverbank near the Old Town. Fishermen noticed something was creating waves, tangling nets, and releasing their fish. They planned to trap the animal, then heard her singing and fell in love. A rich merchant trapped and imprisoned the mermaid. Hearing her cries, the fishermen rescued her. Ever since, the mermaid, armed with a sword and a shield, has been ready to help protect the city and its residents.

Sometimes this legend is expanded to say the Little Mermaid in Copenhagen is the Warsaw mermaid's sister and they went separate ways from the Baltic Sea.

Another states she helped a prince lost hunting and he founded the city in her honour.

== Monuments and carvings of the Warsaw mermaid ==
Examples include:

=== The Old Town Market Place ===
The sculpture in Warsaw's Old Town Square was designed by Varsovian sculptor Konstanty Hegel.

Originally (1855–1928) and now (since 2000) it stands in the marketplace. At other times, it was moved to different places in Warsaw. In 2008, the original sculpture made of bronzed zinc was taken from the market for maintenance work. The sculpture was in a very poor condition due to mechanical damage and numerous acts of vandalism. The repaired original was transferred to the Museum of Warsaw, and replaced with a copy of made by the Jacek Guzera foundry in Dąbrowie near Kielce.

=== Powiśle ===
This statue, made of gunmetal, was erected in April 1939 in Powiśle near the Vistula river. The sculpture is by Ludwika Nitschowa and posed by poet Krystyna Krahelska. Originally, it was to be a 20-metre high sculpture made of glass, placed on a pillar in the middle of the Vistula channel. For financial reasons, this idea was abandoned, opting for a more modest solution - a sculpture surrounded by fish and seagulls, which was to be set up in a fountain.

The monument was not on the list of objects intended by the Germans for dismantling, it was also one of the few that survived World War II without major damage.

In autumn of 2006, a silver plaque of the Virtuti Militari was added to the monument for General Sikorski who was awarded it in recognition of his defence of Warsaw in September 1939.

=== The Markiewicz viaduct ===
A mermaid sculpted by Jan Woydyga was erected on the Stanislaw Markiewicz viaduct in Karowa Street in 1905.

=== The Sejm ===
A mermaid designed by Alexander Żurakowski in 1947 was engraved onto the shield on the breast of a statue of an eagle located in the main meeting hall of the Polish parliament, the Sejm.

=== Inżynierska Street ===
This mermaid is over the entrance to the former tram depot on 6 Inżynierska Street.

=== Katowicka Street ===
Located on the building of School No. 35 on the corner of Katowicka and Zwycięzców streets in Saska Kępa, the bas-relief is by Wojciech Czerwosz.

=== Grochowska Street ===
This mermaid is in front of the district office of the Warsaw borough of Praga-Południe at 274 Grochowska Street, and was made by Jerzy Chojnacki. It originally stood in Saska Kępa, in front of the Sawa movie theatre.

=== The Palace of Culture and Science ===
At the top of the Palace of Culture and Science, on each clock face (which were added prior to millennium celebrations in 2000), there is the Warsaw mermaid.

=== Outside Warsaw ===
A memorial fountain of the Warsaw mermaid with a similar shape to the monument in Powiśle is located in the central square of Bielsko-Biała. It was created in 1954 by Ryszard Sroczyński.

== Gallery ==
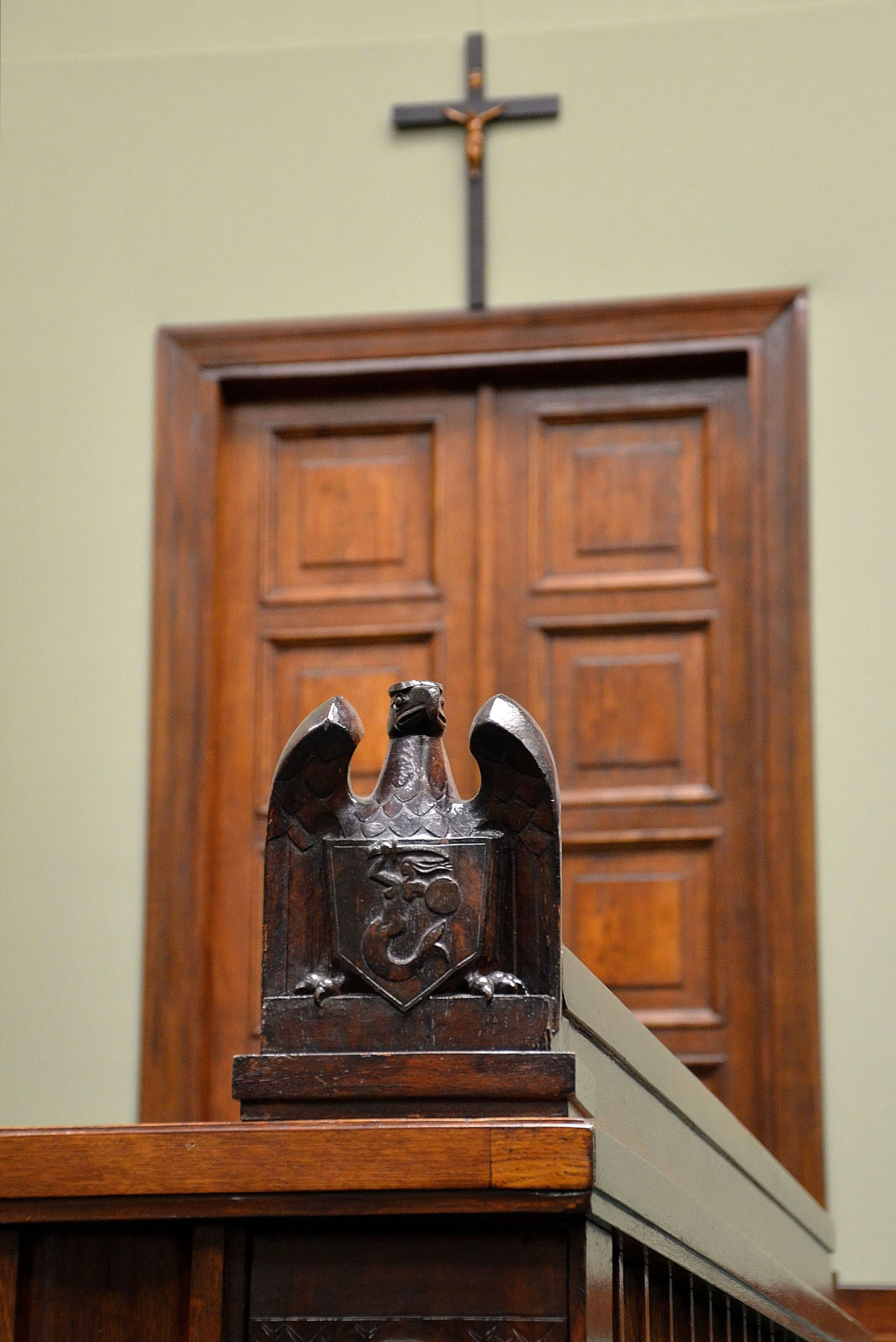
The mermaid in the Polish parliament, the Sejm

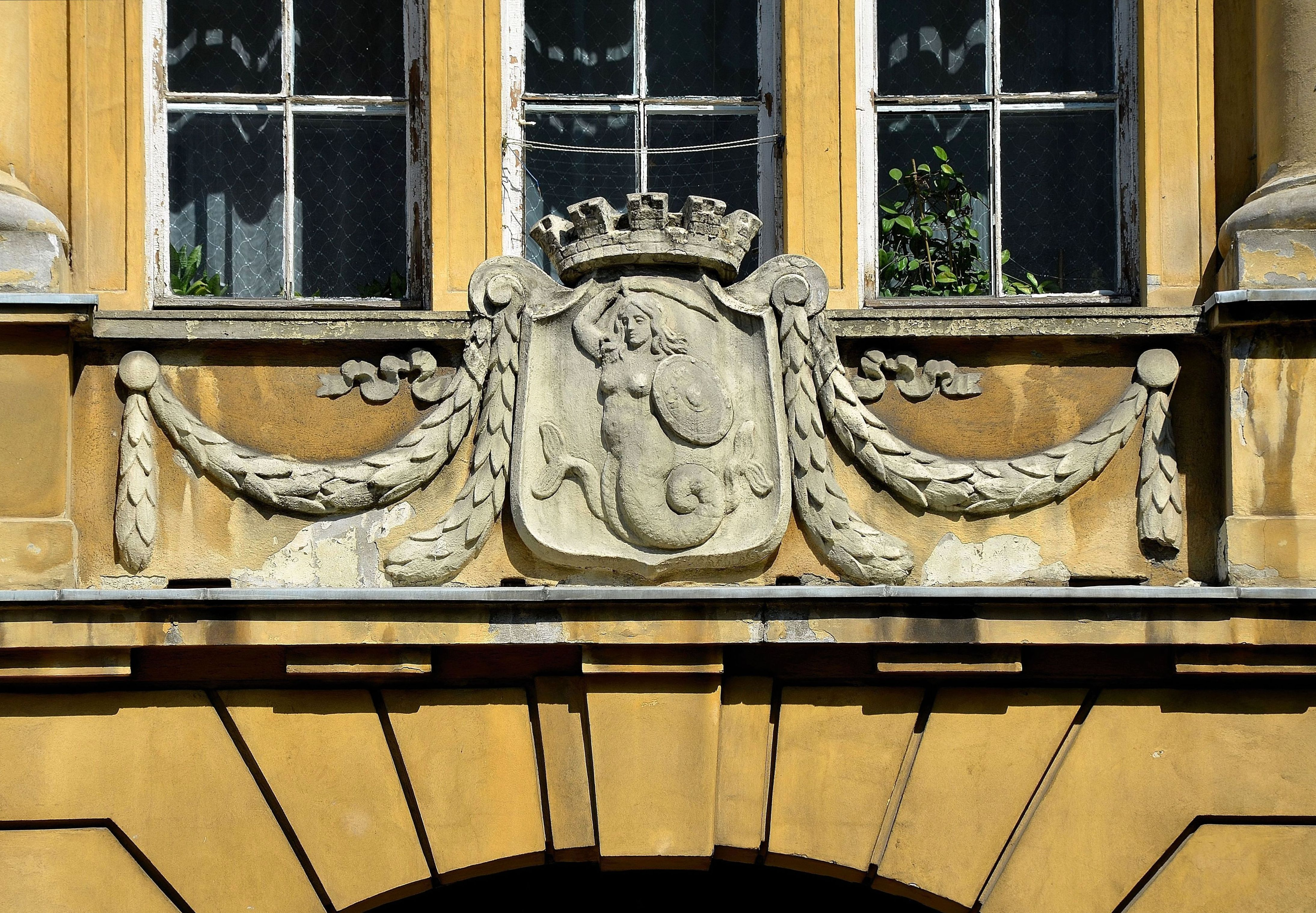
The mermaid on Inżynierska Street

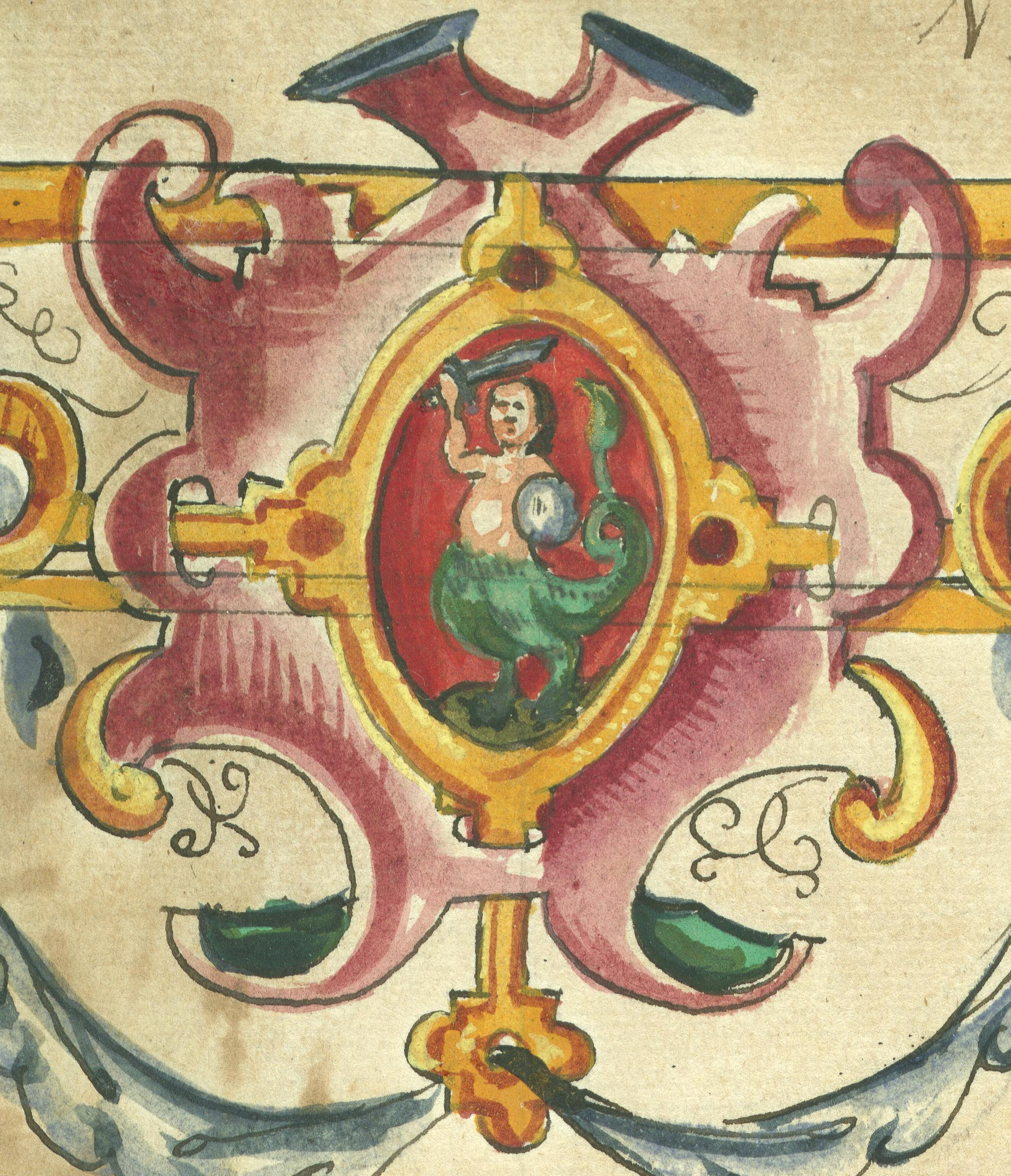
The Warsaw mermaid on the title page of a ledger of Old Warsaw in 1609

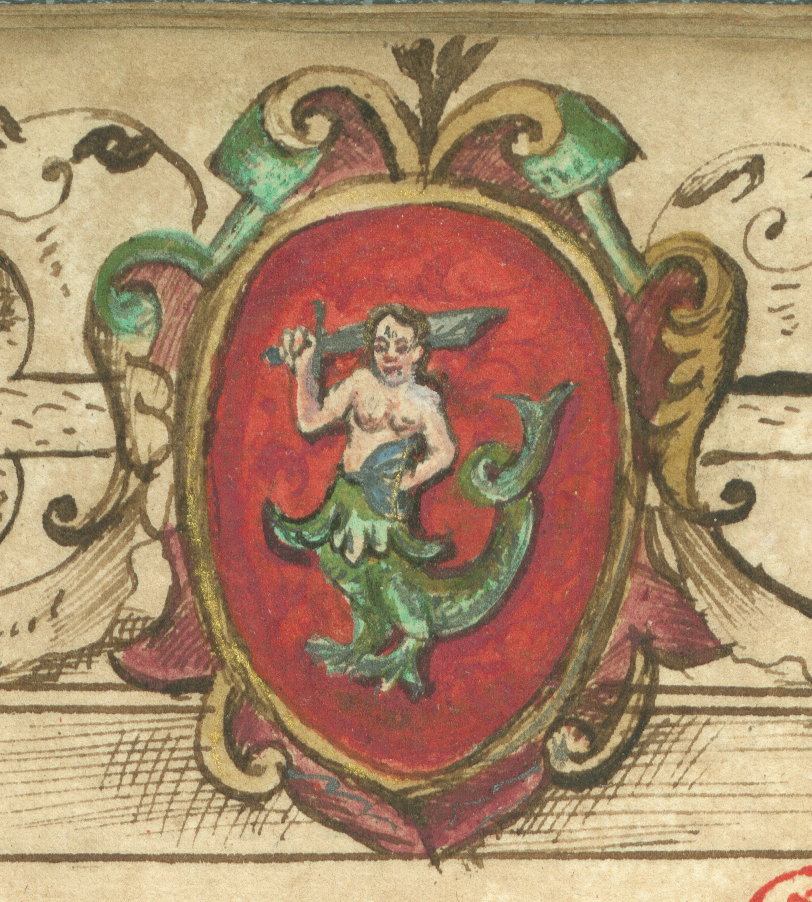
The coat of arms of Warsaw on the title page of a ledger of Old Warsaw in 1599

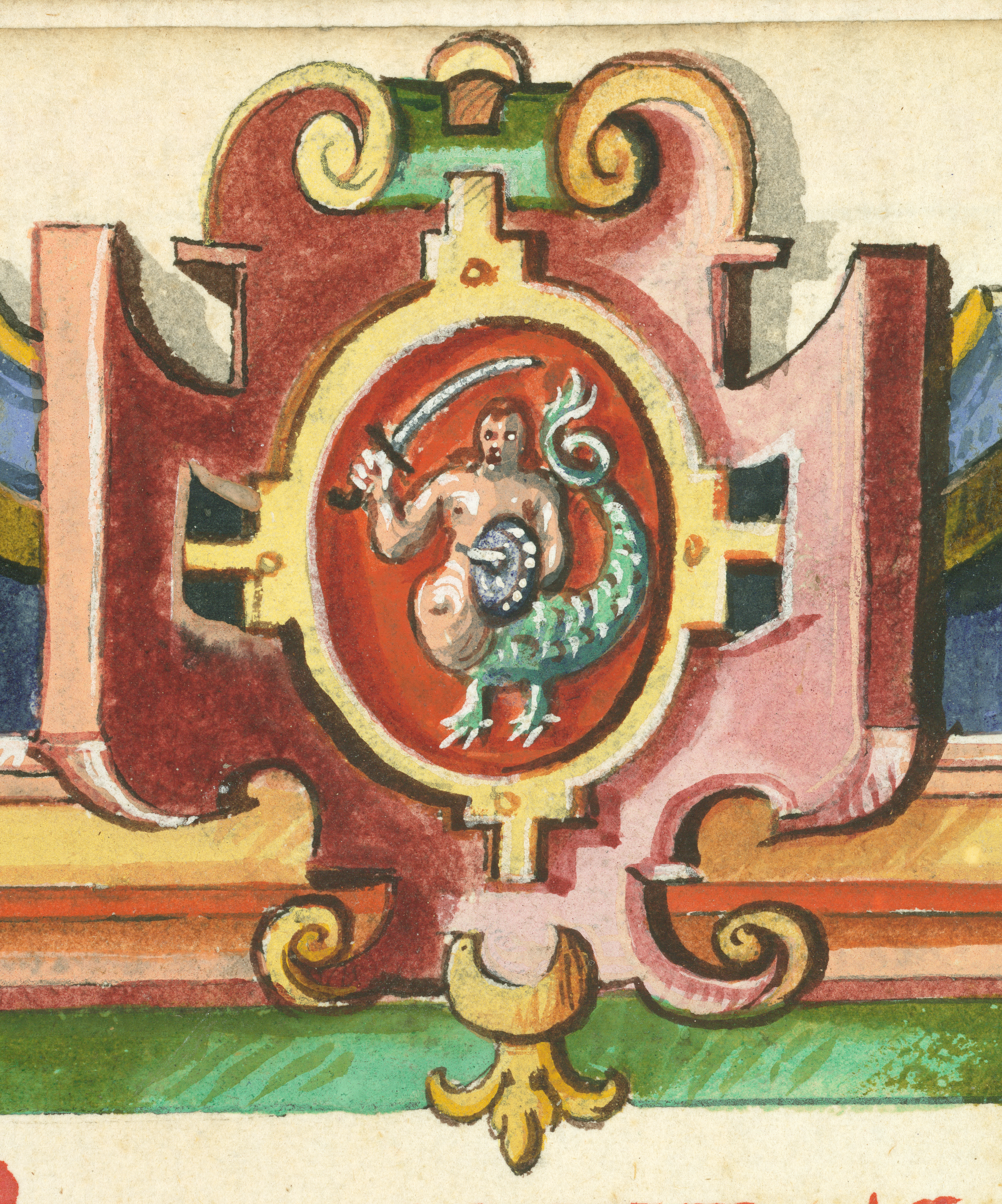
The coat of arms of Warsaw on the title page of a ledger of Old Warsaw in 1602

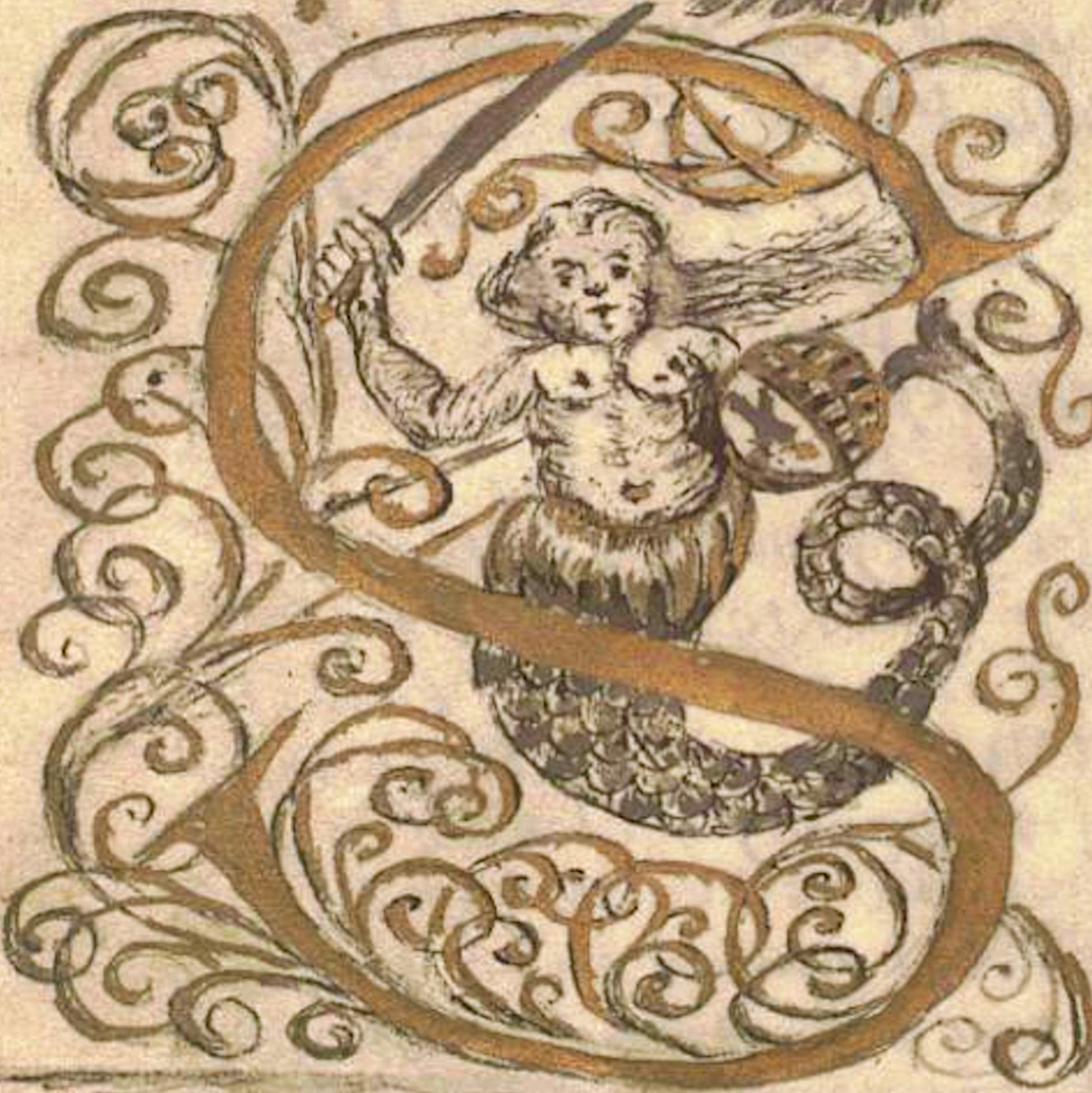
The coat of arms of Warsaw in 1720

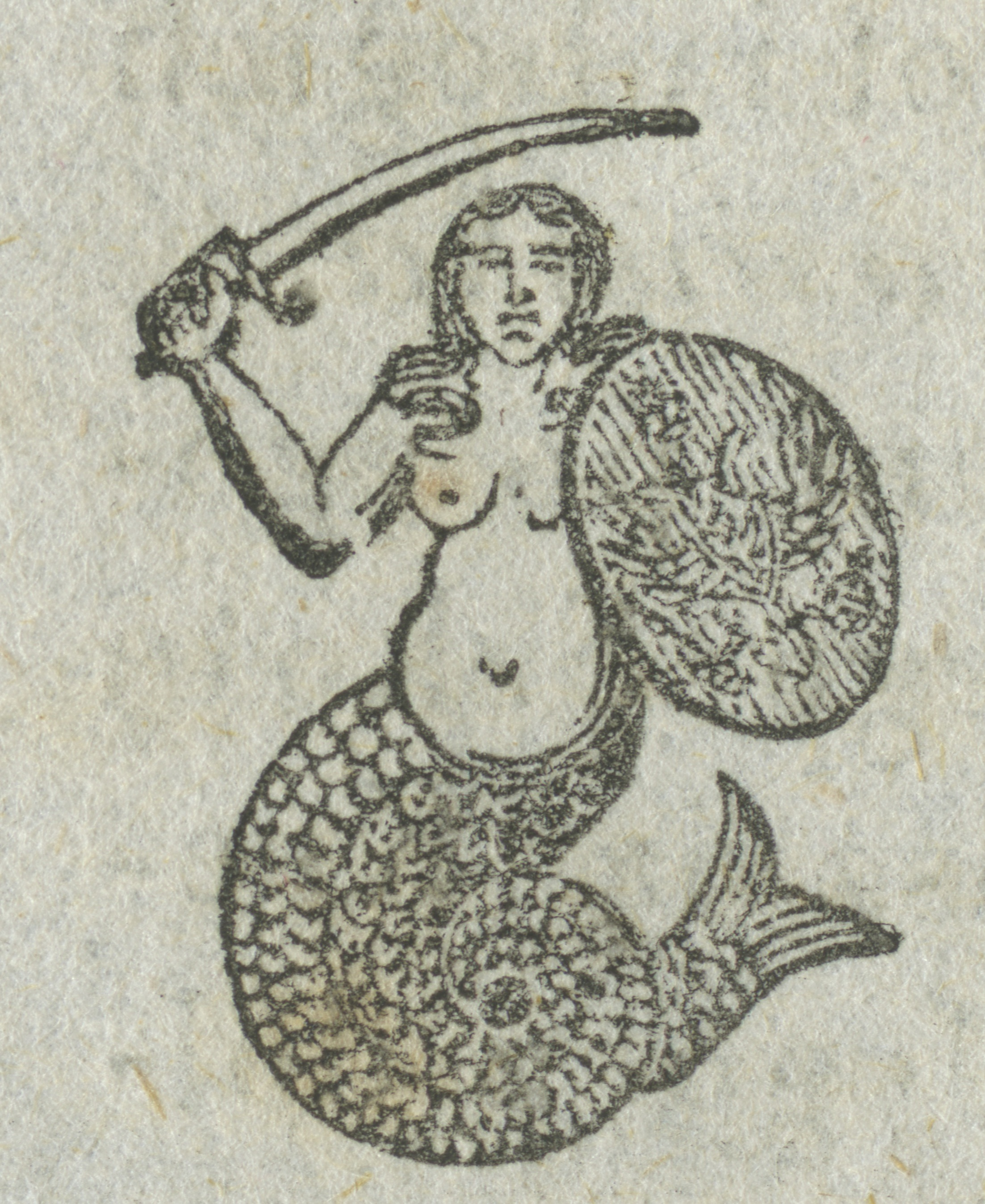
The coat of arms of Warsaw in 1845

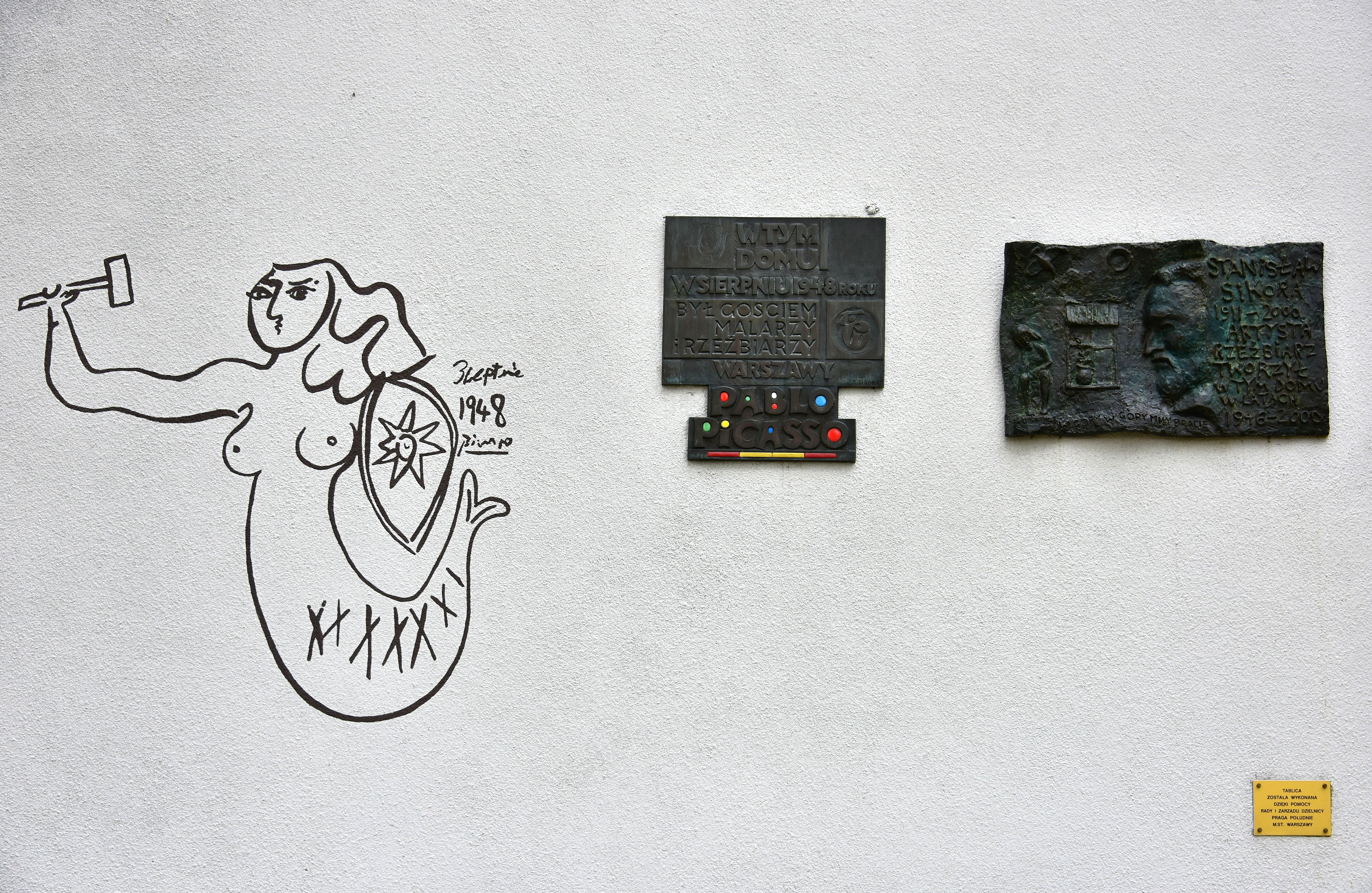
Mural by Pablo Picasso, Obrońców Street

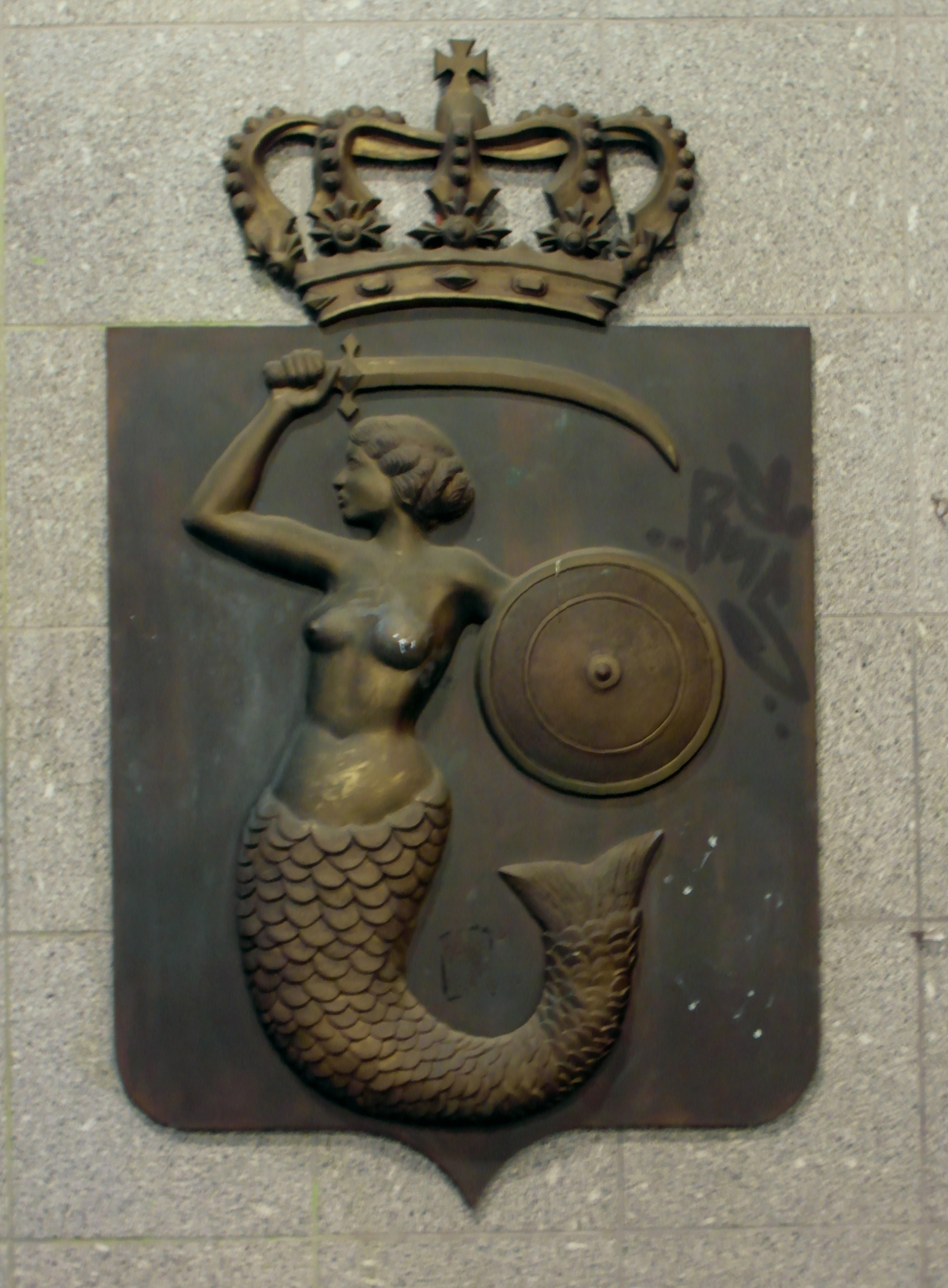
The coat of arms on display in Berlin, Germany, at the Warschauer Straße U-Bahn station

== See also ==
- The coat of arms of Warsaw
- The Little Mermaid, in Copenhagen
- Pania of the reef, in Napier
- The Warsaw Nike
- The Warsaw Unicorn
- Gold Duck
