= Mermaid Monument (Powiśle) =

Sculpture in Warsaw, Poland

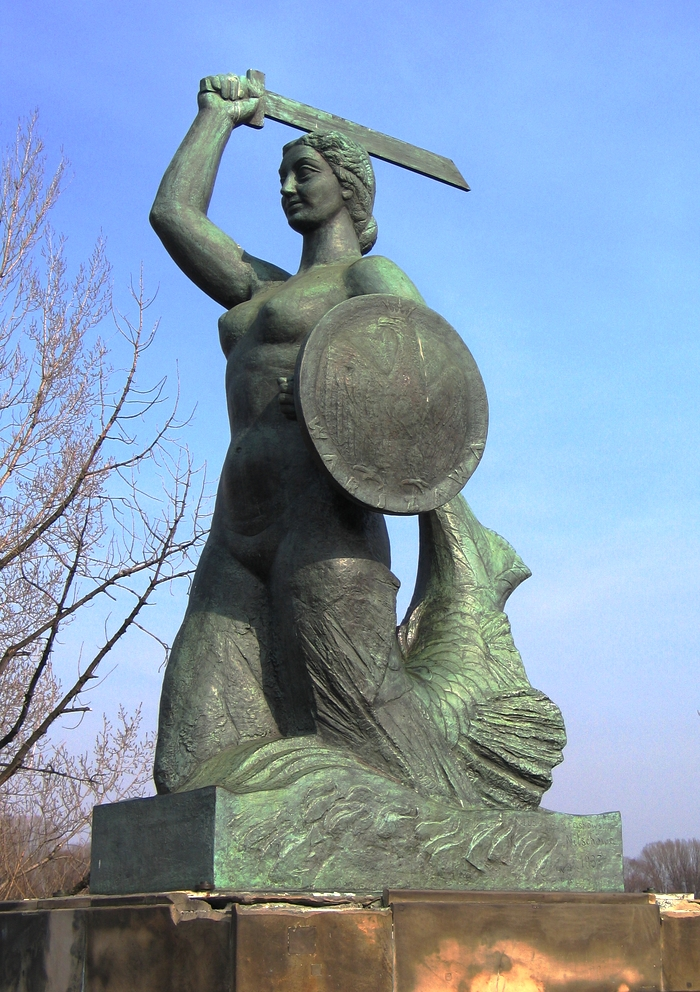
- The sculpture in 2005.
- Interactive map of Mermaid Monument
- Location: Wybrzeże Kościuszkowskie Street, Downtown, Warsaw, Poland
- Coordinates: 52°14′24″N 21°01′53″E
- Designer: Ludwika Nitschowa
- Type: Statue
- Material: Bronze (statue); sandstone (pedestal)
- Height: c. 6 m (total); 2.75 m (statue)
- Opening date: April 1939
- Dedicated to: Mermaid of Warsaw

The Mermaid Monument (Polish: Pomnik Syreny) is a bronze sculpture in Warsaw, Poland, placed at the intersection of Wybrzeże Kościuszkowskie and Tamka Streets, within the neighbourhood of Powiśle in the Downtown district. It was designed by Ludwika Nitschowa and unveiled in April 1939. The statue depicts the Mermaid of Warsaw, a symbol of the city, and its folklore patron.

== History ==
The monument was proposed by mayor Stefan Starzyński, and financed by the city. It was originally envisioned as a 20-metre-tall sculpture of a mermaid made from green glass, placed on a column in the middle of the Vistula river. However, the idea turned out to expensive and difficult to assemble. Instead it was decided to make a smaller traditional sculpture, that would be placed on the shore.

Ludwika Nitschowa was commitioned for its realisation. For this, the city lend hear a room in the Warsaw Water Filters complex at 81 Koszykowa Street, together with its two employees as her aids. Works on the sculpture lasted, several months, beginning either in late 1936 or early 1937.

Krystyna Krahelska, a student of the University of Warsaw, posed as a model for body and head. However, Nitschowa did not use her face, and identity of the model remained largely unknown until it was revealed to the press by the author aftet the Second World War. She was a cousin of Nitschowa's close friend, Wanda Krahelska-Filipowicz.

A model of the sculpture was presented in May 1937, at the 1st All-Poland Sculpture Salon at the Art Propaganda Institute in Warsaw. It was the largest object at the exhibition.

In 1938, the sculpture was cast in bronze at the Bracia Łopieńscy workshop at 55 Hoża Street in Warsaw. Due to its size, it was made in four parts, which were later assembled together with screws, and covered in patina.

The monument was installed near the river, at Wybrzeże Kościuszkowskie Street, in the early April 1939, without an opening ceremony, and with minimal coverage by the press. It was placed on a sandstone pedestal within a fountain basin, designed by Stanisław Pomian-Połujan. The plans for decorating its surroundings were halted due to the outbreak of the Second World War. This would have included several small sculptures of gulls, getting ready for a flight, placed around it, which were destroyed during the conflict. There were also plans for erecting an observation deck by the river, to allow for viewing the sculpture from the coast.

The monument itself survived the war with minimal damages. In 1949, employees of the Bracia Łopieńscy workshop patched 35 small bullet holes in the sculpture. It was renovated in 1966, which included reactivation of the fountain.

In 1985, a provisional bridge at the intersection of Wybrzeże Kościuszkowskie and Tamka Streets was opened, which, due to the location near the sculpture, became known as the Mermaid Bridge. In 2000, it was replaced next to the Holy Cross Bridge.

In 2006, next to the monument was unveiled a plaque, commemorating the city receiving the Commander's Cross of the Order of Virtuti Militari.

== Design ==
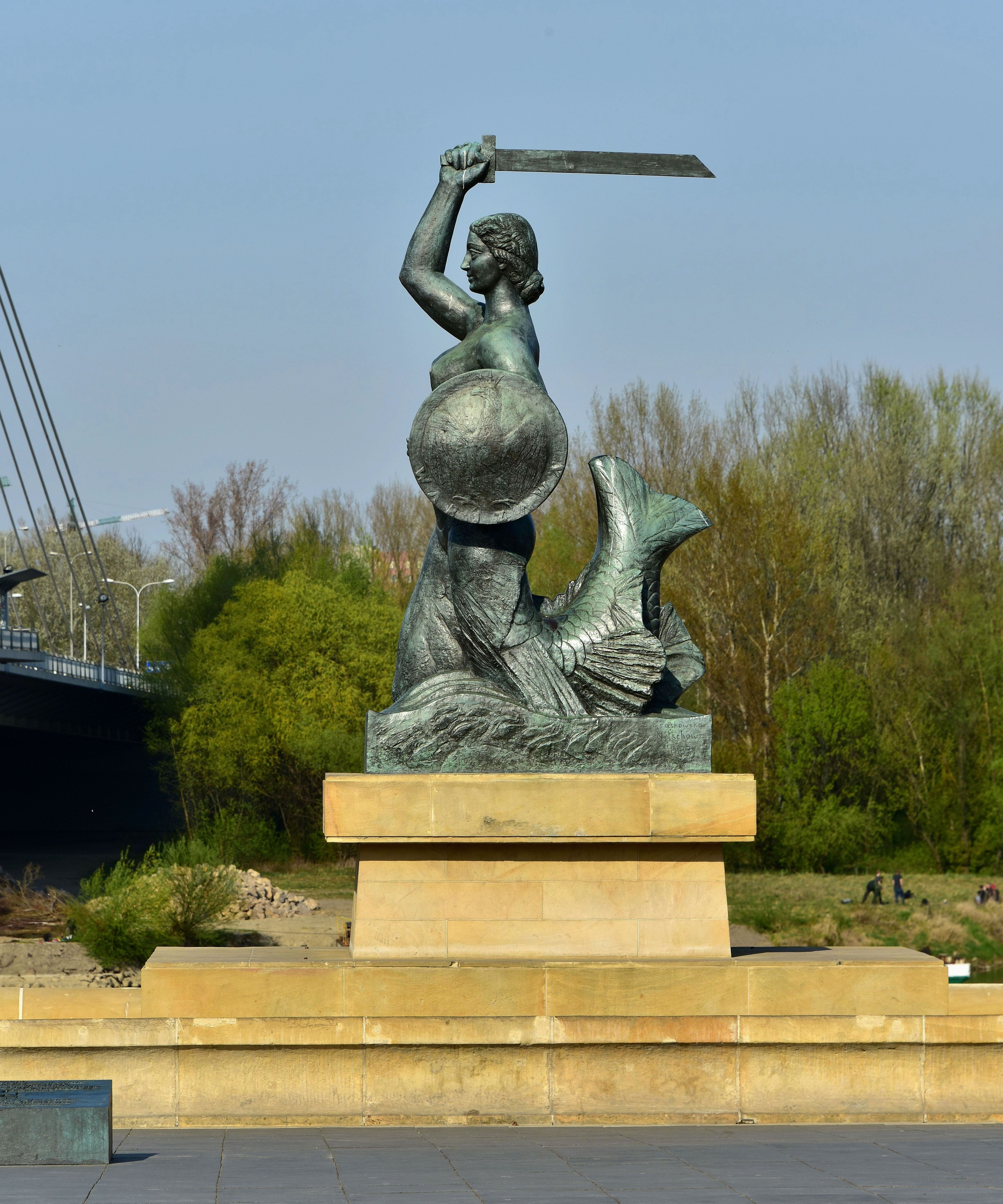
The sculpture from the side.

The monument includes a bronze statue of a nude mermaid facing north, with a sword raised above her right hand, and a circular shield in her left, with an image of an eagle with a crown on its head, and inscription which reads "Warszawa" (Warsaw). Her hair are tied into a bun at the height of her neck. It is installed on a sandstone pedestal, made from three blocks, placed within a fountain bassin. The statue has height of 2.75 m, while the entire monument measures approximately 6 m.

== See also ==
- Mermaid Monument (Old Town, Warsaw), another sculpture in the city dedicated to the Mermaid of Warsaw
