= Mermaid Monument (Old Town, Warsaw) =

Sculpture in Warsaw, Poland

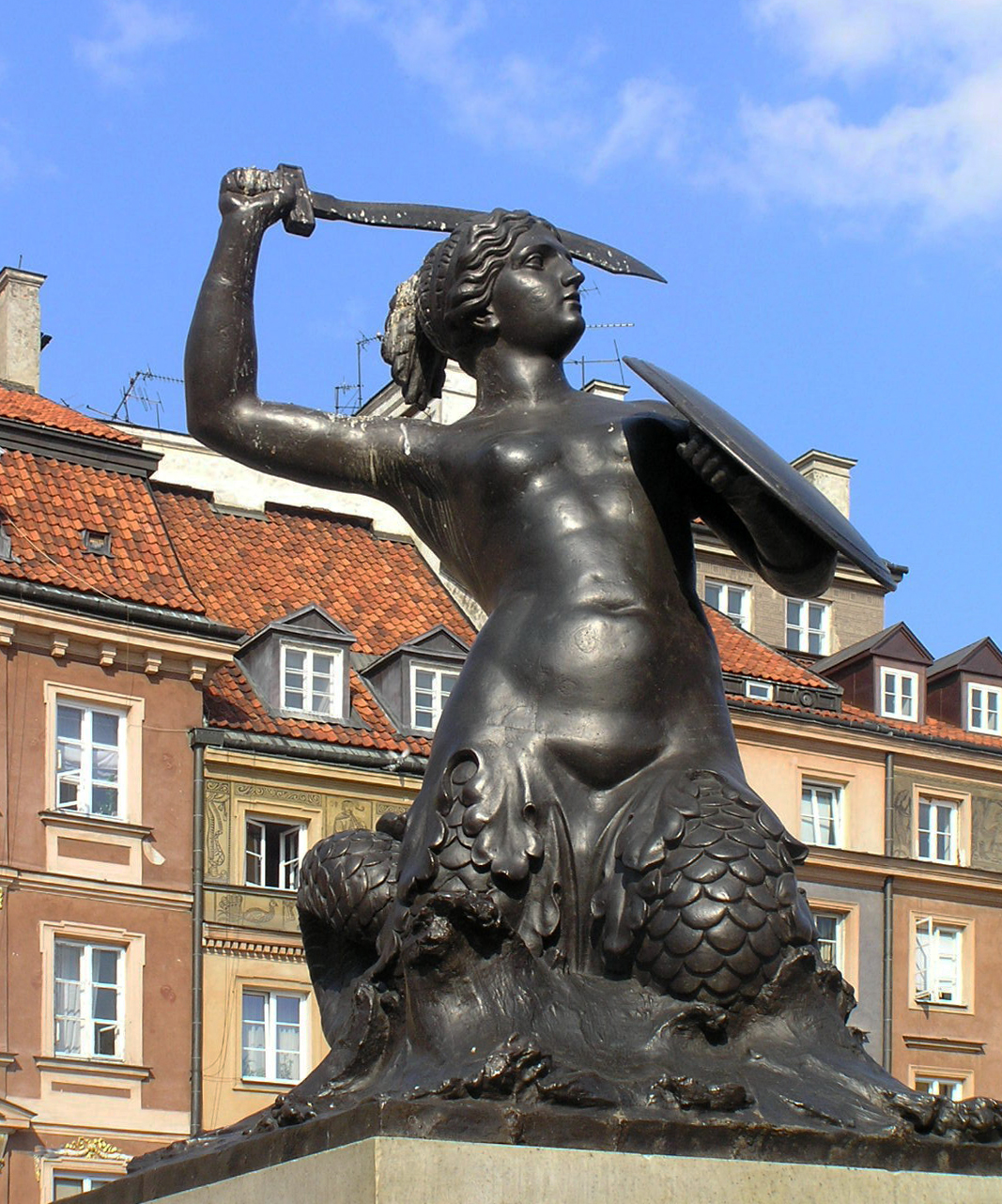
- The sculpture in 2005.
- Interactive map of Mermaid Monument
- Location: Old Town Market Place, Downtown, Warsaw, Poland
- Coordinates: 52°14′59″N 21°00′44″E
- Designer: Konstanty Hegel
- Type: Statue
- Material: Zinc
- Length: 120 cm (47 in)
- Width: 119 cm (47 in)
- Height: 180 cm (71 in)
- Opening date: 1855
- Dedicated to: Mermaid of Warsaw

The Mermaid Monument (Polish: Pomnik Syreny) is a zinc sculpture placed at the Old Town Market Place in Warsaw, Poland. The contemporary sculpture is a 2008 replica, with the original, designed by Konstanty Hegel and unveiled in 1855, currently being held in the nearby Museum of Warsaw. The work depicts the Mermaid of Warsaw, a symbol of the city, and its folklore patron. She is shown as a melusine emerging out of turbulent waters, with a spiral tail, and holding a sword in her right hand high above her head, and a shield in her left hand, near her chest.

== History ==
The sculpture was designed by Konstanty Hegel, and manufactured in Karol Juliusz Minter's workshop. By 7 August 1855 it was placed in the centre of the Old Town Marek Place. It became part of a fountain built as part of a newly-opened city water supply system, placed on an artificial rock formation, in the middle of a basin.

Made from zinc, the sculpture depicts the Mermaid of Warsaw, a symbol of the city, and its folklore patron. She is shown as a melusine emerging out of turbulent waters, with a spiral tail, and holding a sword in her right hand high above her head, and a shield in her left hand, near her chest. The design of the sculptures was met with criticism. The sculpture is credited with further popularising the mermaid as the city symbol, and influencing later designs of its coat of arms.

In 1913, following the closure of the market place, the fountain was renovated and given a form of an octagonal fountain basin with 26 stone polls around it, connected with iron chains, with the statue placed on a sandstone pedestal. It was removed in 1928, and the sculpture was placed in a warehouse. A year later, it was moved to the Syrena Warsaw rowing sports club centre at 8 Solec Street. It was placed on a sandstone pedestal, sourced from the deconstructed St. Alexander Nevsky Cathedral.

The monument survived the Second World War, however it was greatly damaged during the Warsaw Uprising. It was restored after the war, in the Bracia Łopieńscy workshops. It included attaching new sword, left arm and shield, and patching over 50 bullet holes. To reinforce its zinc structure, the sculpture was covered in posphor bronze.

In 1951, the statue was placed in the Marshal Edward Rydz-Śmigły Park near Solec Street. In January 1969, it was vandalised with its surface being damaged and the sword ripped off. In July 1972, it was renovated and placed at escarpment of the former Marshal Tower, within the northern interior corner of the city walls. There, it was vandalised several more times. It was restored again between 1985 and 1986, and covered in a layer of bronze. It was removed from there in 1994.

Following the renovations, it was unveiled at its original location at the Old Town Market Place, on 12 December 1999. It was placed on a new pedestal, designed by Anna Jarnuszkiewicz, Krystian Jarnuszkiewicz, Jan Mazur, and Maria Mazur.

In May 2008, the sculpture was replaced with a replica, while the original was moved to the Museum of Warsaw.

== Characteristics ==
The sculpture is made from zinc and depicts the Mermaid of Warsaw, a symbol of the city, and its folklore patron. She is shown as a nude melusine emerging out of turbulent waters, with a spiral tail, and holding a sword in her right hand high above her head, and a shield in her left hand, near her chest. It is 180 cm tall, 119 cm wide, and 120 cm long. The sculpture is placed on a pedestal, in the centre of the Old Town Market Place. It is a 2008 replica, with the original dating to 1855 being in a collection of the Museum of Warsaw.

== Gallery ==
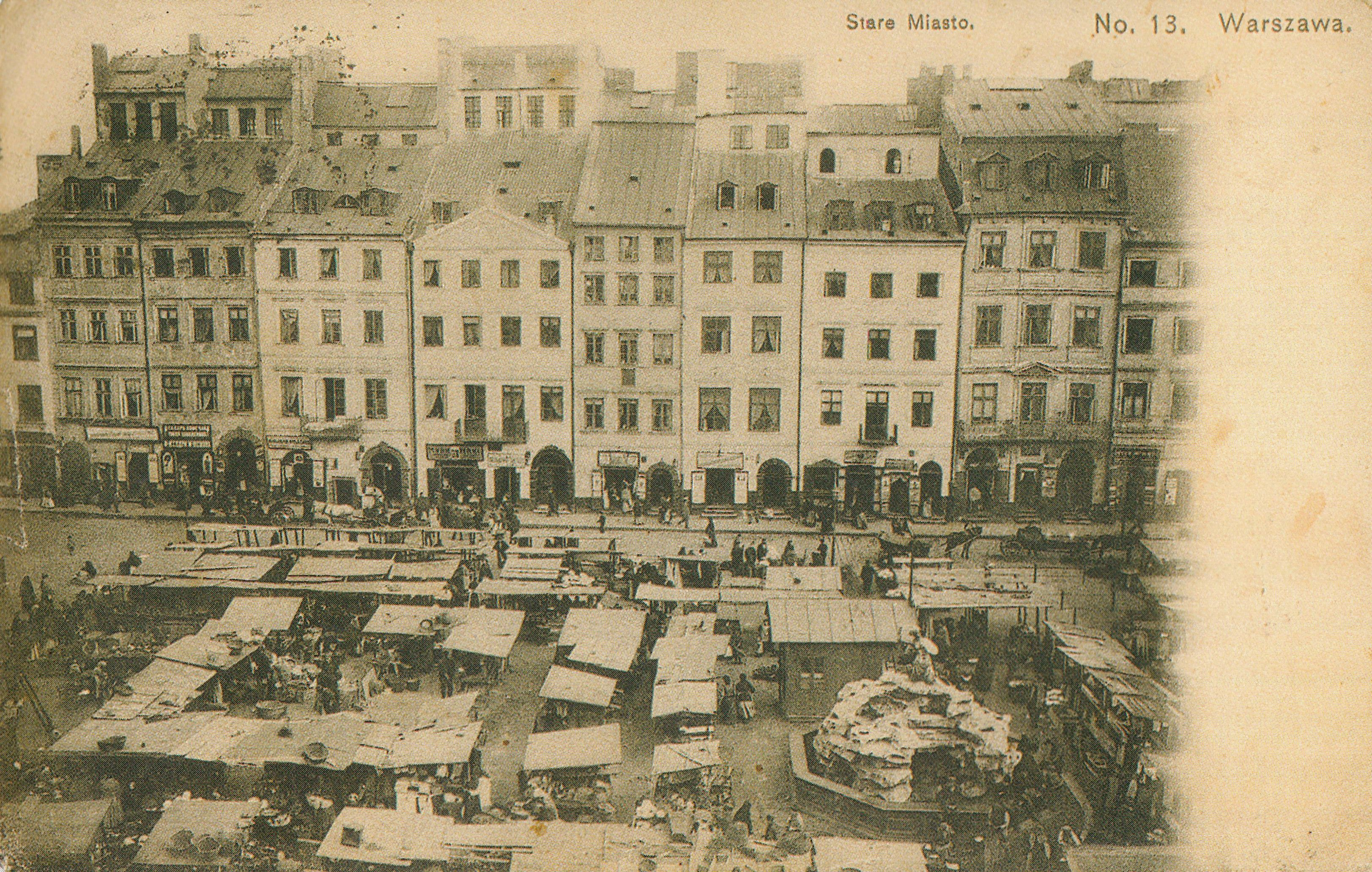
The Old Town Market Place, including the Mermaid Monument, in 1908.

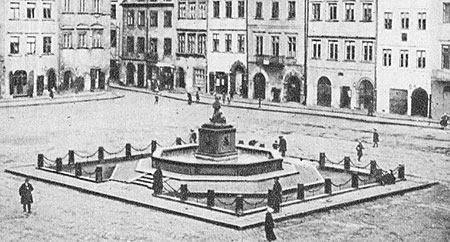
The Mermaid Monument at the Old Town Market Place in around 1920.

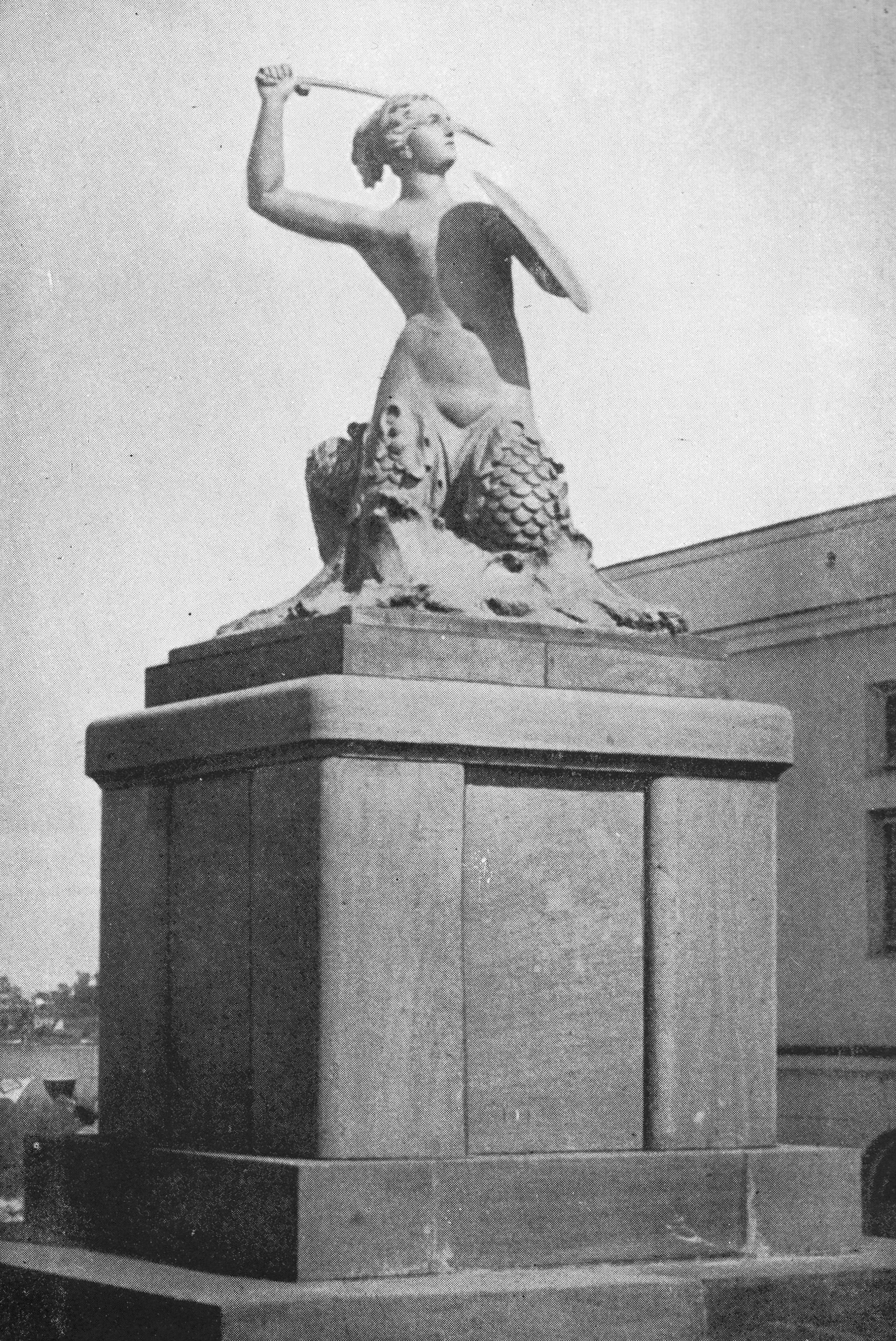
The statue at the Syrena Warsaw sports club centre in the 1930s.

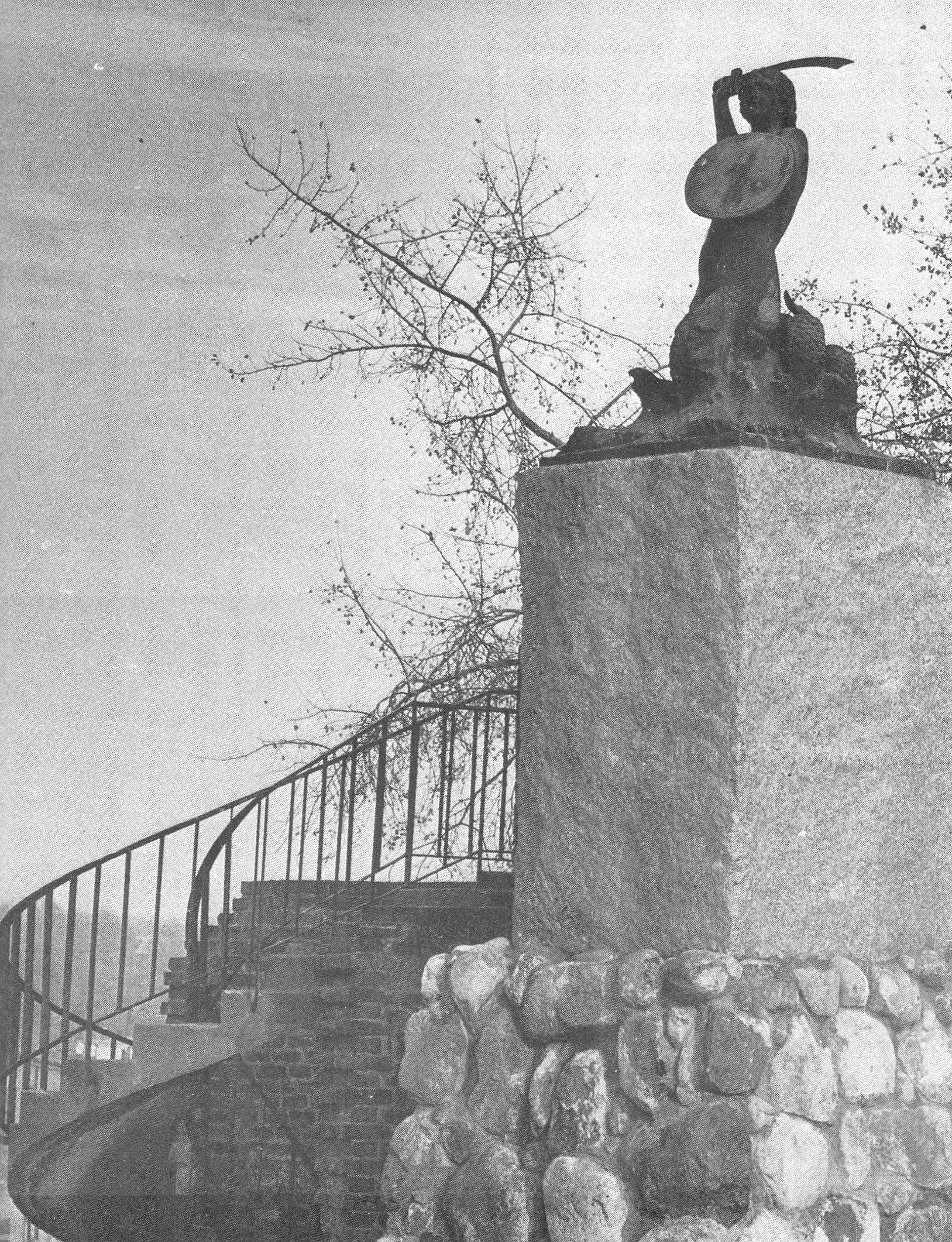
The statue next to the city walls in the 1970s.

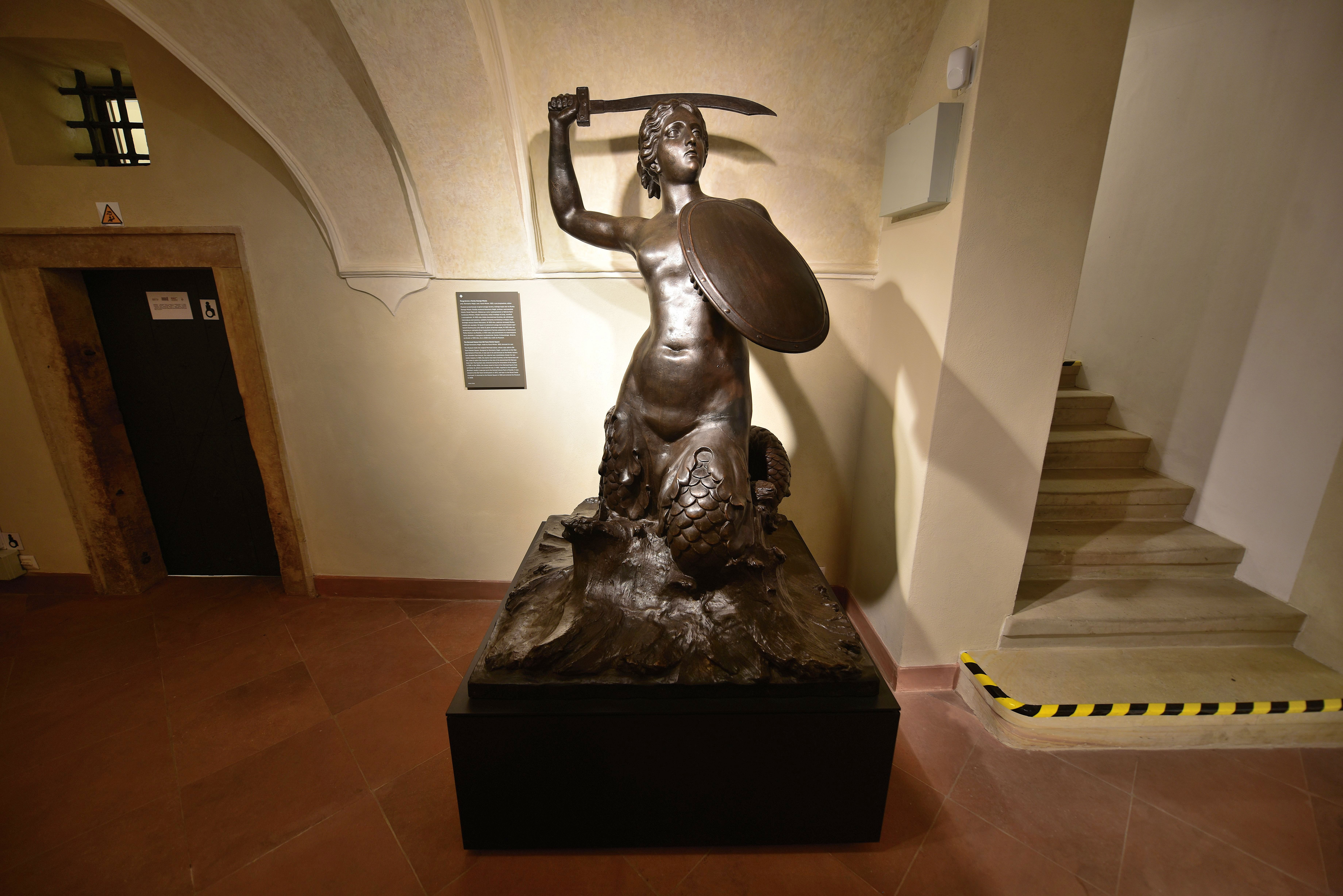
The original statue in the Museum of Warsaw in 2018.

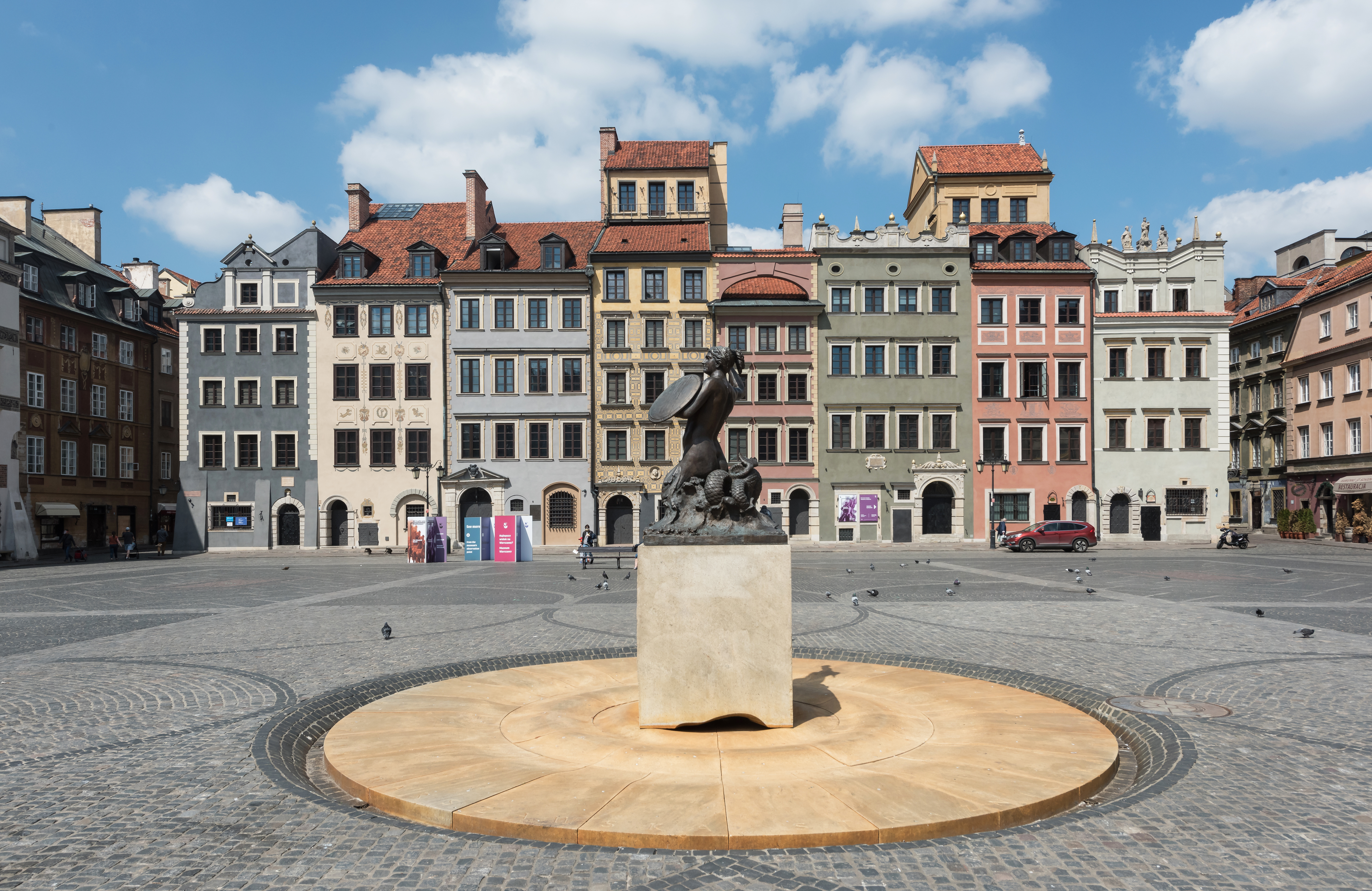
The replica of the statue in 2020.

== See also ==
- Mermaid Monument (Powiśle), another sculpture in the city dedicated to the Mermaid of Warsaw
