= Old Town Market Square =

Square in Warsaw, Poland

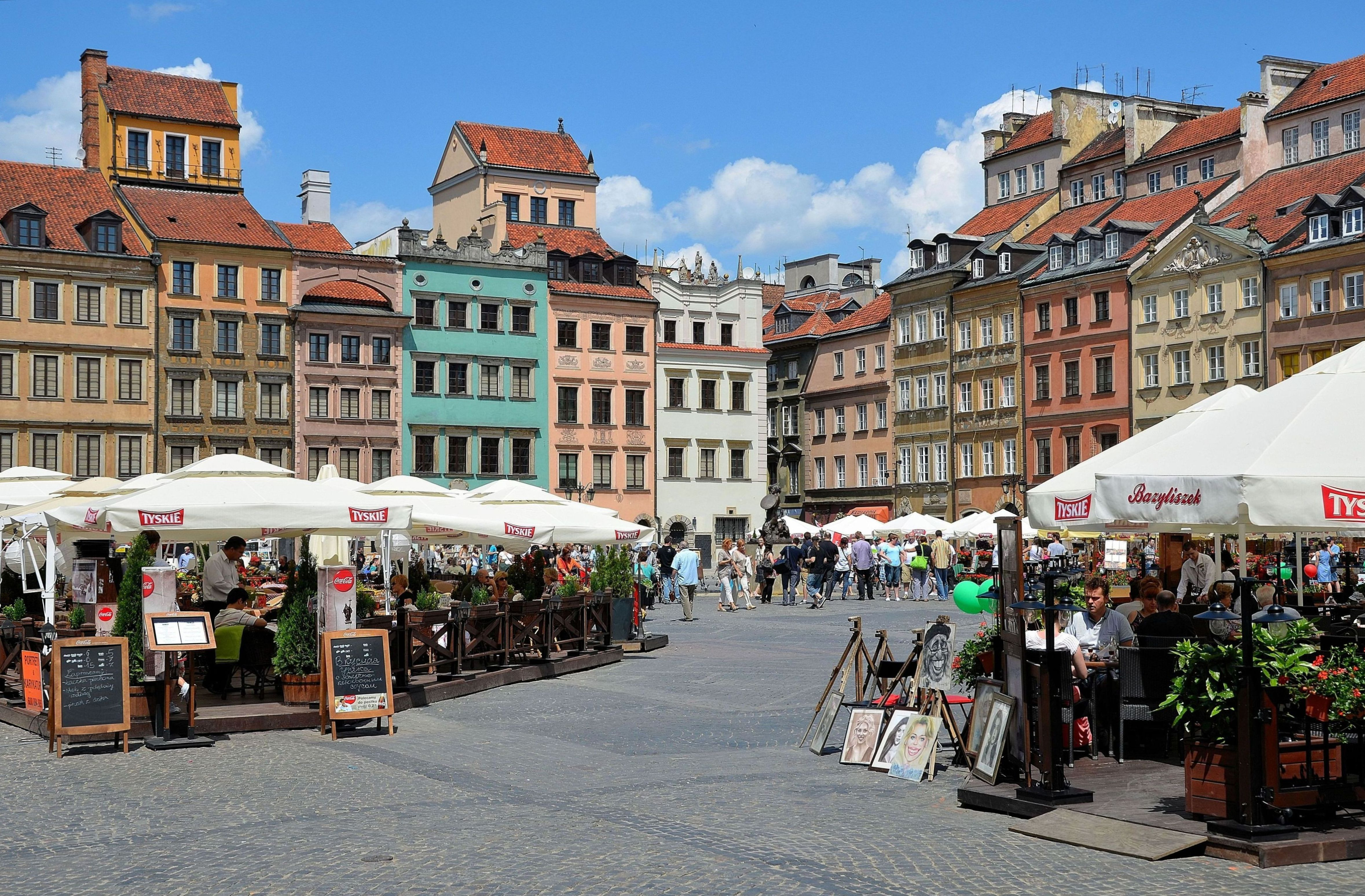
- Warsaw's Old Town Market Place
- Interactive map of Old Town Market Square
- Native name: Rynek Starego Miasta
- Type: Square
- Maintained by: Warsaw City Council
- Location: Śródmieście, Warsaw, Poland
- North: Krzywe Kolo Street
- East: Celna Street, Jezuicka Street
- South: Zapiecek Street, Świętojańska Street
- West: Nowomiejska Street, Wąski Dunaj Street

UNESCO World Heritage Site
- Type: Cultural
- Criteria: ii, vi
- Designated: 1980
- Part of: Historic Centre of Warsaw
- Reference no.: 30bis

Historic Monument of Poland
- Designated: 1994-09-08
- Part of: Warsaw – historic city center with the Royal Route and Wilanów
- Reference no.: M.P. 1994 nr 50 poz. 423

Old Town Market Square (Polish: Rynek Starego Miasta, pronounced [ˈrɘ.nɛk staˈrɛ.ɡɔ ˈmjas.ta]) is the center and oldest part of the Old Town of Warsaw, Poland. Immediately after the Warsaw Uprising, it was systematically blown up by the Wehrmacht. After World War II, the Old Town Market Place was restored to its prewar appearance.

== History ==
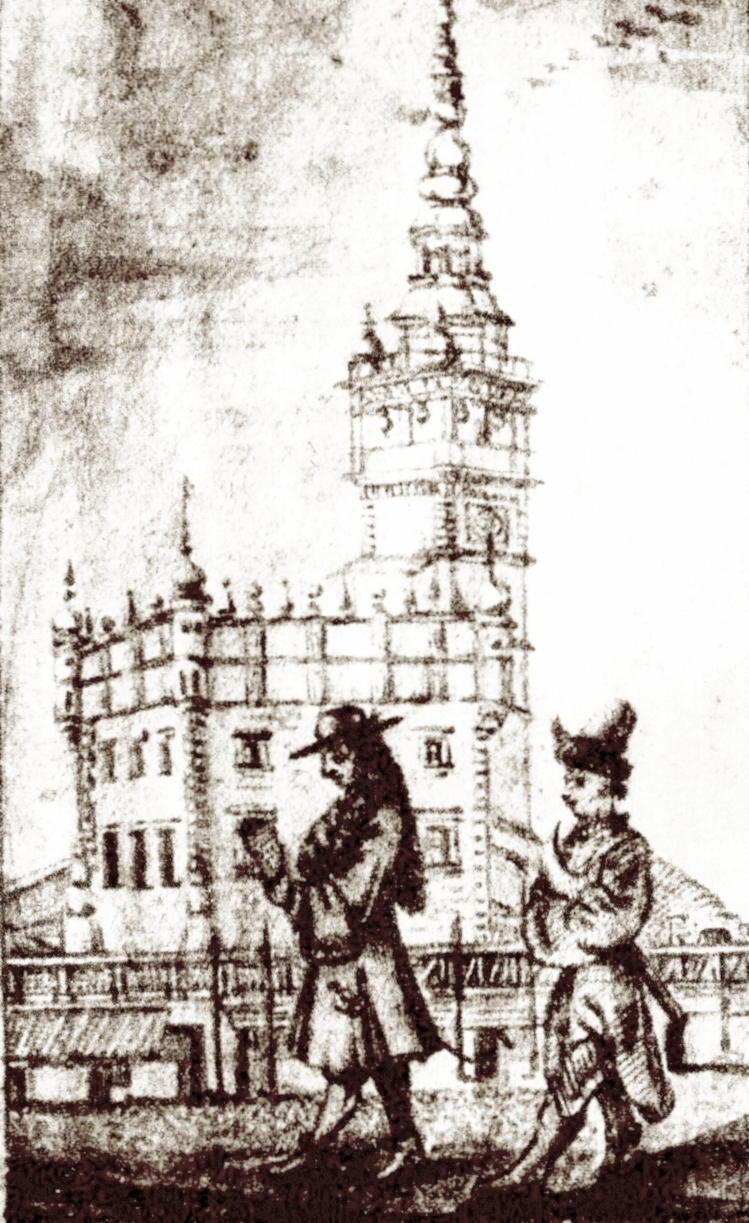
The town hall in 1701

The Old Town Market Place is the true heart of the Old Town, and until the end of the 18th century it was the heart of all of Warsaw. It originated in the late 13th century, at the same time that the city was founded. Here the representatives of guilds and merchants met in the town hall (built before 1429, pulled down in 1817), and fairs and the occasional execution were held. The houses around it represented the Gothic style until the great fire of 1607, after which they were rebuilt in late-Renaissance style and eventually in late-Baroque style by Tylman Gamerski in 1701.

The main feature at that time was the immense town hall, reconstructed in 1580 in the style of Polish mannerism by Antoneo de Ralia and again between 1620 and 1621. The architecture of the building was similar to many other structures of that type in Poland (e.g. the town hall in Szydłowiec). It was adorned with attics and four side towers. A clock tower, embellished with an arcade loggia, was covered with a bulbous spire typical for Warsaw mannerist architecture (an example being the Royal Castle).

The district was damaged by the bombs of the German Luftwaffe during the Invasion of Poland (1939). The ancient Market Place was rebuilt in the 1950s, after having been destroyed by the German Army after the suppression of the 1944 Warsaw Uprising. Today it is a major tourist attraction.

== Features ==
The current buildings were reconstructed between 1948 and 1953, to look as they did in the 17th century when the square was mostly inhabited by rich merchant families. The Warsaw Mermaid, a bronze sculpture by Konstanty Hegel, has stood as the symbol of Warsaw since 1855.

Names of 18th-century Polish parliamentarians are used for the four sides of this vast (90 by 73 m or 295 by 240 ft) square:

- Dekert's Side (Strona Dekerta), the north side (numbers, 28–42), named after Jan Dekert, which houses the Warsaw Historical Museum. The entrance is in a building called "The Negro" (Pod Murzynkiem, nr 36), after the traditional sign over the doorway.
- Barss' Side (Strona Barssa), the east side (numbers, 2–26), with the Adam Mickiewicz Museum honoring the 19th-century Polish poet.
- Kołłątaj's Side (Strona Hugo Kołłątaja), the west side (numbers, 15–31).
- Zakrzewski's Side (Strona Zakrzewskiego), the south side (numbers, 1–13).

Wario Wojciech, the so-called keeper of the square, can often be seen walking around in his traditional dress, consisting of a red suit and a curved sword.

== Gallery ==
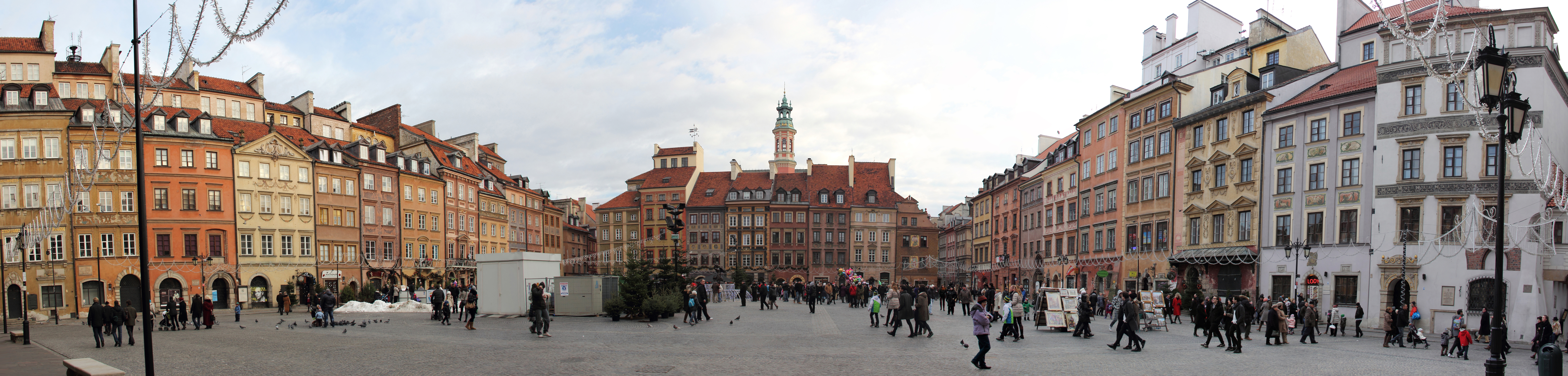
Warsaw Old Town Market Square Panorama

=== Historical images ===
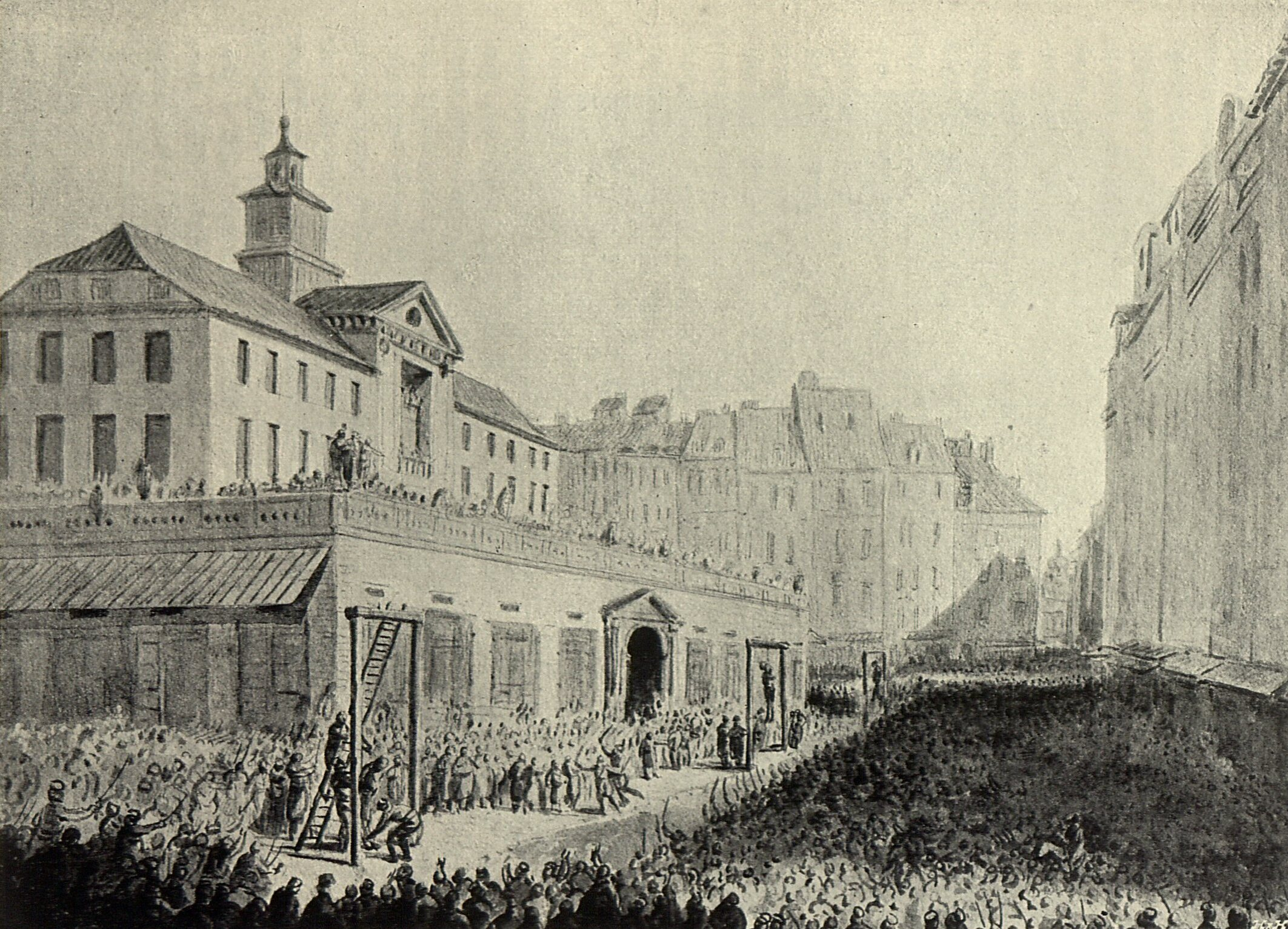
Old Town Market Place in 1794

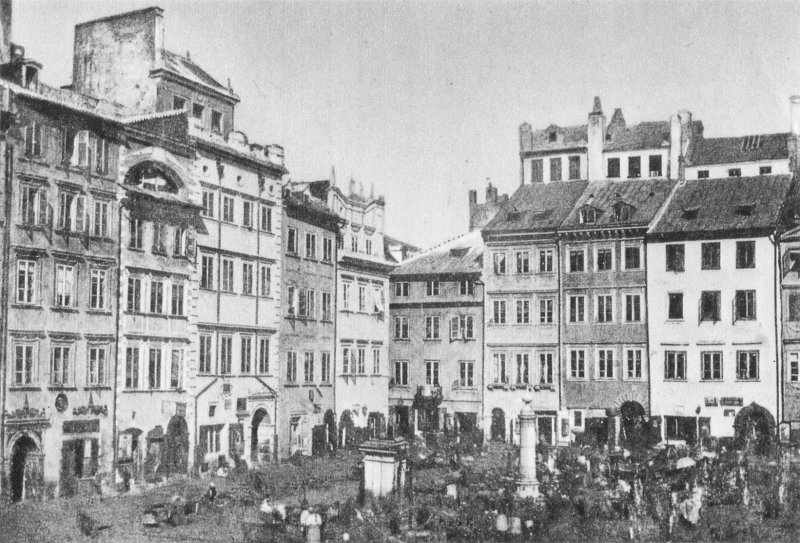
The Square in the 1860s

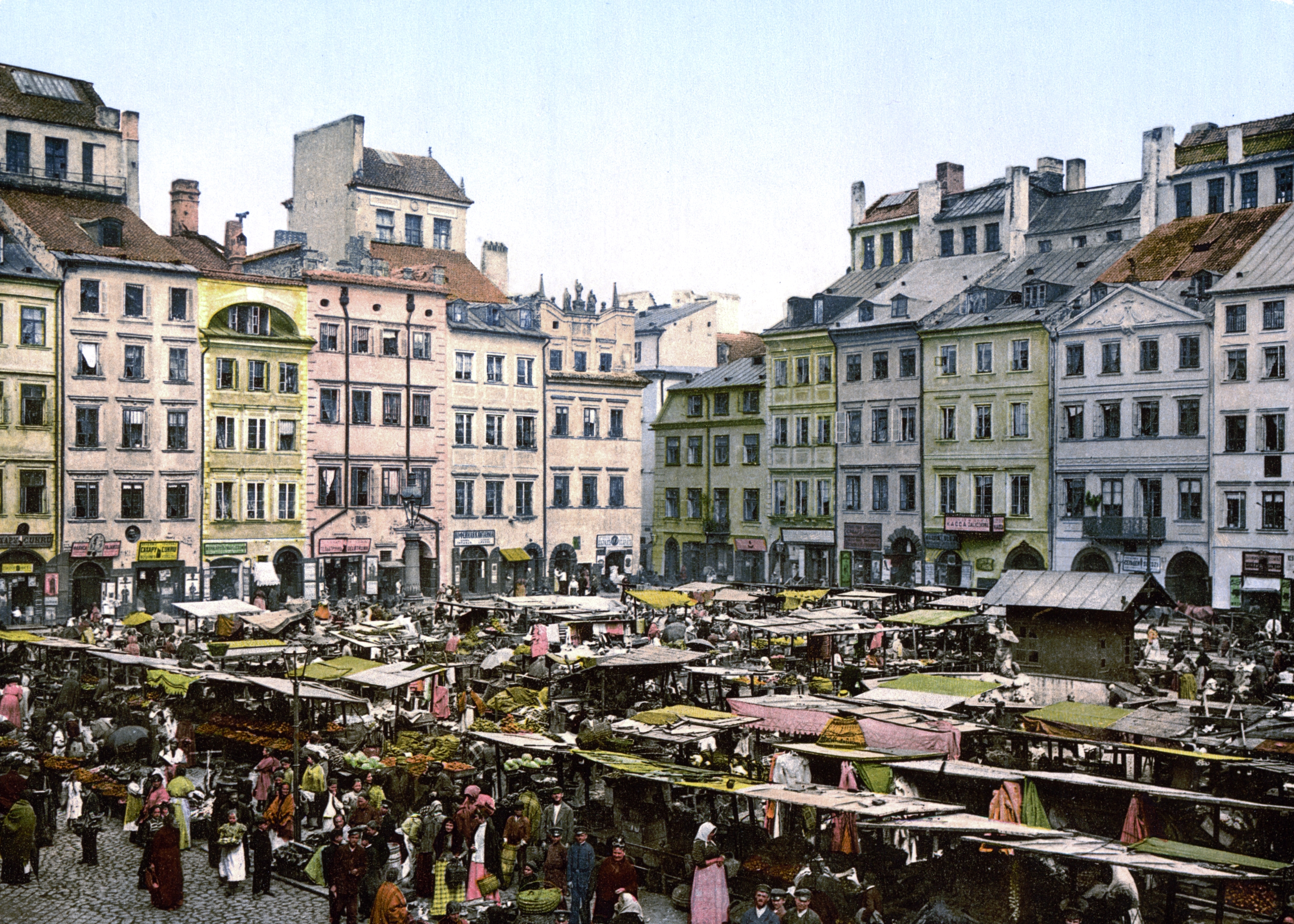
Between 1890 and 1905

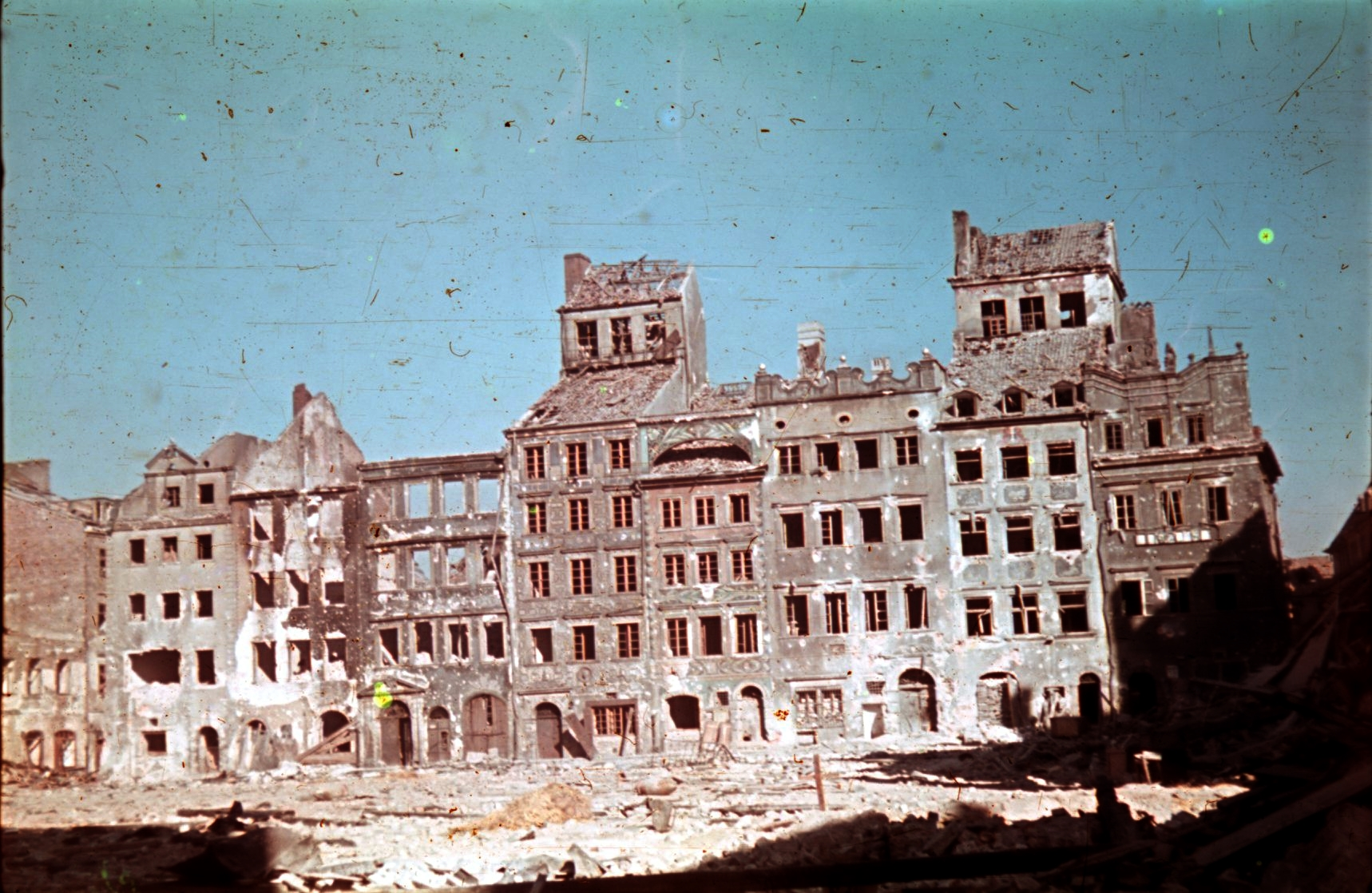
Old Town Market Place in 1944 during the Warsaw Uprising

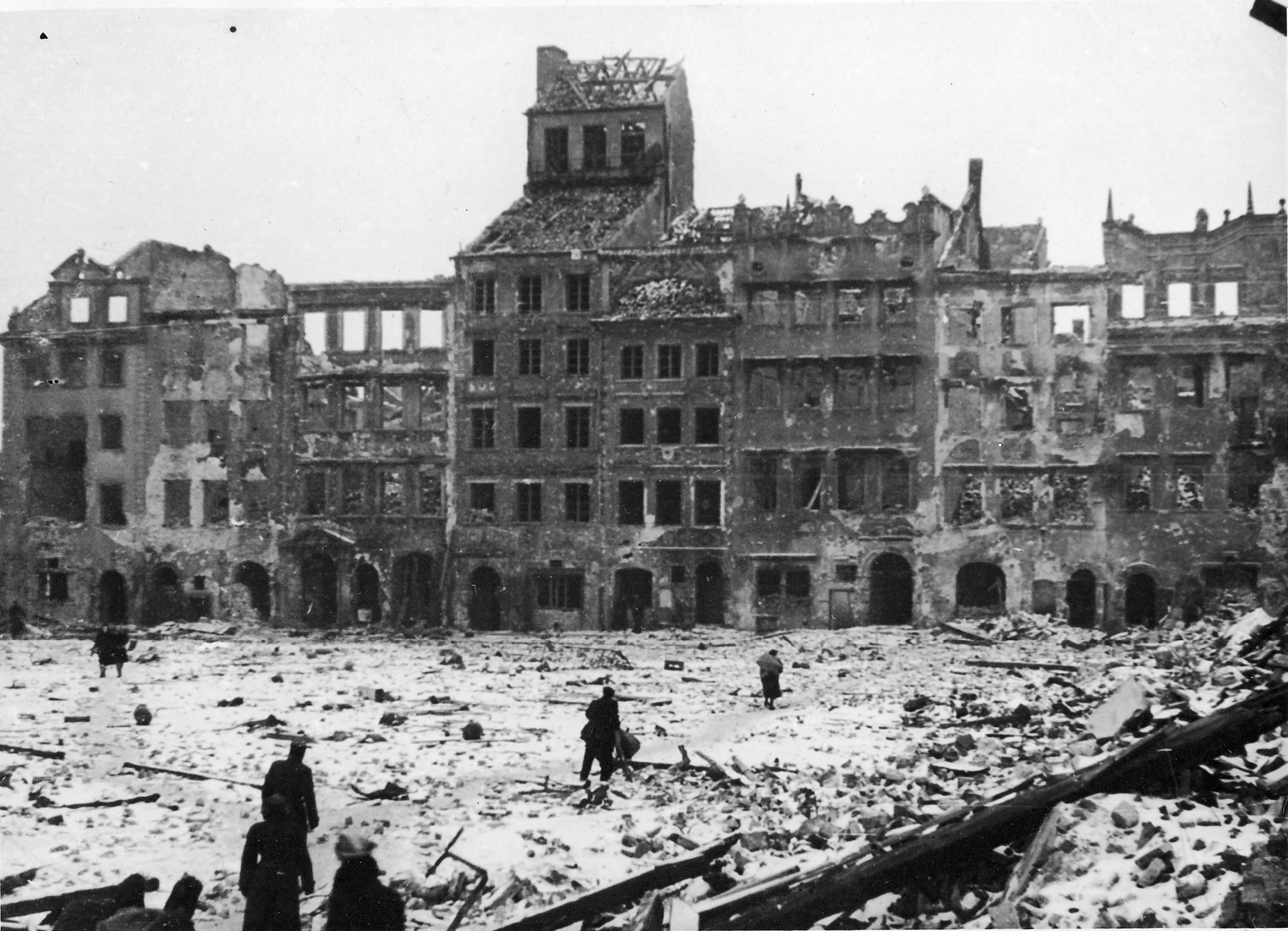
Shortly after the war

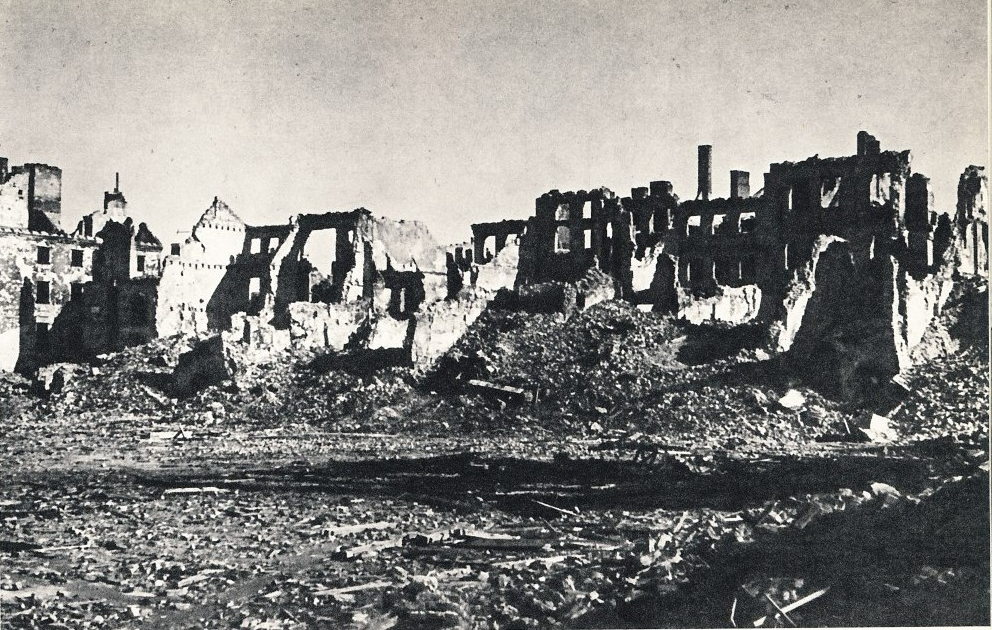
Warsaw Old Town Market Place, Barrs Side, photograph of 1945

=== Sides ===
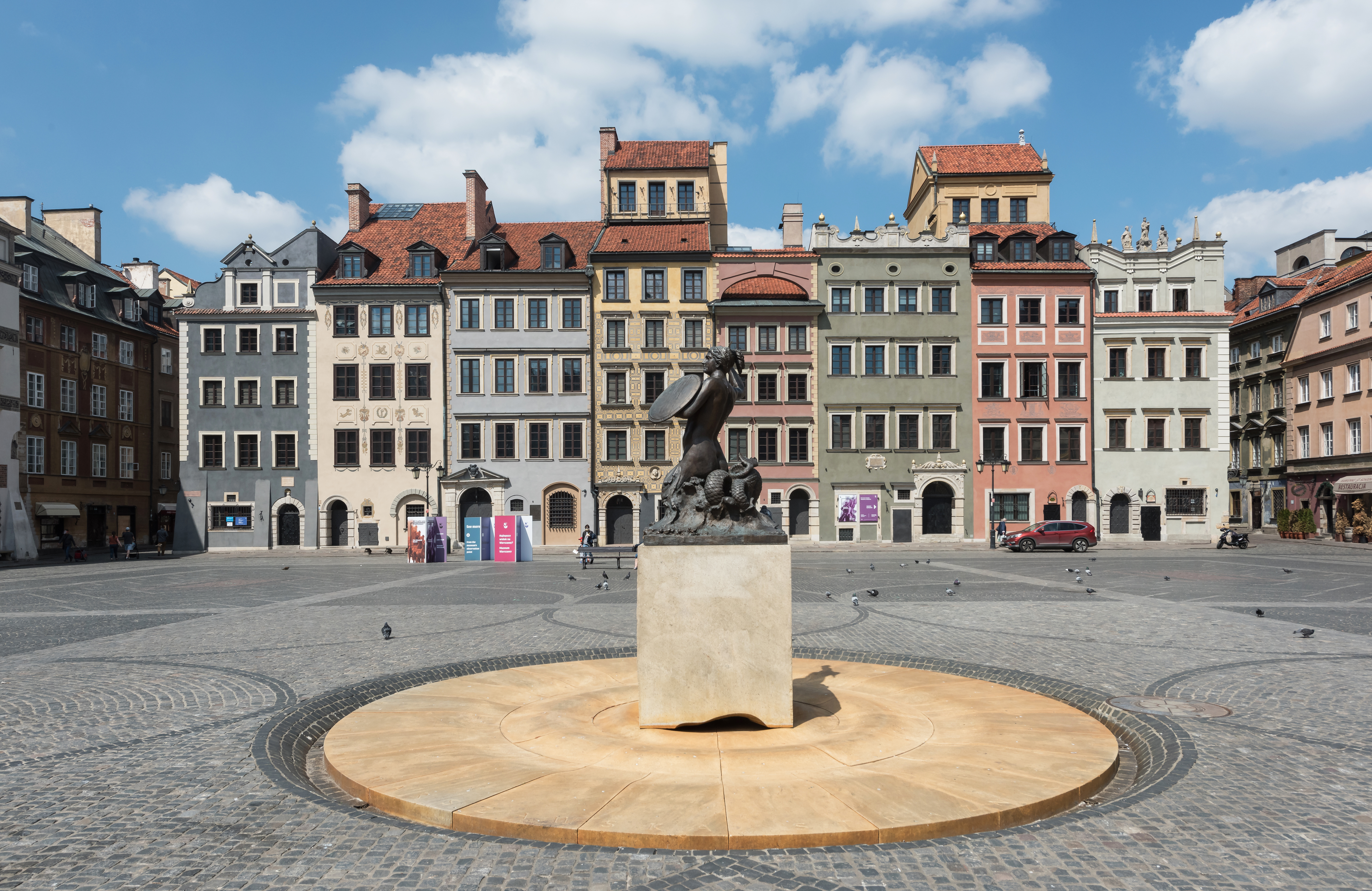
Dekert's Side

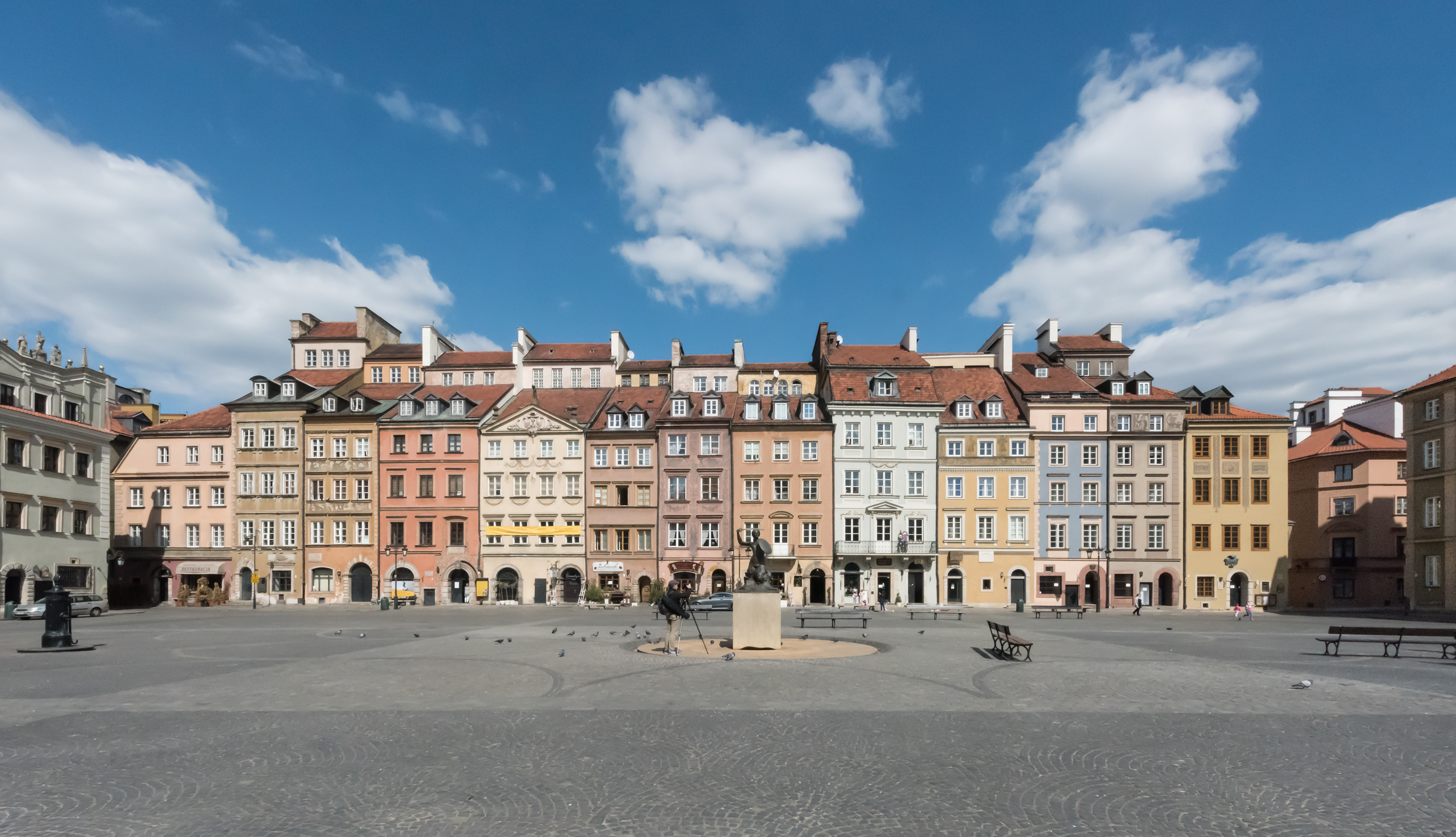
Barss Side

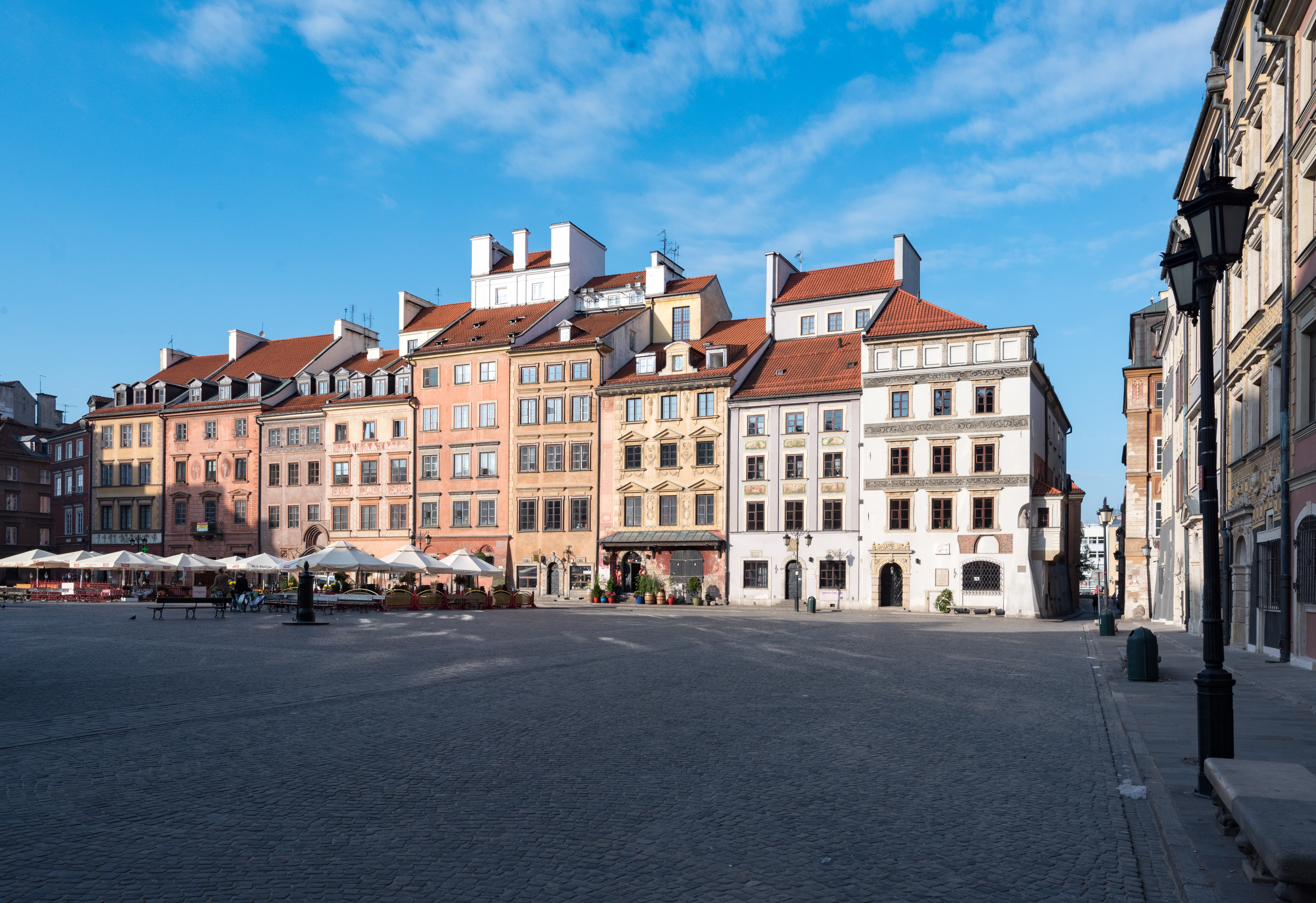
Kołłątaj's Side

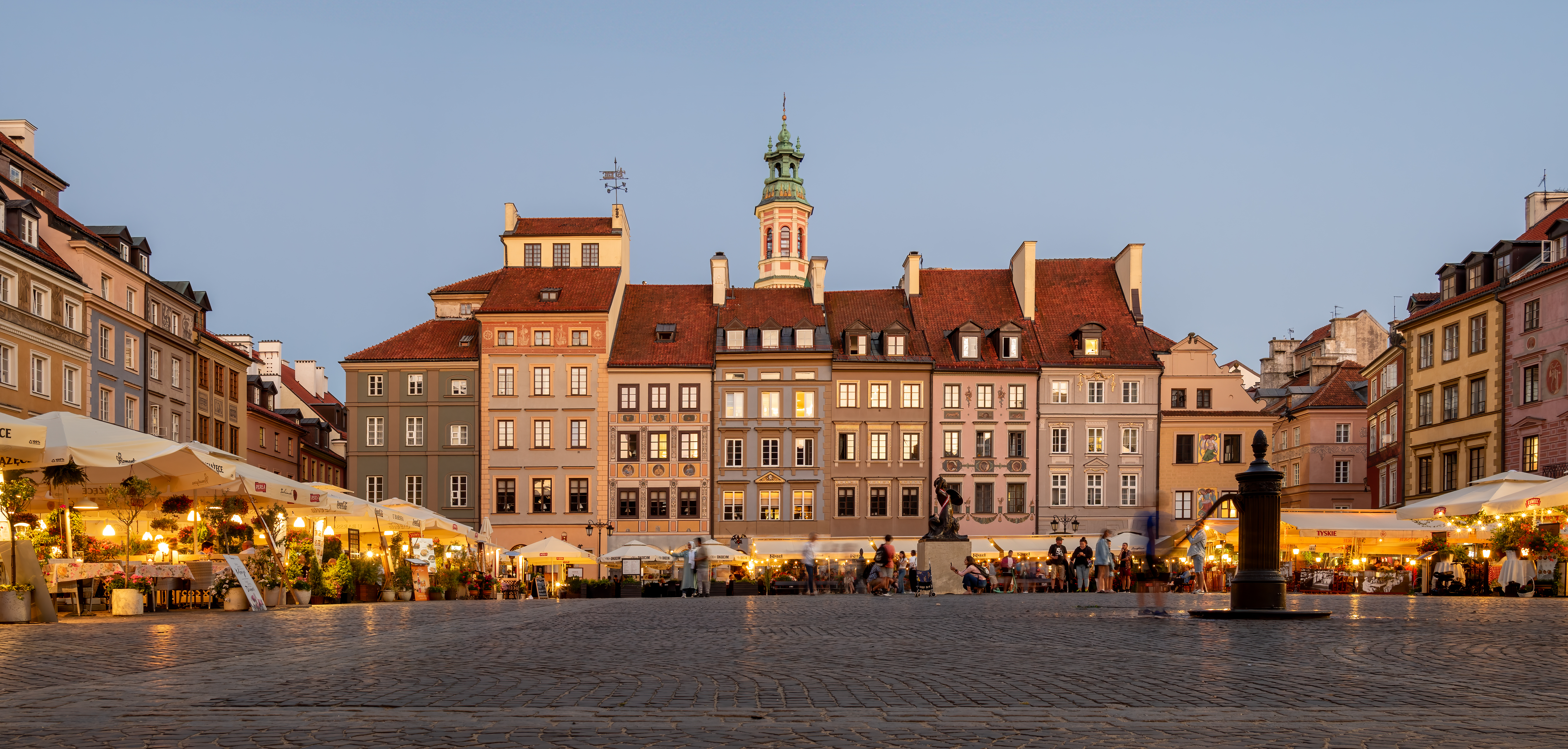
Zakrzewski's Side

=== Details ===
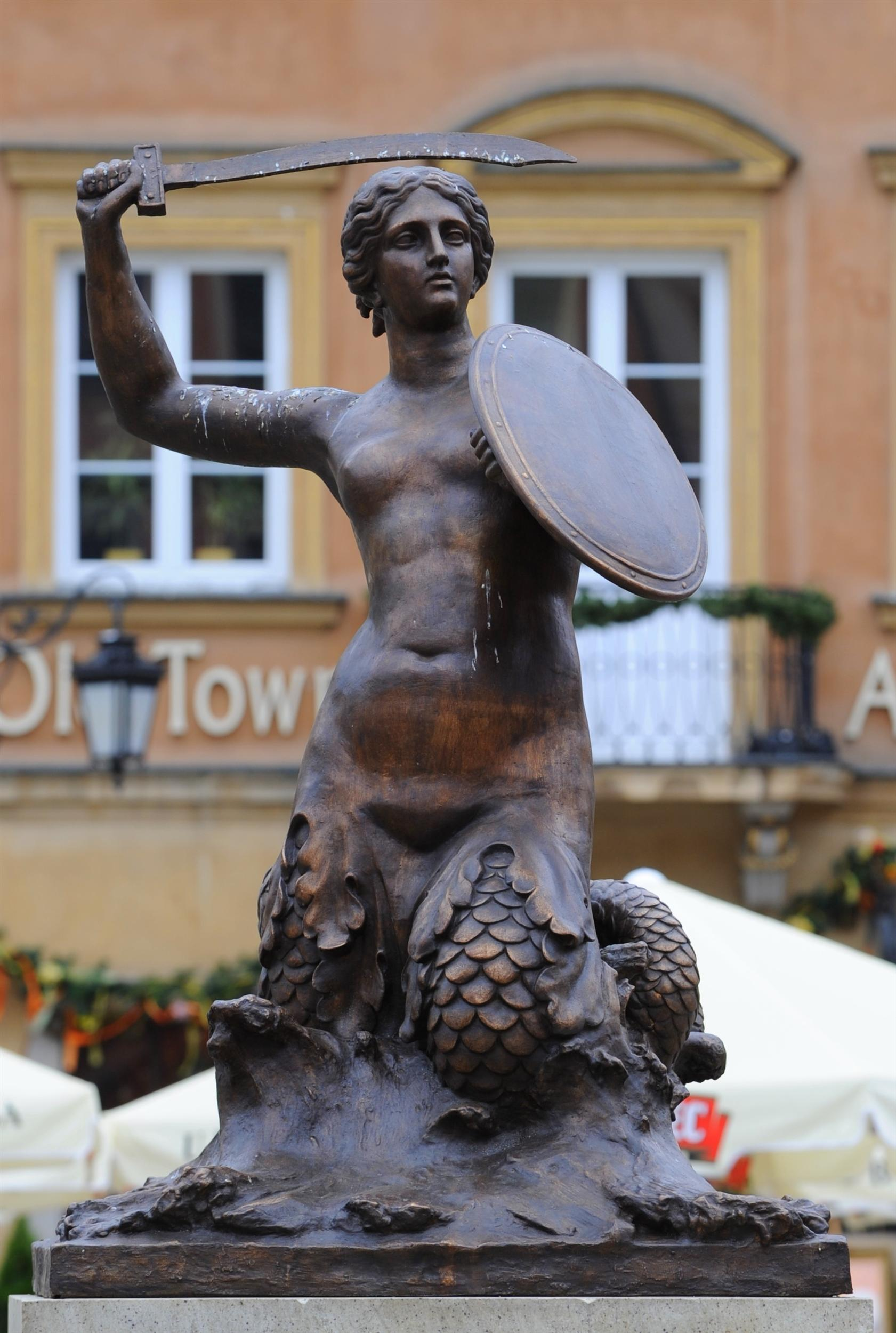
The Warsaw Mermaid

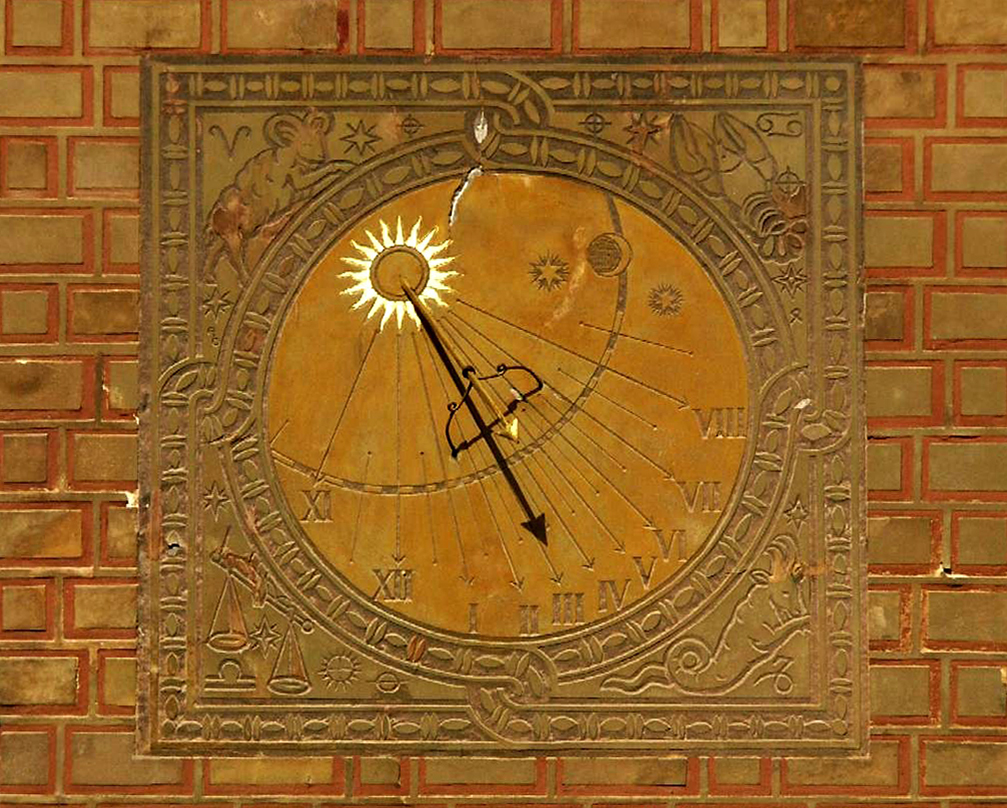
Wall sundial (Zakrzewski's Side)

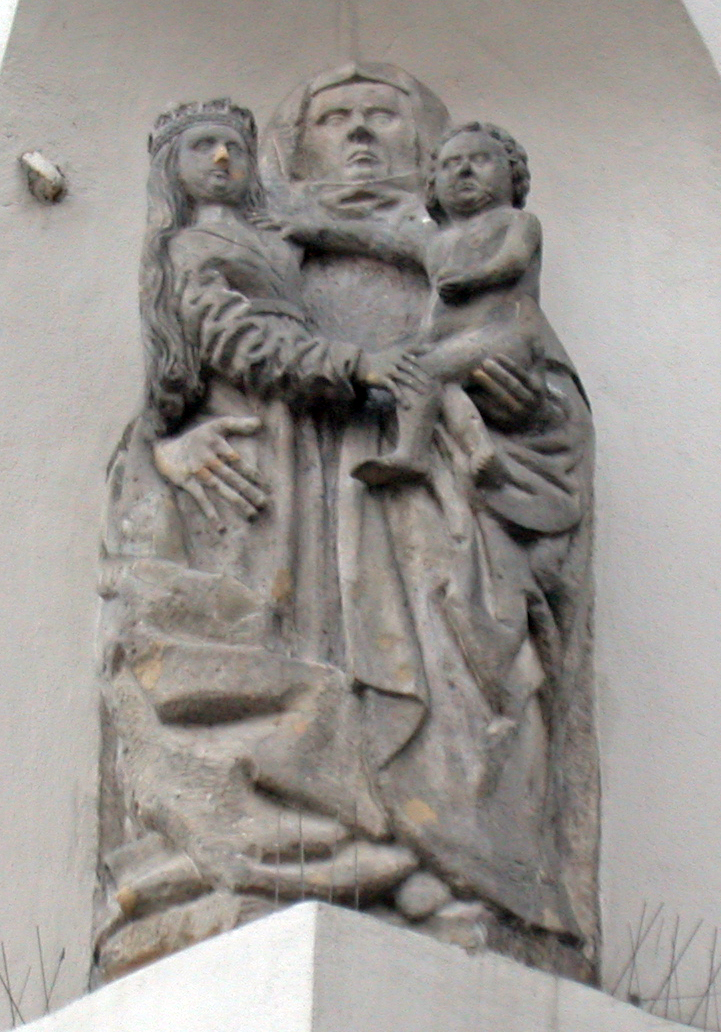
16th-century statue of Saint Anne (Kołłątaj's Side)

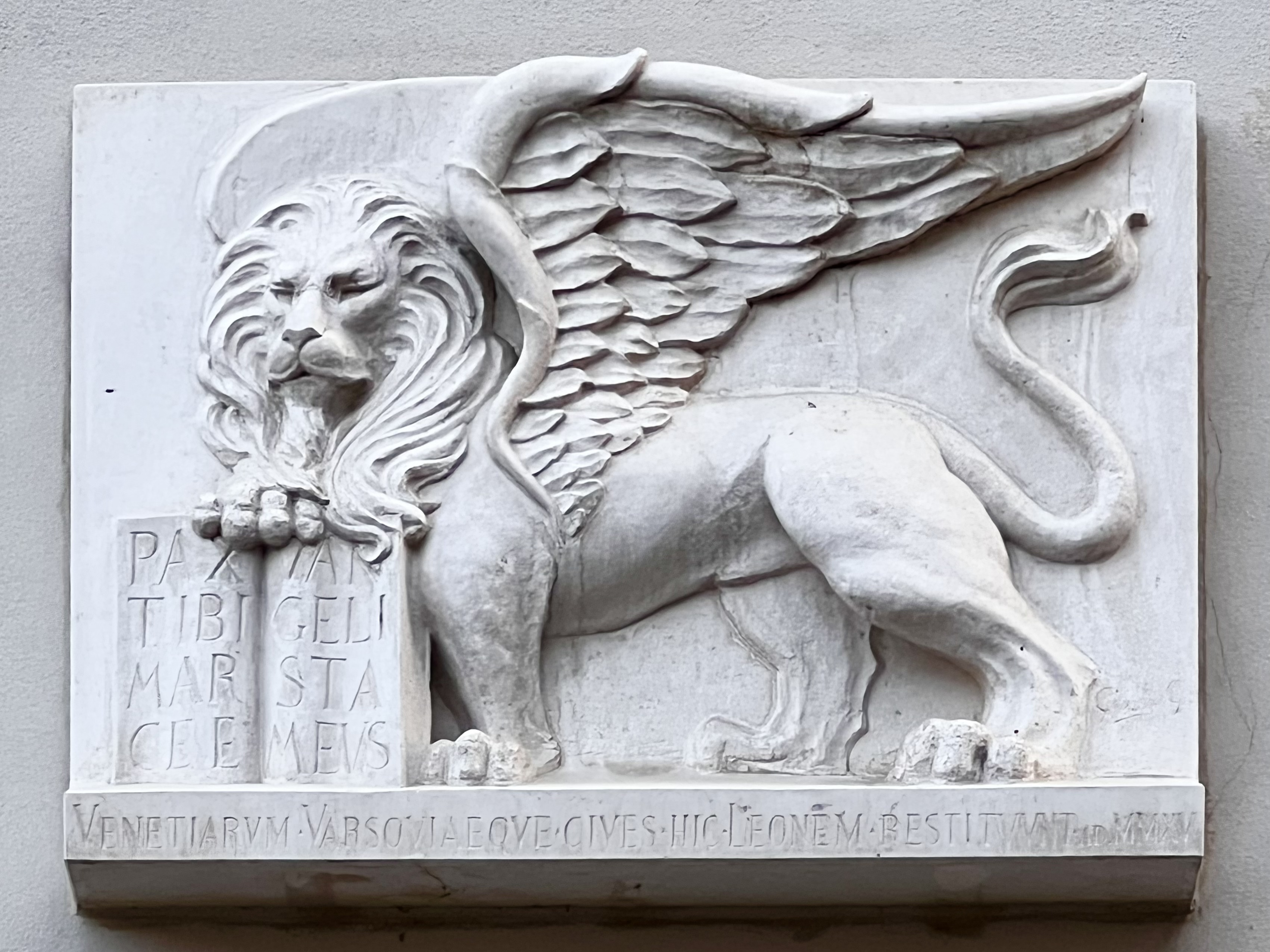
Venetian Lion (Kołłątaj's Side)

== See also ==
- Castle Square, Warsaw
- Warsaw New Town
- Market Square (Lviv)
