= New Town, Warsaw =

New Town
- Neighbourhood and City Information System area
- Nowe Miasto
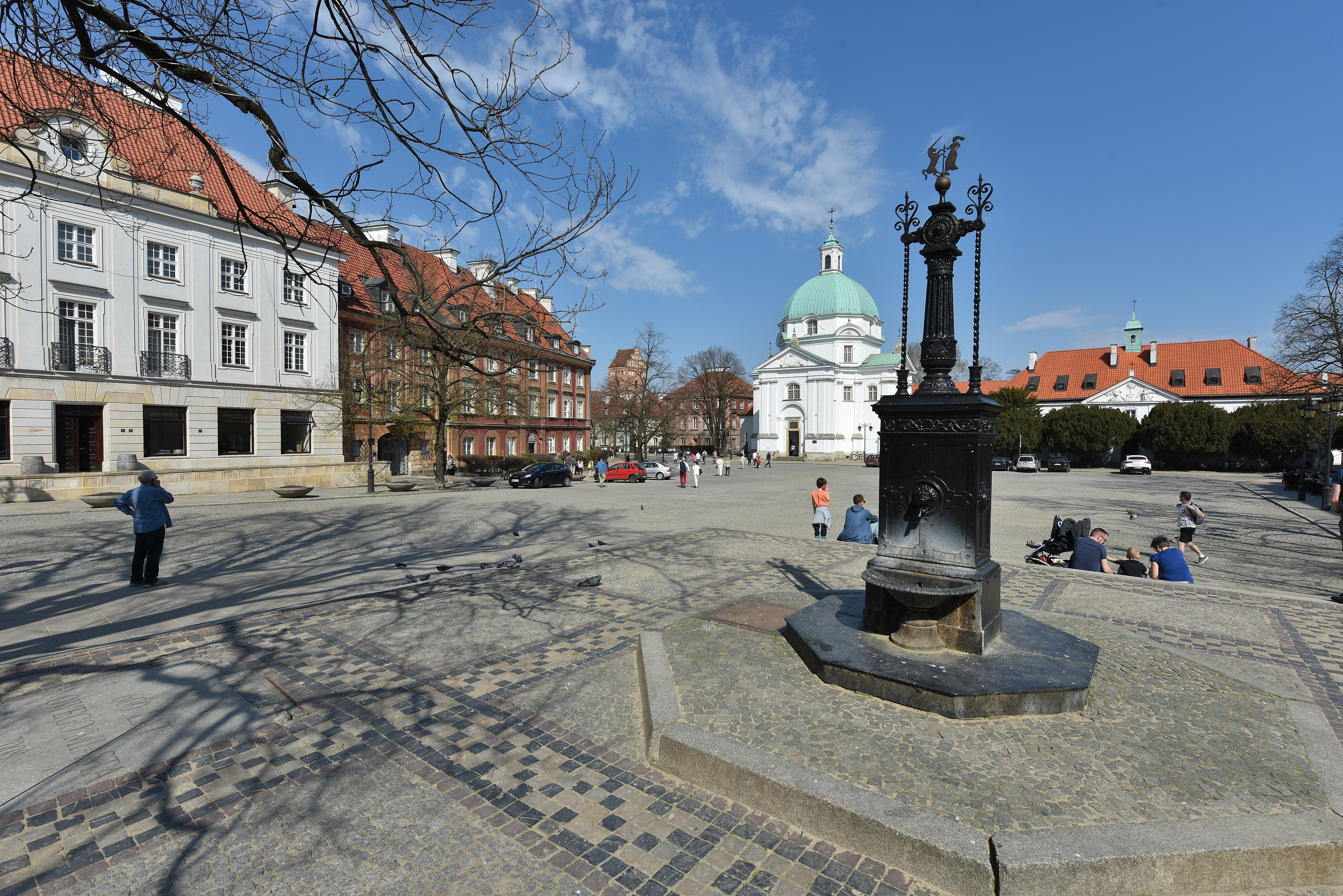
- New Town Market Place in 2017.

- The location of the neighbourhood of New Town in the district of Śródmieście, in accordance to the City Information System.
- Coordinates: 52°15′10″N 21°00′29″E
- Country: Poland
- Voivodeship: Masovian Voivodeship
- City county: Warsaw
- District: Śródmieście
- Municipal neighbourhood: Staromiejskie
- Time zone: UTC+1 (CET)
  - Summer (DST): UTC+2 (CEST)

New Town, Polish: Nowe Miasto, historically known as New Warsaw (Note: New Warsaw: Polish: Nowa Warszawa; Latin: Nova Varsovia) is a neighbourhood, and an area of the City Information System, in the city of Warsaw, Poland, located within the district of Śródmieście.

The town of New Warsaw had been established in the early 15th century, being located to the north from Old Warsaw. In 1791, it had been incorporated into the city of Warsaw.

== History ==
The historic district of the New Town was formed at the turn of the 14th century as an independent city. The official recognition of the New Town occurred in 1408, when it was separated from the Old Town by an act issued by Janusz I the Old, Duke of Masovia. At that time the new city encompassed the territory of the New Town Market Square and streets - Freta, Kościelna, Koźla, Przyrynek, Stara and Zakroczymska. It was independent from the Old Town authorities and had its own vogt, council and a town hall. In 1411 the Parish Church of St. Mary was erected, and according to the 1546 mensuration there were 204 estates in the Warsaw New Town. The largest investment of that time was the Sigismund Augustus bridge built between 1568 and 1573 by Erazm Cziotko (c. 500 m (1,600 ft) long). Unfortunately it was destroyed in 1603 by the drifting ice floes.

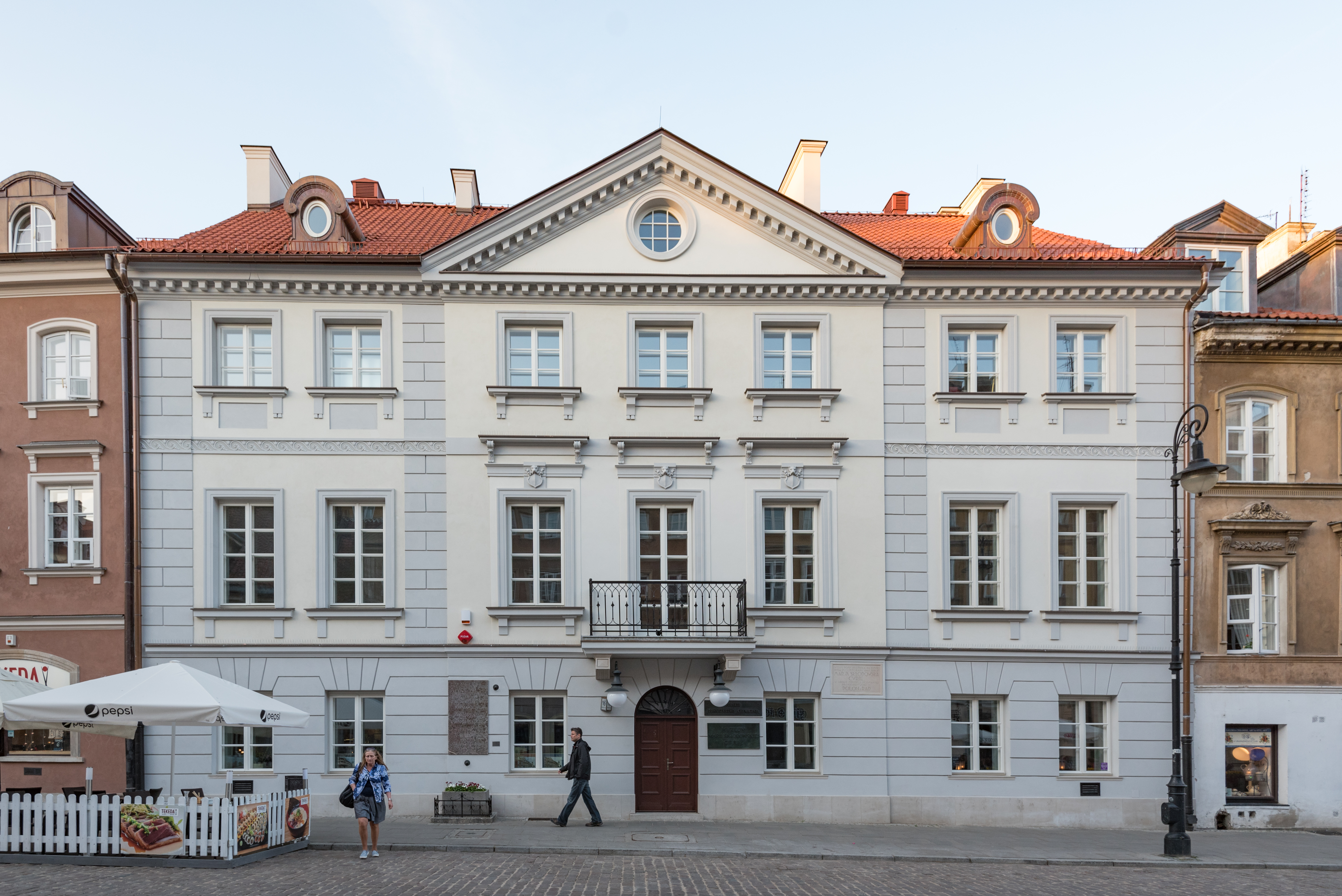
Birthplace of Marie Skłodowska Curie near St. Hyacinth's Church

The disastrous time of the Swedish-Brandenburgian invasion (1655–1660), left the predominantly timber buildings of the New Town burned, but because of those events many beautiful and more permanent buildings were erected (the Town Hall, built in 1680; St. Kazimierz Church, 1688–1692; the Kotowski Palace, 1682–1684; the Holy Spirit Church, 1707–1717; and the ornate chapel of the Kotowski family, constructed between 1691 and 1694) by the most prominent Warsaw architects (especially Tylman Gamerski). After 1791, due to the tenets of the Constitution of May 3, 1791, the New Town was incorporated into the city of Warsaw. That is why the Town Hall was pulled down in 1818.

During the Warsaw Uprising (1 August – 2 October 1944) the New Town was completely destroyed due to the extensive bombardment of the insurgent positions by the Germans. Many historic edifices, that served as hospitals and shelters for the inhabitants were razed to the ground. The reconstruction of the New Town begun in 1954. However, some of the significant buildings were not restored by the Communist authorities (e.g., Kotowski Palace).

== Symbols ==
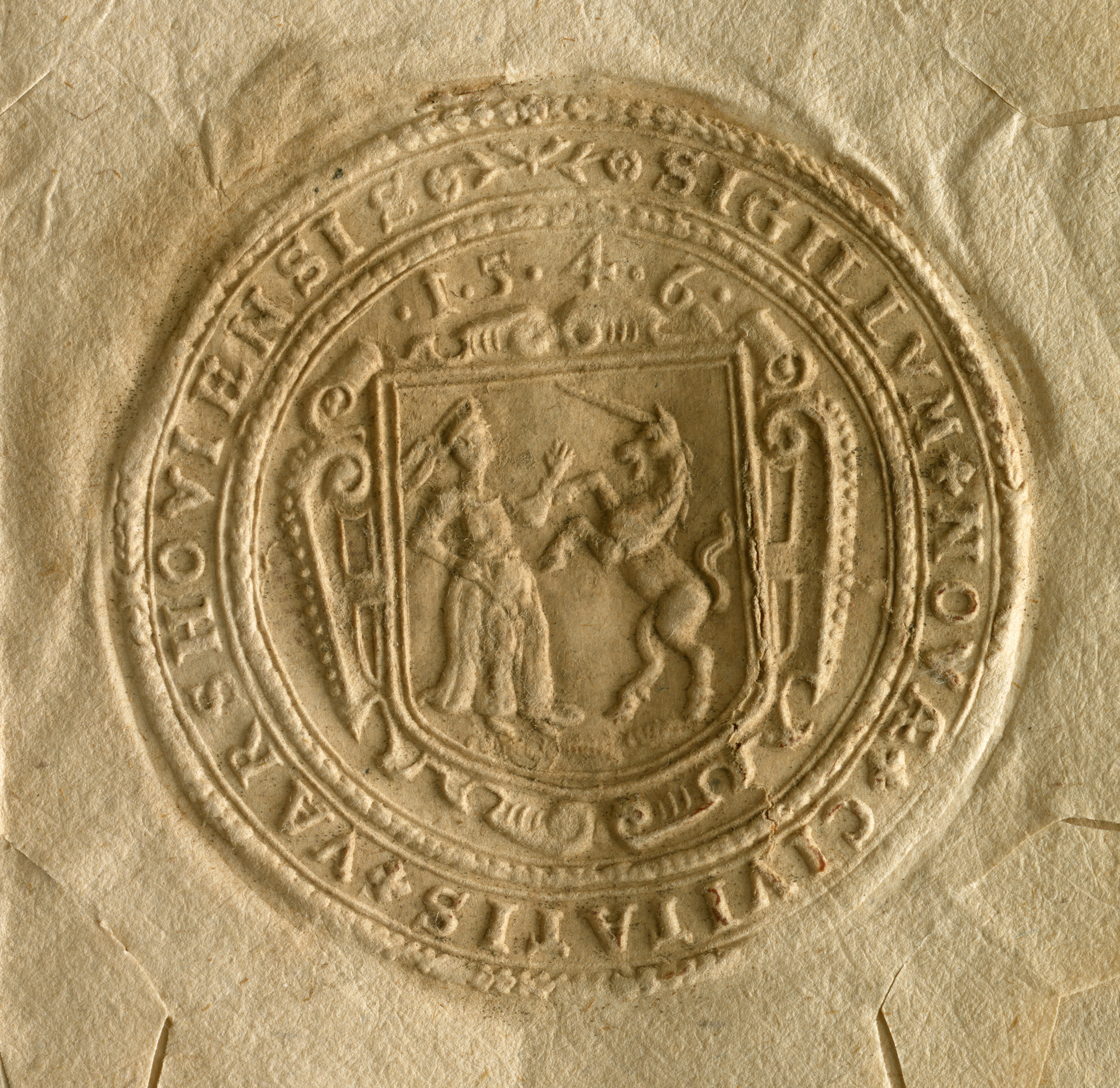
The 1648 seal of New Town.

As a separate territorial entity, the New Town was using its own seal with a coat of arms. A version known from 1648 features a female figure and a unicorn standing on its back feet. It can be found in the Central Archive of Historical Records. The inscription in the rim is in Latin: "SIGILLUM * NOVA * CIVITATIS * VARSCHOVIENSIS". In the Middle Ages, the image of a virgin with a unicorn on her knees was a frequent motif of Christian art as a symbol of the Blessed Virgin Mary, and the unicorn itself symbolized Christ.

After the incorporation of the New Town into Warsaw, the Warsaw Mermaid began to be used as the coat of arms. The image of a girl with a unicorn can still be found in the main square, it decorates the top of the well in front of the St. Kazimierz Church. An eclectic cast-iron well from the second half of the nineteenth century set up there around 1957.

== Gallery ==
=== Historical images ===
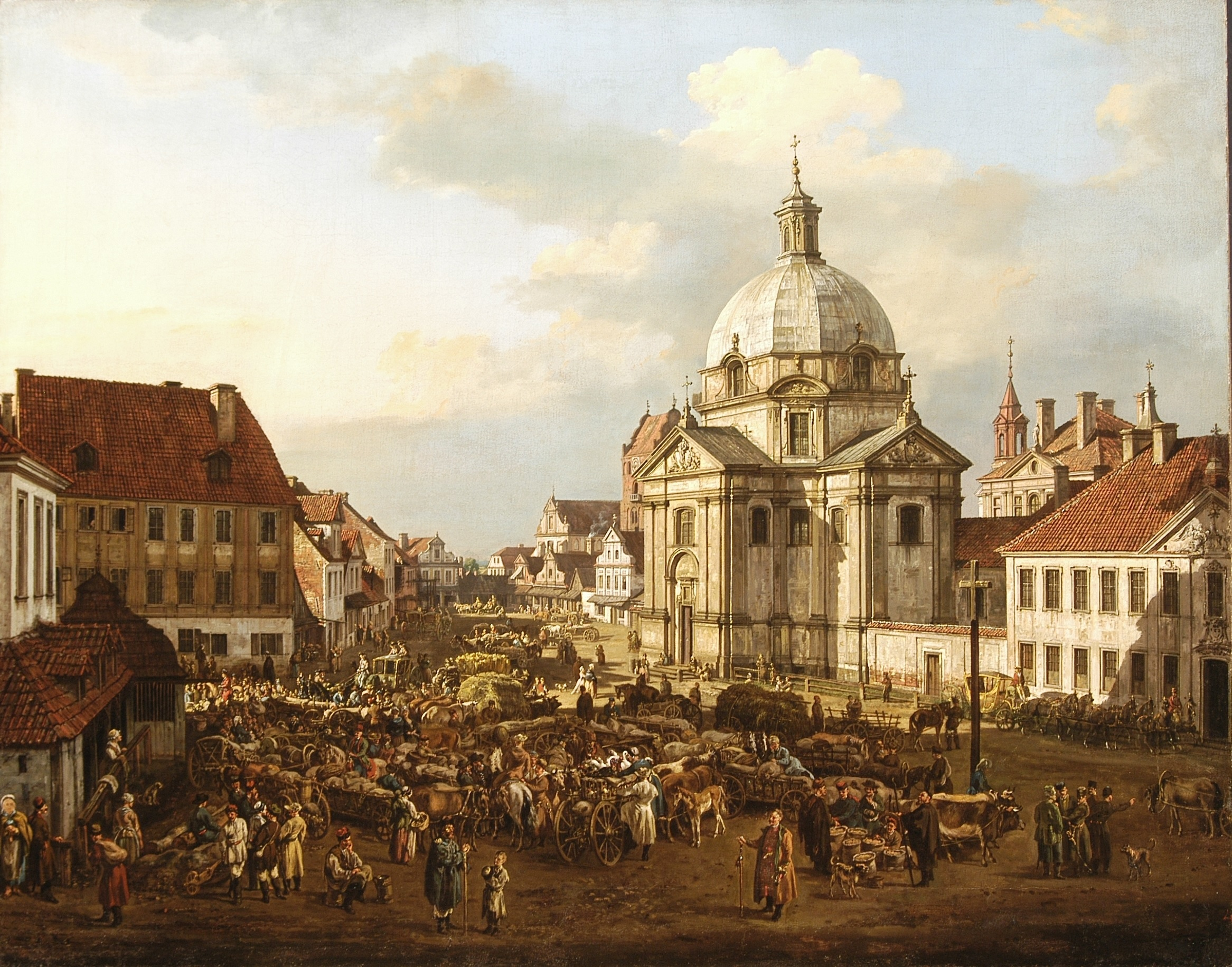
The New Town by Bernardo Bellotto

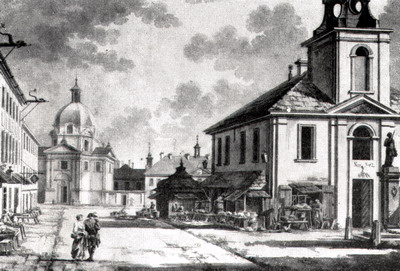
The Nowe Miasto Town Hall in 1784

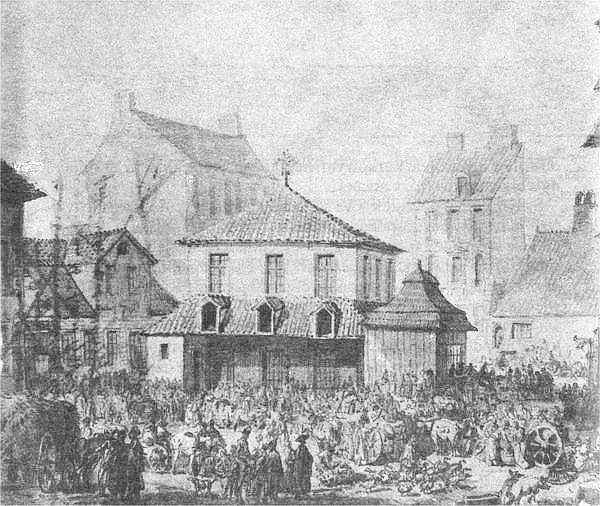
The New Town by Jan Piotr Norblin

=== Churches ===
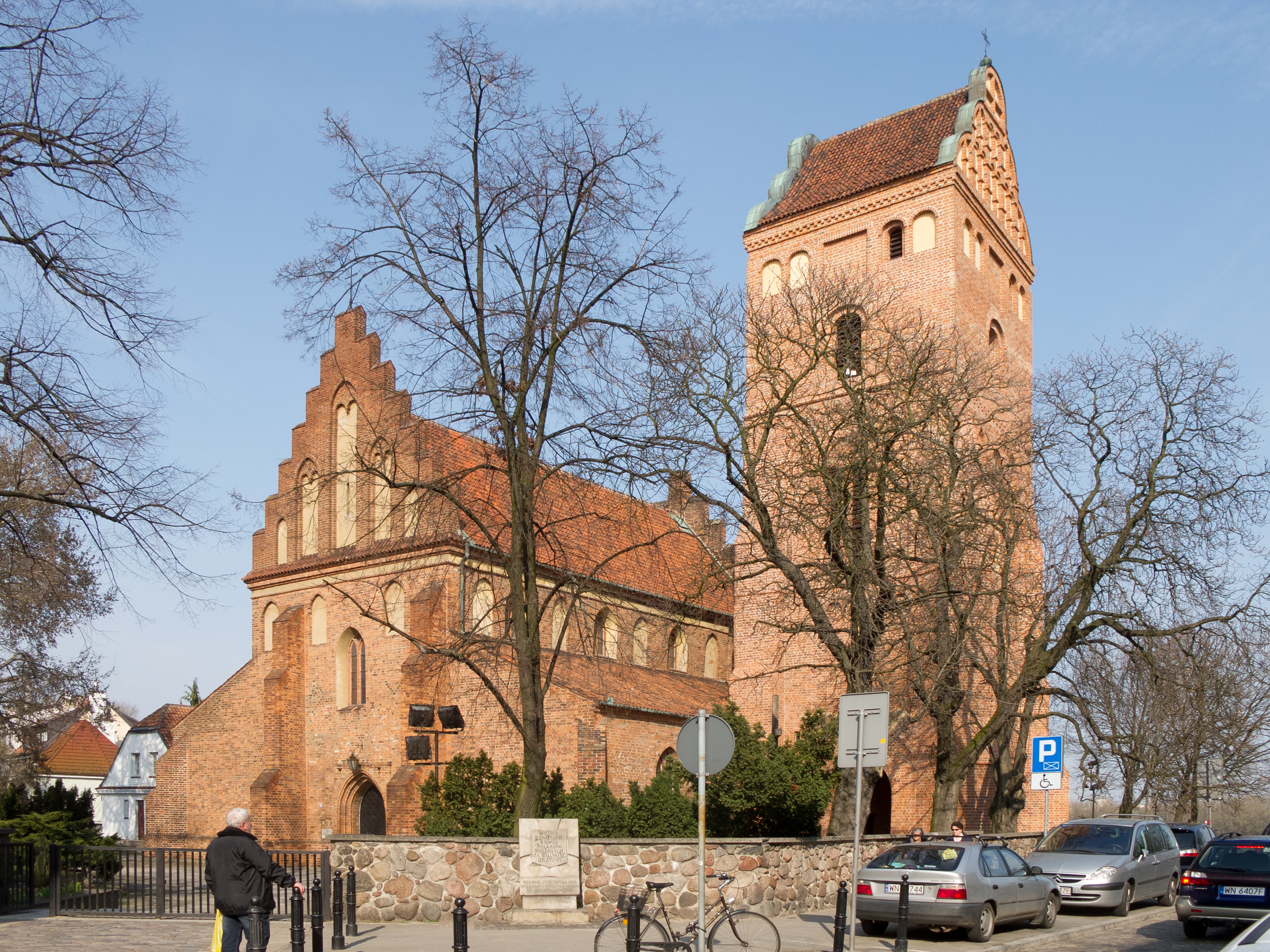
St. Mary's Church, 1411

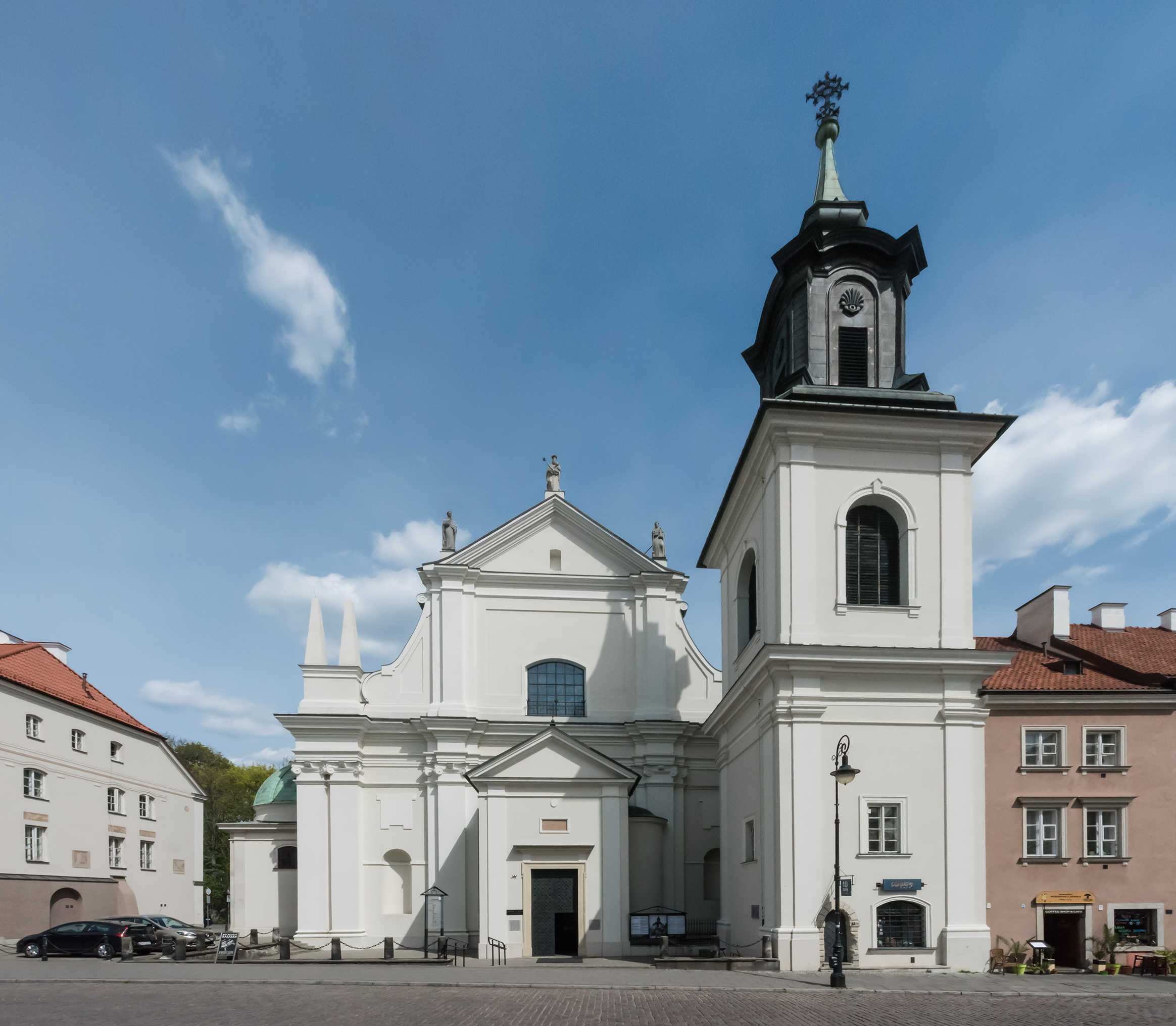
St. Hyacinth's Church, 1603-1639

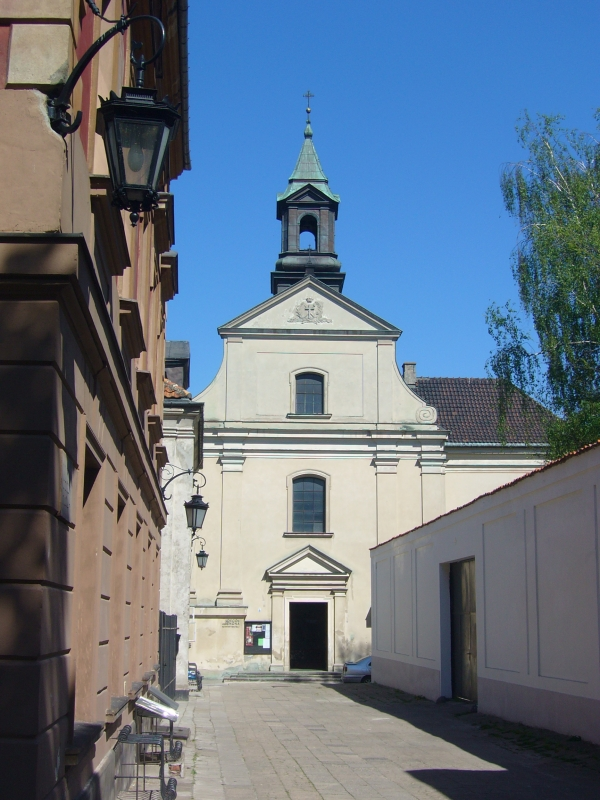
St. Benno Church, 1669

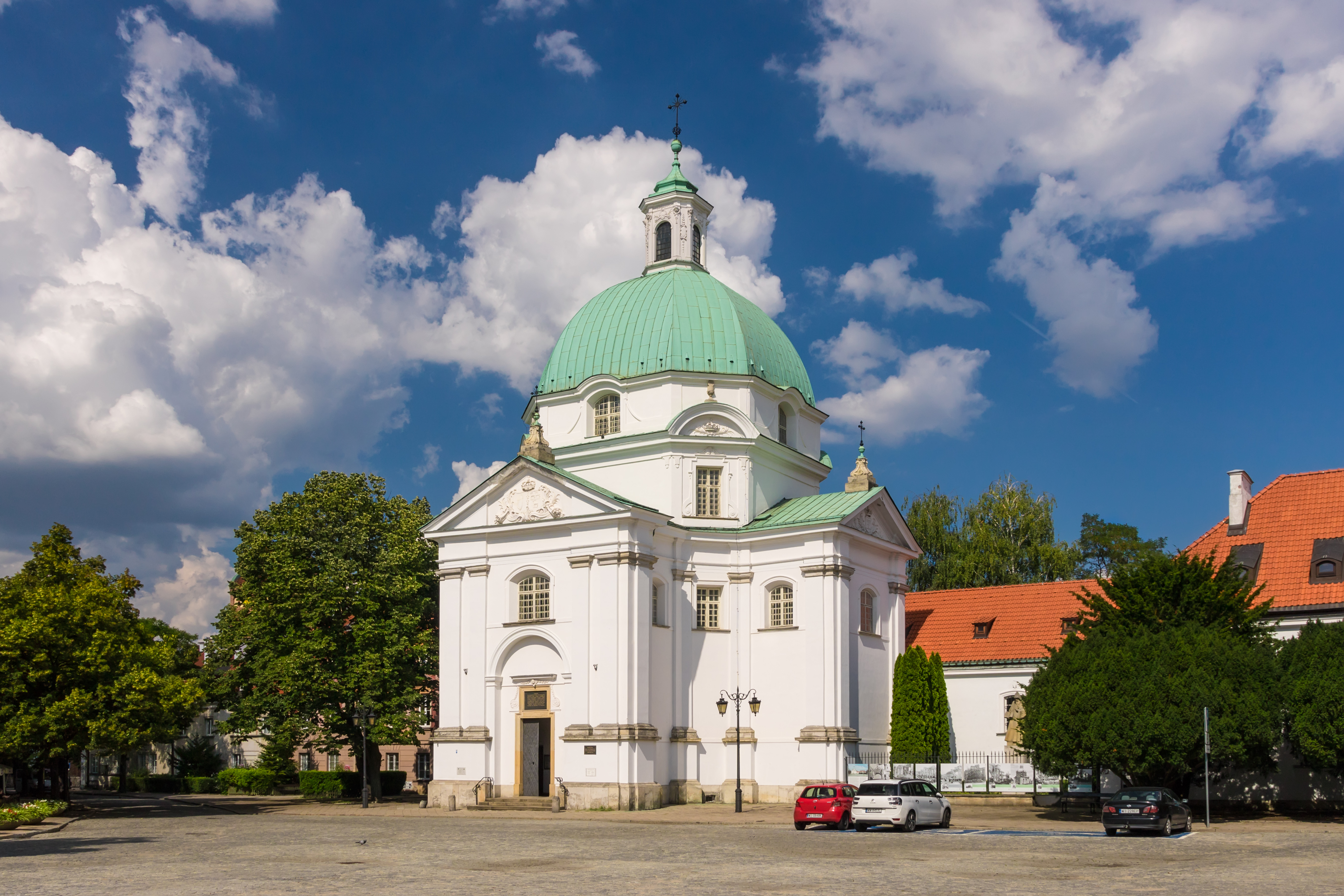
St. Kazimierz Church, 1688-1692

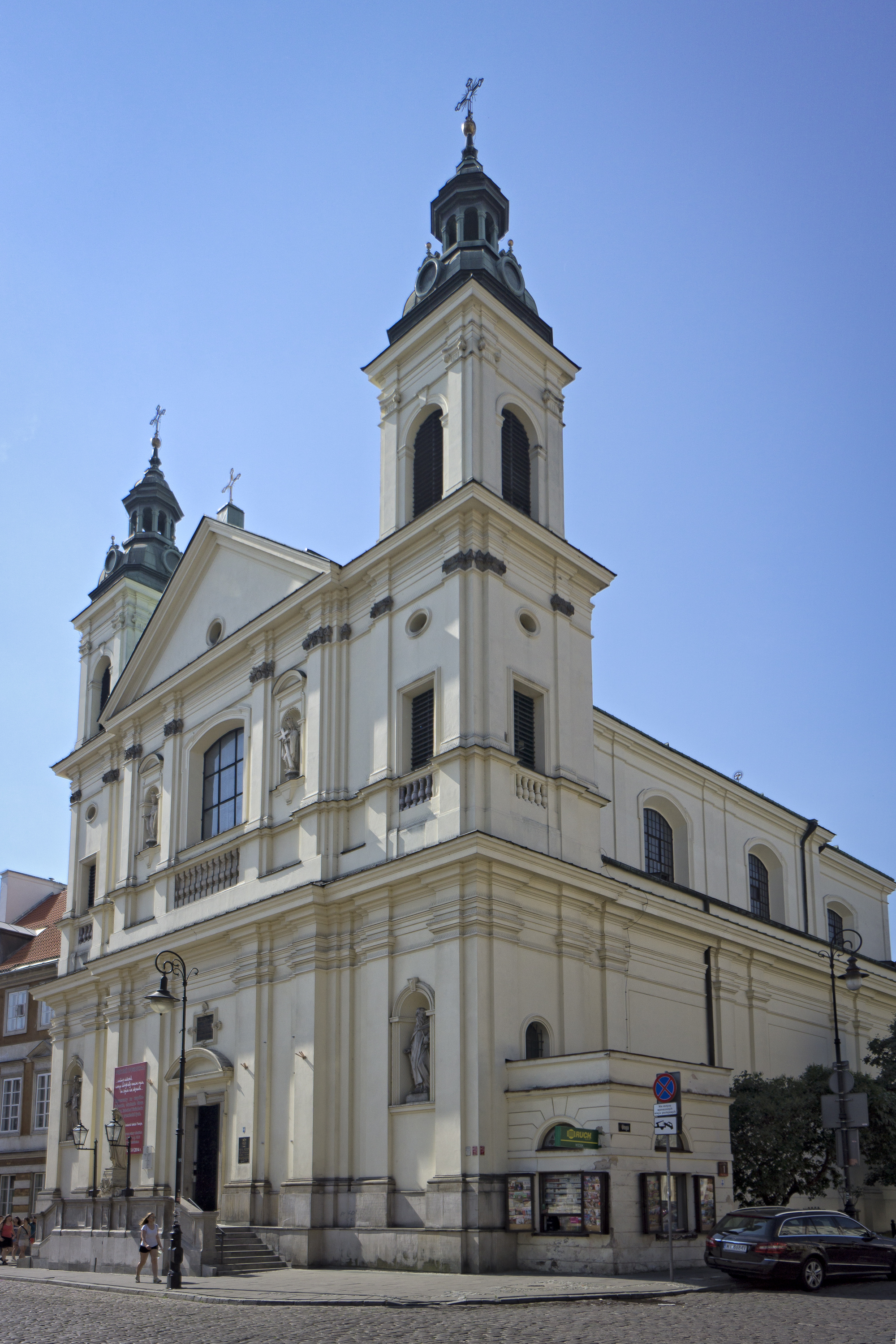
Holy Spirit Church, 1717

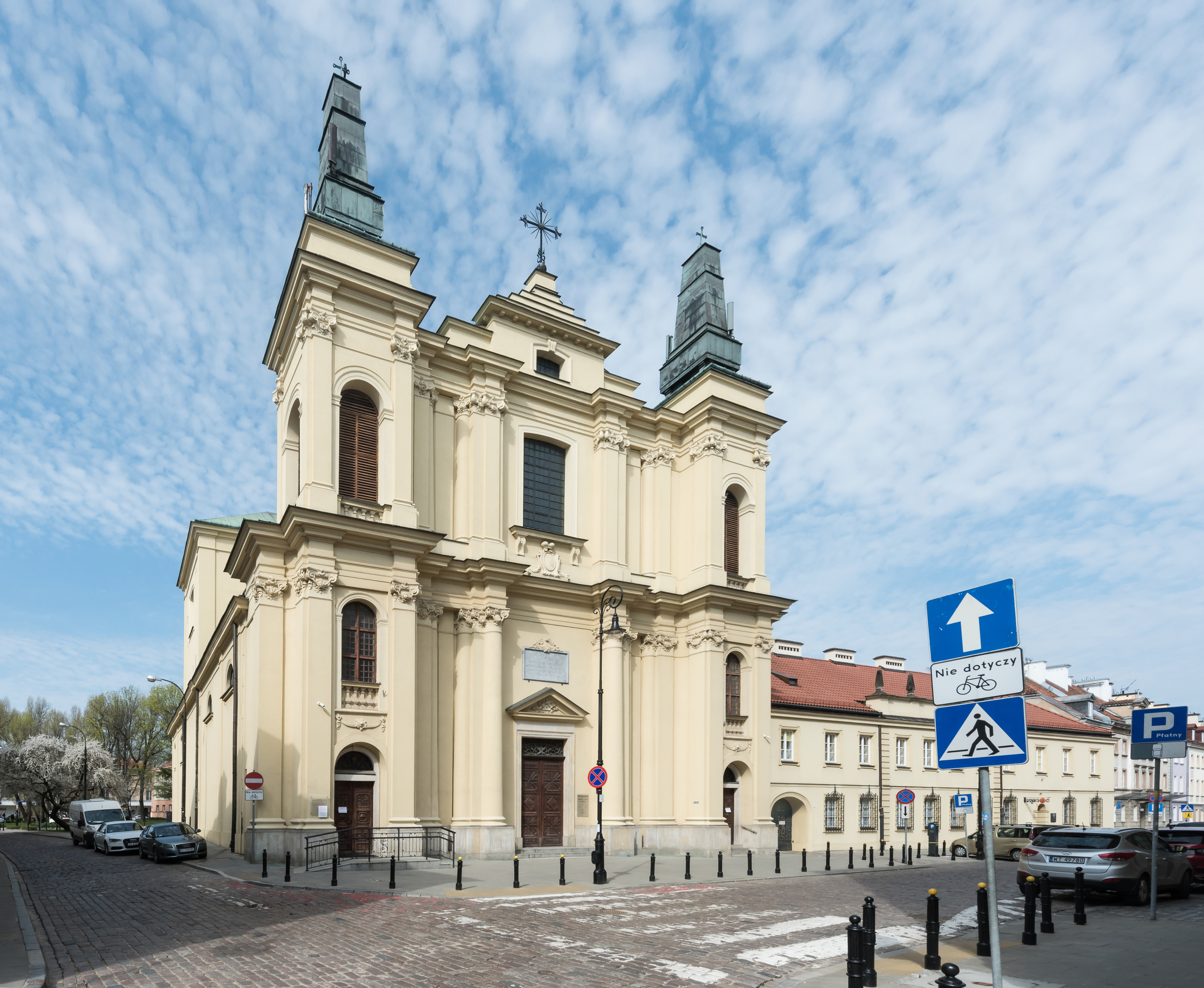
St. Francis Church, 1733

=== Others ===
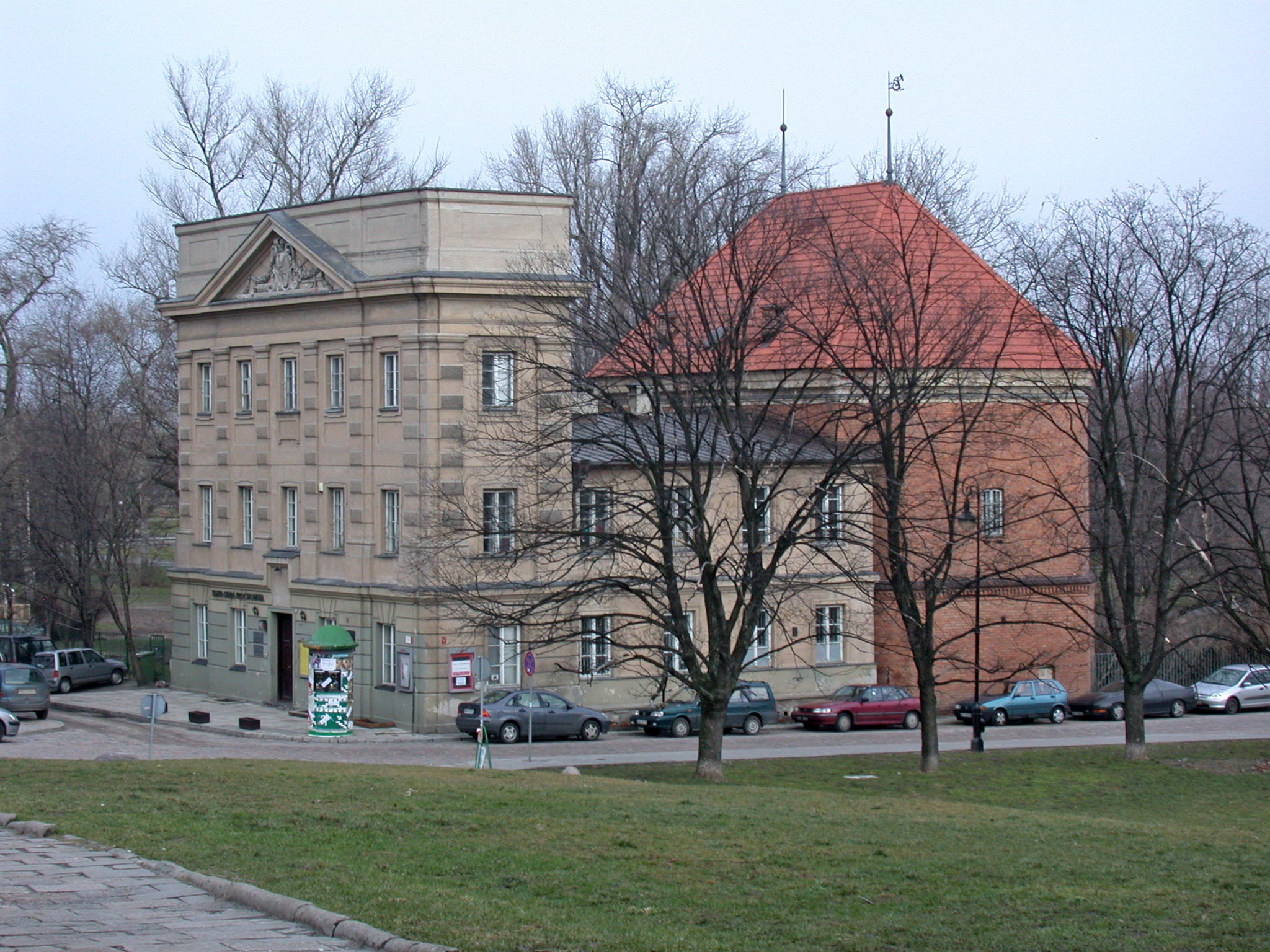
Old Bridge Gate, 1582

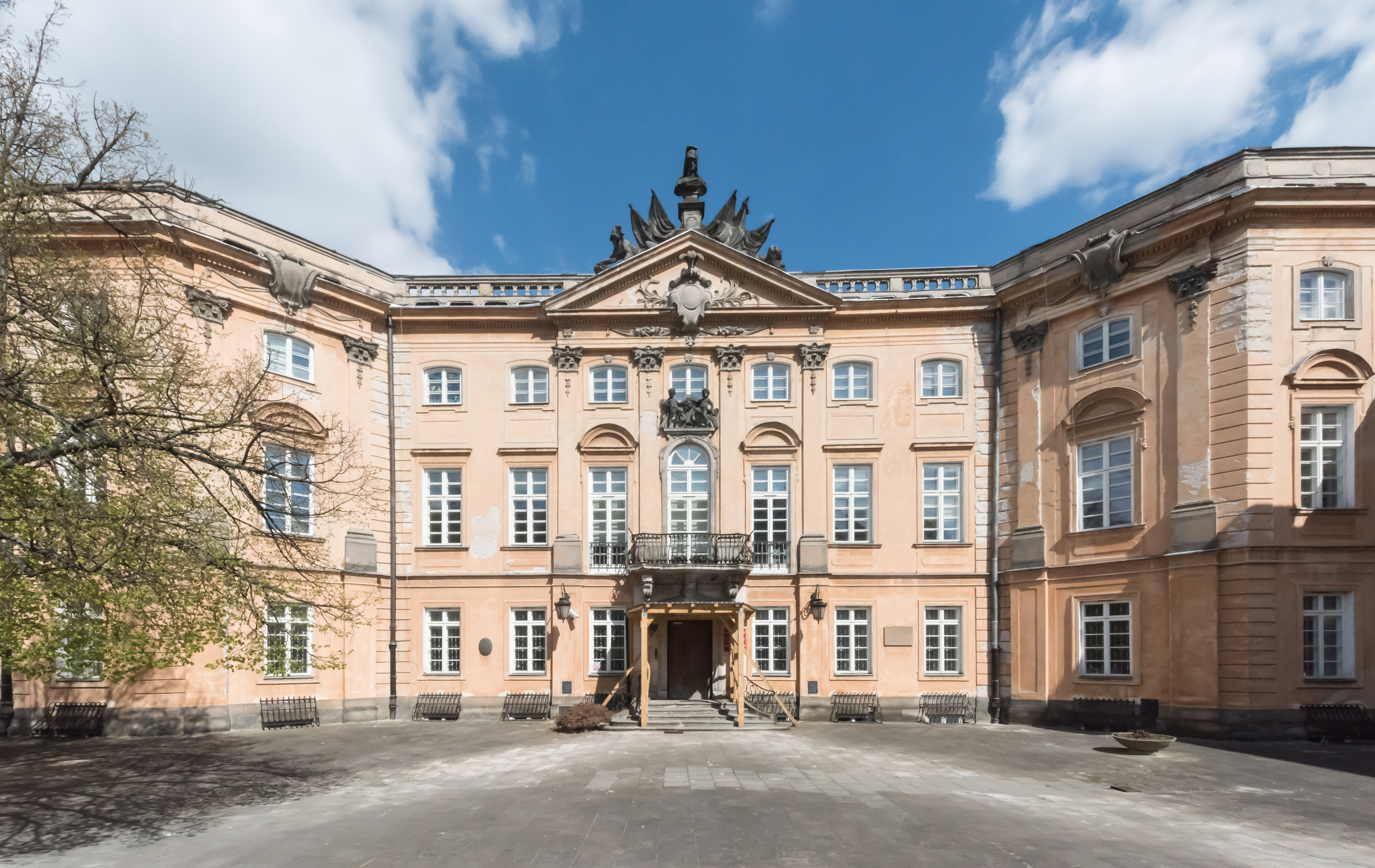
Sapieha Palace, 1731-36

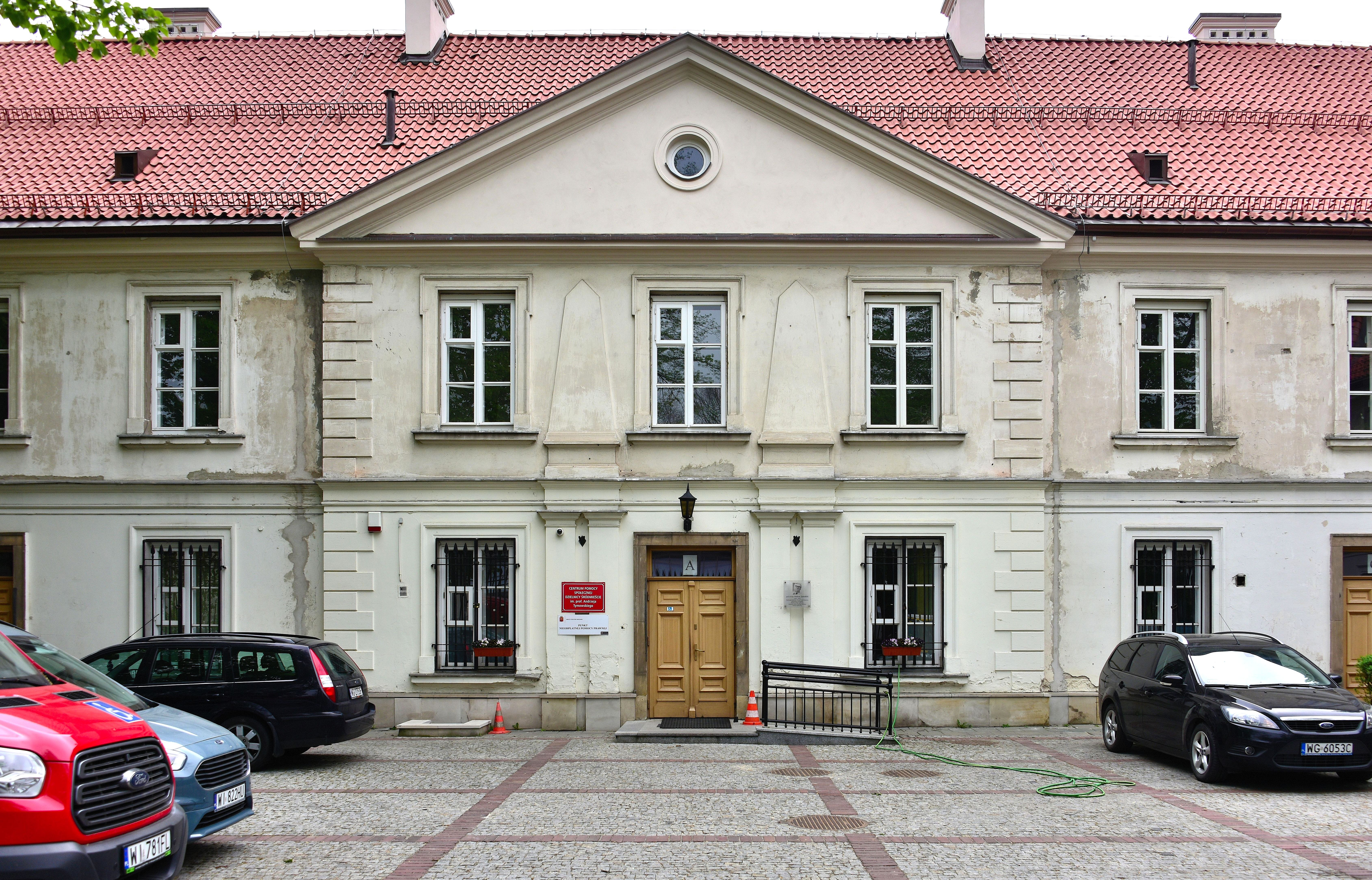
Sierakowski Palace, 1784

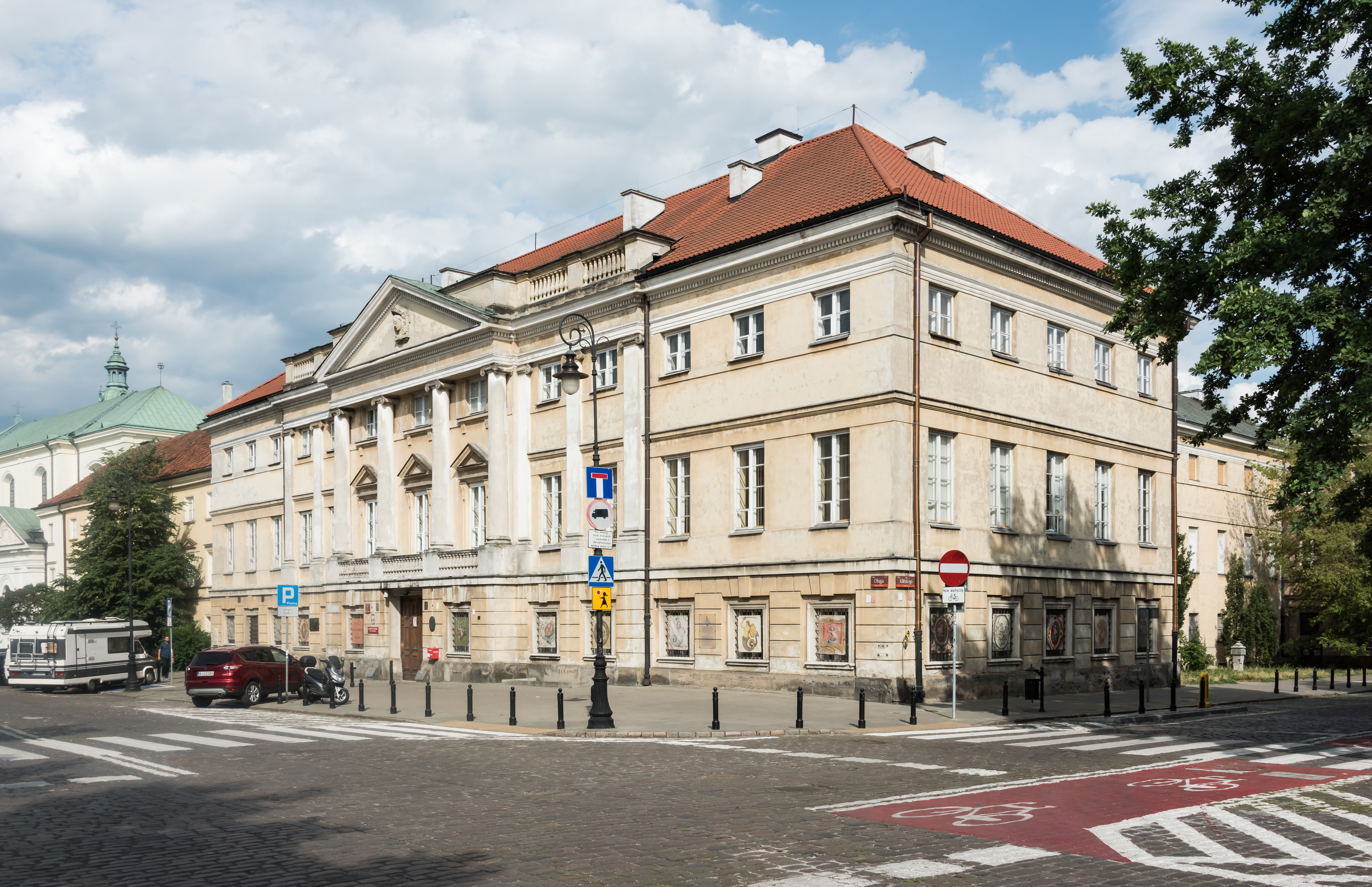
Raczyński Palace, 1786

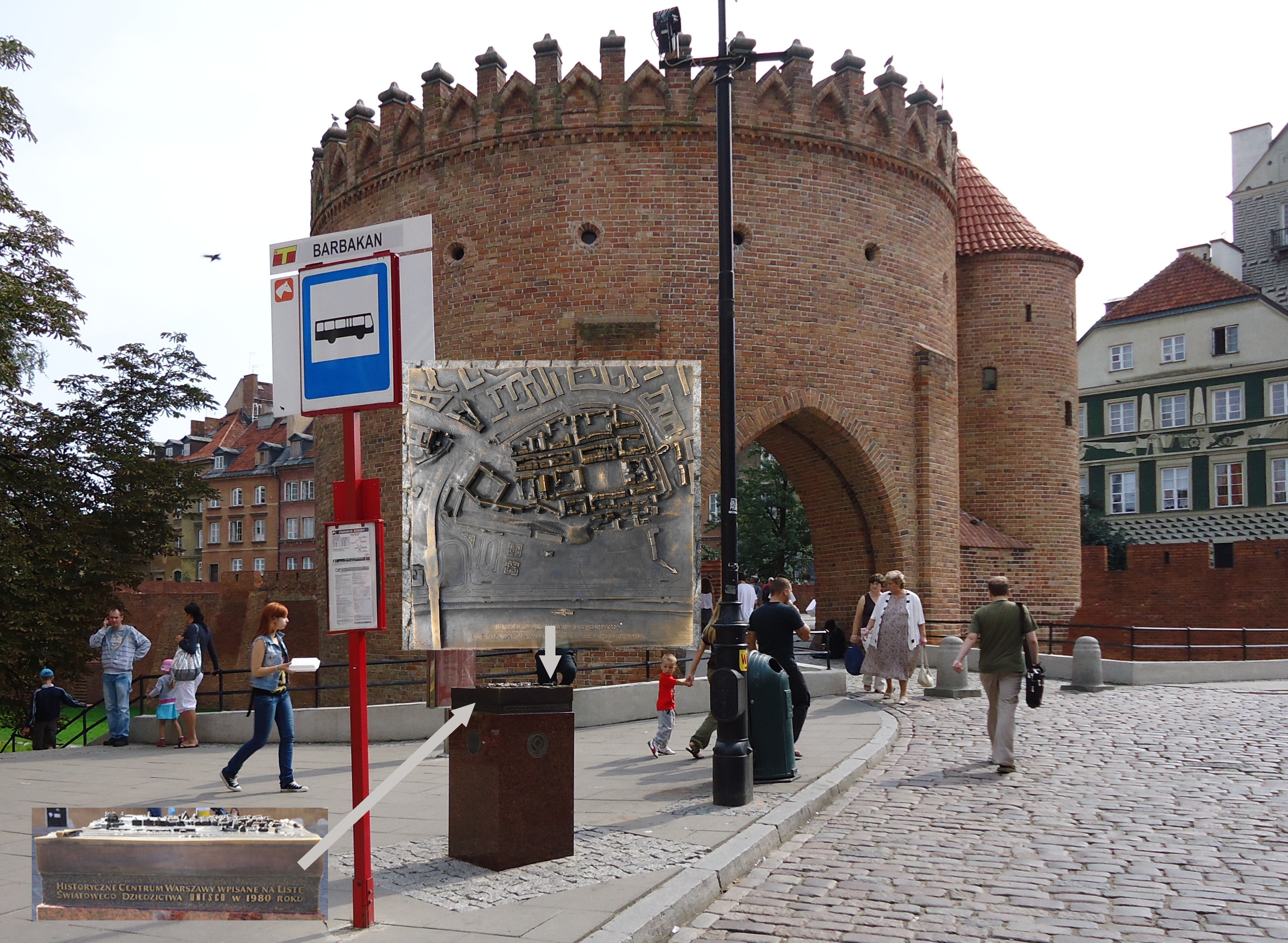
The historical center of Warsaw

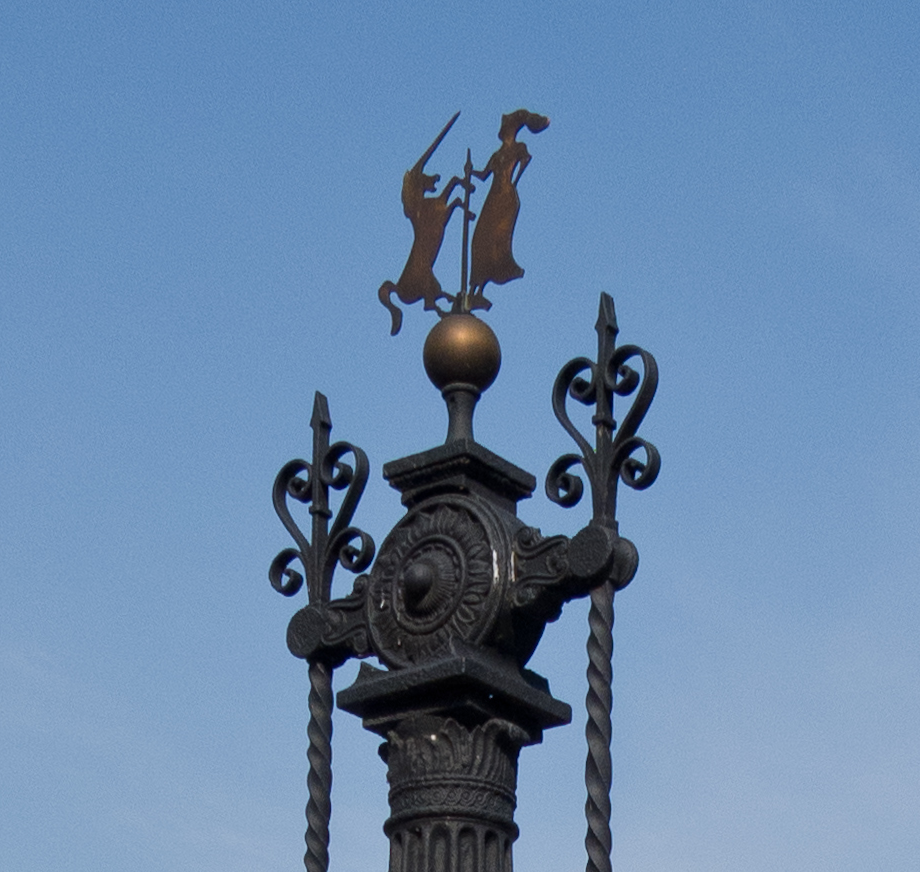
The unicorn well at the main square

== See also ==
- Old Town, Warsaw
- Samborska Street
