= Sambor =

Sambor may refer to:

== People ==
- Sambor, a prince of Rugia (Rügen)
- Sambor I, Duke of Pomerania (c. 1150 – c. 1207), regent of Pomerelia
- Sambor II, Duke of Pomerania (c. 1212 – c. 1278, duke of Pomerania and prince of Lubiszewo Tczewskie

== Places ==
- Sambir, Ukraine
  - Sambor Ghetto
- Sambor, Altai Krai, Russia
- Sambor Key, island in Florida, United States
- Sombor, a city in West Bačka District, Serbia
- Samobor, a city in Zagreb County, Croatia
- Sambor Dam, a proposed dam and hydroelectric power station on the Mekong, in Prek Kampi District, Kratie Province, Cambodia
- Staryi Sambir, Ukraine

== See also ==
- Sambor Prei Kuk, an historical site north of the town of Kampong Thom, Cambodia
- Samborski (disambiguation)
- Samborzec, a village in Sandomierz County, Świętokrzyskie Voivodeship, south-central Poland
- Sambro (disambiguation)
