= Samborski =

Samborski may refer to the following:

- Leszek Samborski Polish politician, Member of Parliament
- Bogusław Samborski (1897–1971), Polish actor and German collaborator
- Samoborski Otok, Samobor, Zagreb County, Croatia
- Somborski SK, a football club from Sombor, Serbia
- of or relating to Sambor a historically Polish city currently located in Ukraine

== See also ==
- Sambor (disambiguation)
- Samborska Street, Warsaw, Poland
- Eric Semborski (born 1993), American ice hockey player
- Samborsko, Gmina Jastrowie, Złotów County, Greater Poland Voivodeship, Poland
