= St. Hyacinth's Church, Warsaw =

Coordinates: 52°15′5″N 21°0′32″E

St. Hyacinth's Church Kościół św. Jacka (in Polish)
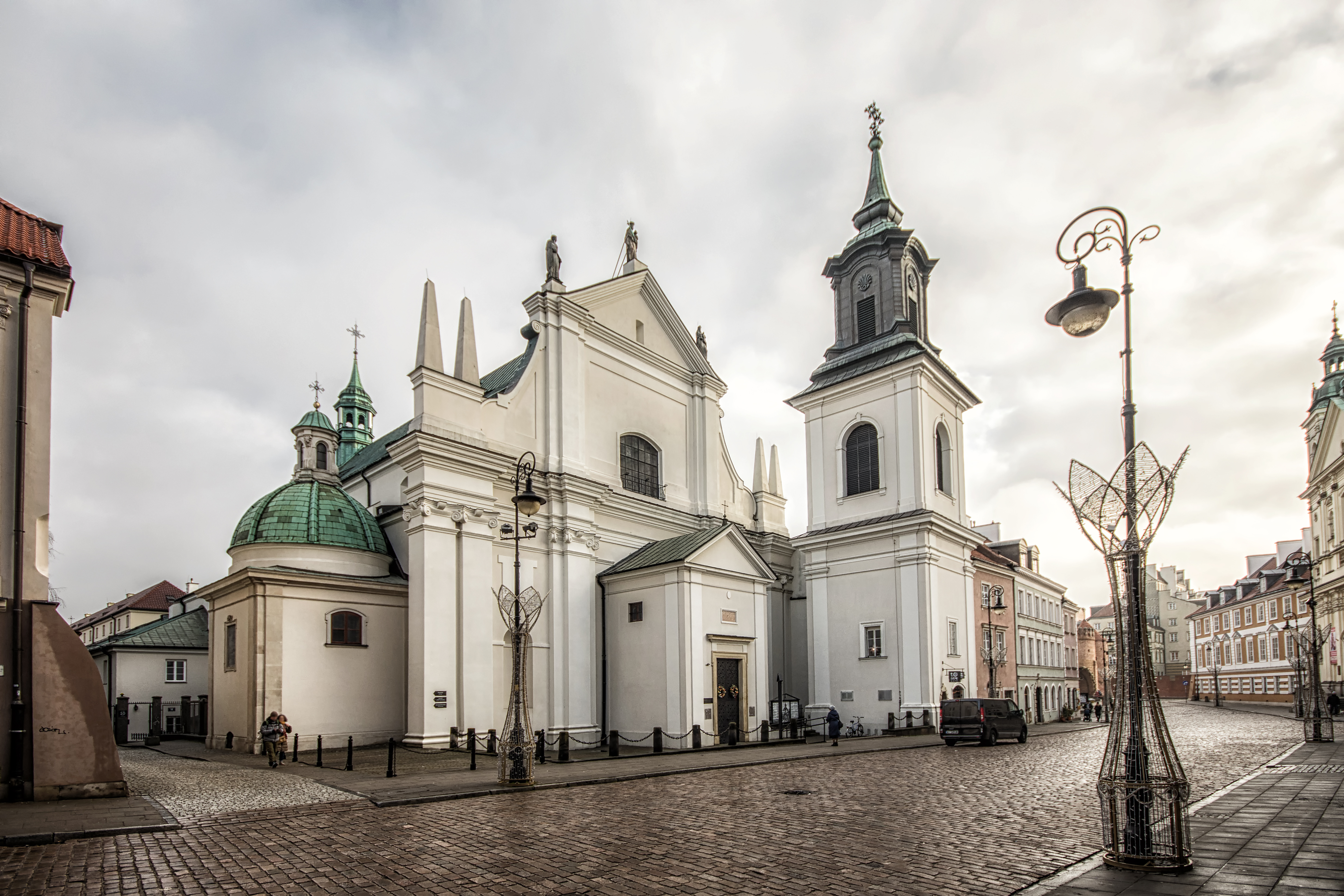
- St. Hyacinth's Church; Kościół św. Jacka (in Polish)
- Location: Warsaw
- Country: Poland
- Denomination: Catholic

Architecture
- Architect: Giovanni Battista Trevano for the Dominican Order
- Style: Baroque (largely)
- Groundbreaking: 1603
- Completed: 1639
- Demolished: 1944

Administration
- Archdiocese: Warsaw

Historic Monument of Poland
- Designated: 1994-09-08
- Part of: Warsaw – historic city center with the Royal Route and Wilanów
- Reference no.: M.P. 1994 nr 50 poz. 423

St. Hyacinth's Church (Polish: Kościół św. Jacka), named after Saint Hyacinth of Poland, is a Baroque Catholic church building located in Warsaw's New Town at Freta Street 8/10.

== History ==
St. Hyacinth's Church was founded by the Dominican Order and adjoins Warsaw's largest monastery. The church is largely early Baroque in appearance, but also comprises Renaissance and Gothic Revival elements in the apse (arches, vaults). Its construction began in 1603 and it was completed in 1639.

During the construction and shortly afterwards the church was encompassed with ornate chapels. In 1627 Jadwiga Mińska established the Holy Cross Chapel, the so-called Dark Chapel, and in 1651 the Royal Musicians founded the Chapel of Our Lady of the Snows.

When Warsaw was captured by Swedish and Brandenburgian forces in 1655, the church shared the same fate as other buildings in the city. it was ransacked and burned. After the war it was rebuilt and consecrated in 1661 by bishop Wojciech Tolibowski, the bishop of Poznań. In 1662 the bell tower was erected, adjacent to the church, and in 1690 the Wyszogród pantler Adam Kotowski established the most important church feature - the St. Dominic Chapel. The ornate baroque building was constructed according to the design by prominent Warsaw architect Tylman Gamerski.

The 18th century was the age of the church's greatest prosperity. The monastery's library possessed the richest collection of volumes in Poland. Unfortunately it was later completely destroyed.

During World War II, the church and monastery served the Polish forces in the Warsaw Uprising as a field hospital. This fact turned these buildings into targets of frequent bombings by the Germans. During the bombardments over a thousand civilians and insurgents were killed.

== Interior ==
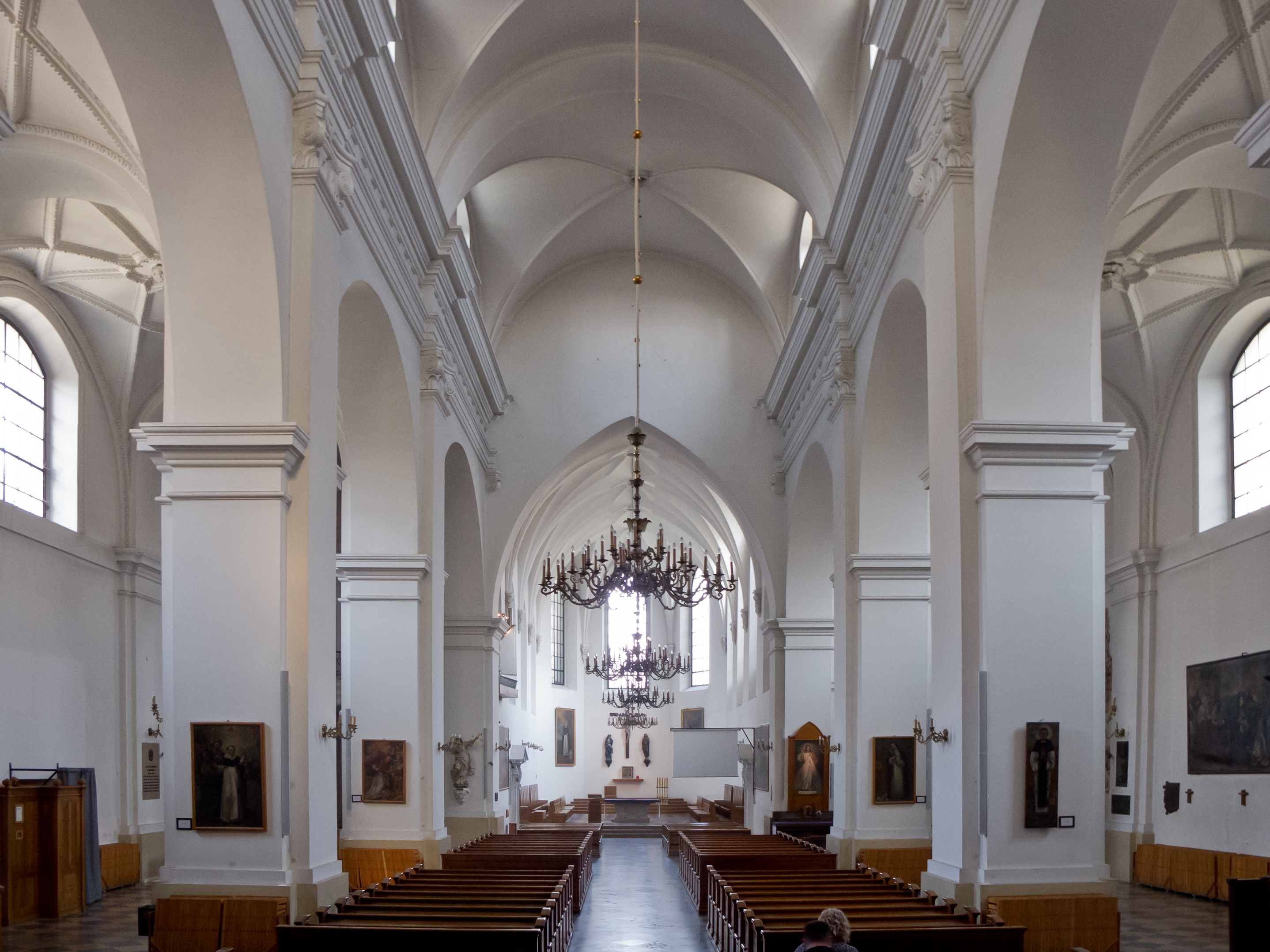
Interior of St. Hyacinth's Church

The facade is baroque, although the interior is completely modern, because very few of the original furnishings of the church were preserved. Among them, the most interesting are the tomb monuments - the mannerist tomb of Katarzyna Ossolińska, constructed in 1607 (it was only partially reconstructed); the tomb of Anna Tarnowska, carved from brown Chęciny marble in about 1616, which depicts Anna in the typical Polish sepulchral art sleeping pose; the black marble epitaph of Regina Sroczyńska, a wealthy merchant from Kraków, originally adorned with a coffin portrait of Regina painted on tin plate. Next to the sanctuary there is a chapel for St. Dominic with the most valuable element of the church's furnishing - an 18th-century wooden statue of Ecce Homo by Antoni Osiński, with profuse stucco decorations, a black marble altar and a portal.

The church contains Classical Armenian-language epitaphs of Jakub Minasowicz and his wife Medzchatun Minasowicz from the 17th century, a unique remnant of the historically significant Armenian diaspora in Poland.

== See also ==
- St. Casimir Church
- Kotowski Palace
- St. Mary's Church
- St. Florian's Cathedral
