= St. Casimir's Church, Warsaw =

Coordinates: 52°15′12″N 21°0′31″E

St. Casimir's Church
- Kościół św. Kazimierza
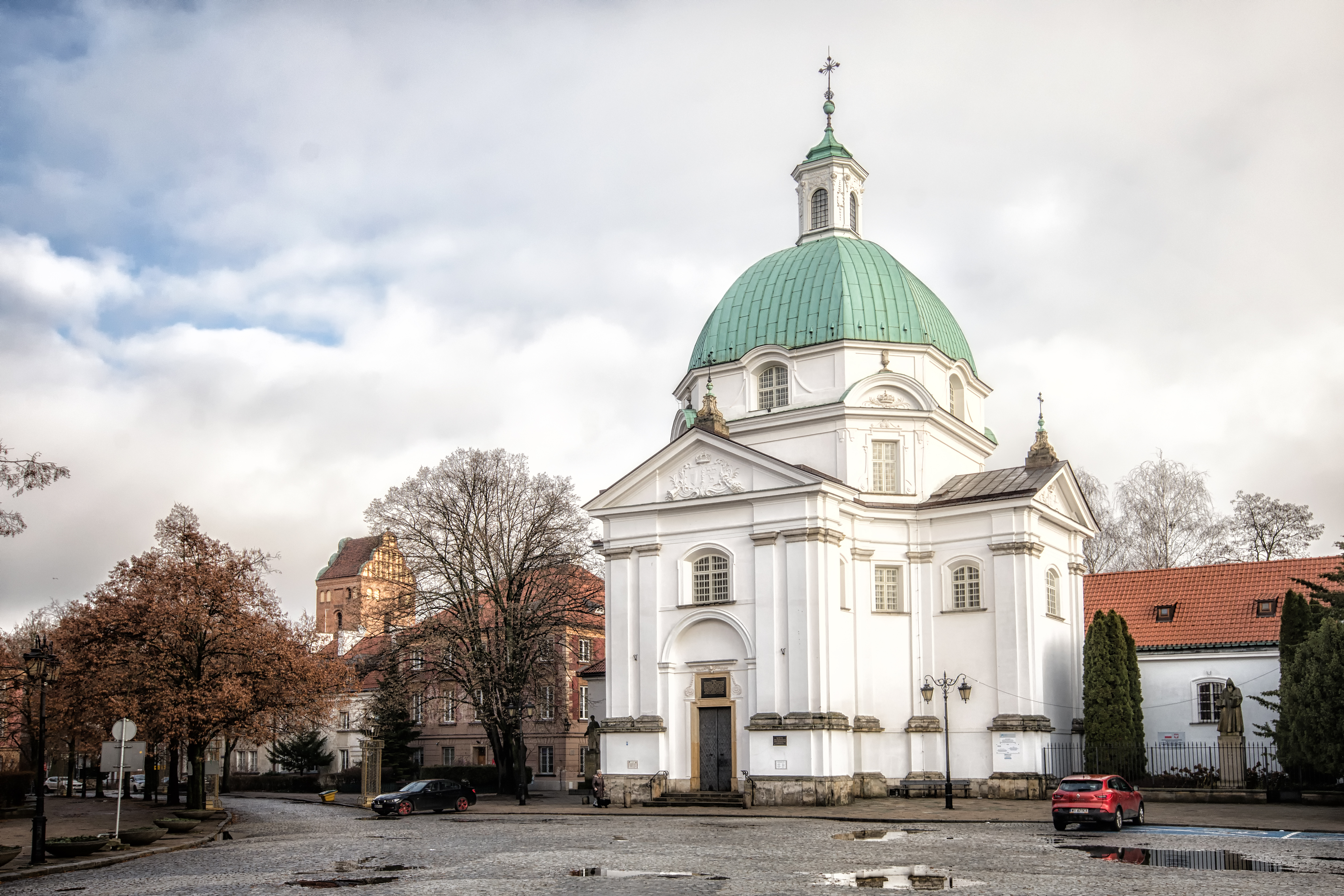
- St. Casimir's Church, reconstructed after World War II.
- St. Casimir's Church
- Country: Poland
- Denomination: Catholic

Architecture
- Functional status: Active
- Architect: Tylman van Gameren (Tylman Gamerski)
- Style: Baroque
- Groundbreaking: 1688
- Completed: 1692
- Demolished: 1944

Administration
- Archdiocese: Warsaw

Historic Monument of Poland
- Designated: 1994-09-08
- Part of: Warsaw – historic city center with the Royal Route and Wilanów
- Reference no.: M.P. 1994 nr 50 poz. 423

St. Casimir's Church (Polish: Kościół św. Kazimierza) is a Roman Catholic church in Warsaw's New Town at New Town Market Square.

== History ==
St. Casimir Church was originally the Kotowski Palace, residence of the Wyszogród stolnik, Adam Kotowski. In 1688 it was purchased by Queen Marie Casimire, the consort of John III Sobieski, to be transformed into a church to serve the Benedictine Sisters of Perpetual Adoration of the Most Holy Sacrament, whom she had brought to Poland.

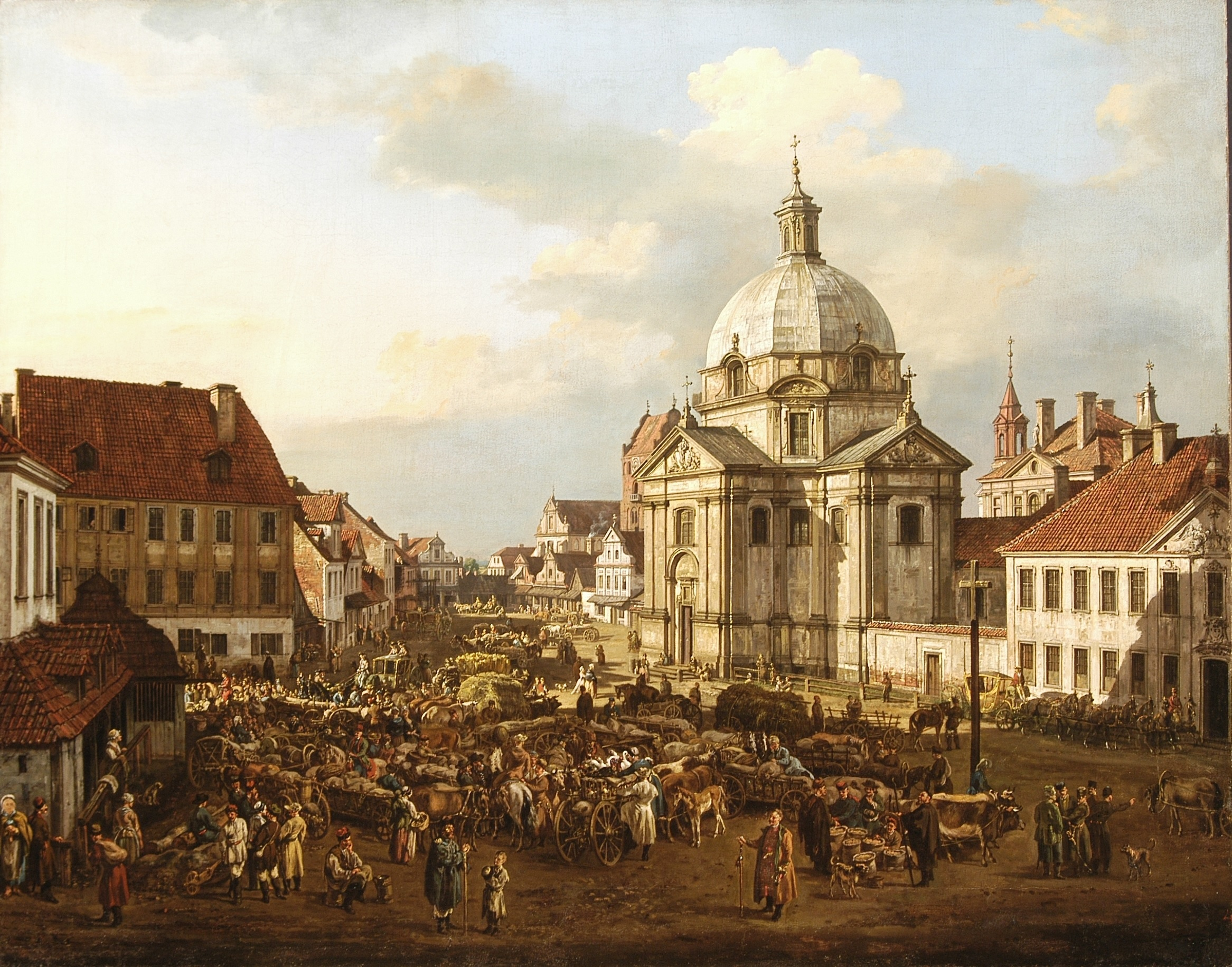
New Town Market Square with St. Casimir Church, by Canaletto, 1770.

In 1688-92 the Kotowski residence was transformed into a church-cum-cloister, to a design by the leading Dutch-born architect Tylman van Gameren (known in Polish as Tylman Gamerski). As with many of the buildings that were reconstructed after the Deluge, Tylman designed the church in Palladian style.

Between 1718 and 1721 the trompe-l'œil altars of St. Casimir and Virgin Mary were sponsored by Michał Kazimierz Radziwiłł, voivode of Vilnius. In 1718 the church furnishing was completed with a profuse late baroque pulpit in the shape of a flower and between 1745 and 1748 with a rococo organ. The significant additions in the second half of the 18th century were tombstones of the members of the Sobieski family - Maria Karolina Sobieska de Bouillon (the granddaughter of John III of Poland) and Maria Józefa Sobieska. In 1769, the former 17th century tabernacle was replaced with a new marble one decorated with silver. During the Kościuszko Uprising the nuns donated some of the church equipment to the army - 12 silver candlesticks from Augsburg, 5 gilded reliquaries, 52 precious votives and 4 statues of angels from the main altar - 412 silver grzywnas worth.

In World War II, during the Warsaw Uprising, like nearby St. Hyacinth's Church, St. Casimir was used as a hospital. The nuns housed many civilians in the church and cellars and gave medical aid as well as they could. In August 1944 they decided to suspend their rules to assist wounded insurgents. Because of this decision the German military targeted the church and the cloister for heavy bombing. During a single raid on August 31, 1944, four priests, 35 nuns and over a thousand civilians sheltering in the church's crypt were killed. Sobieska's magnificent church and cloisters was destroyed.

The church was reconstructed in 1947–53, but the Kotowski Palace was never restored.

== Interior ==
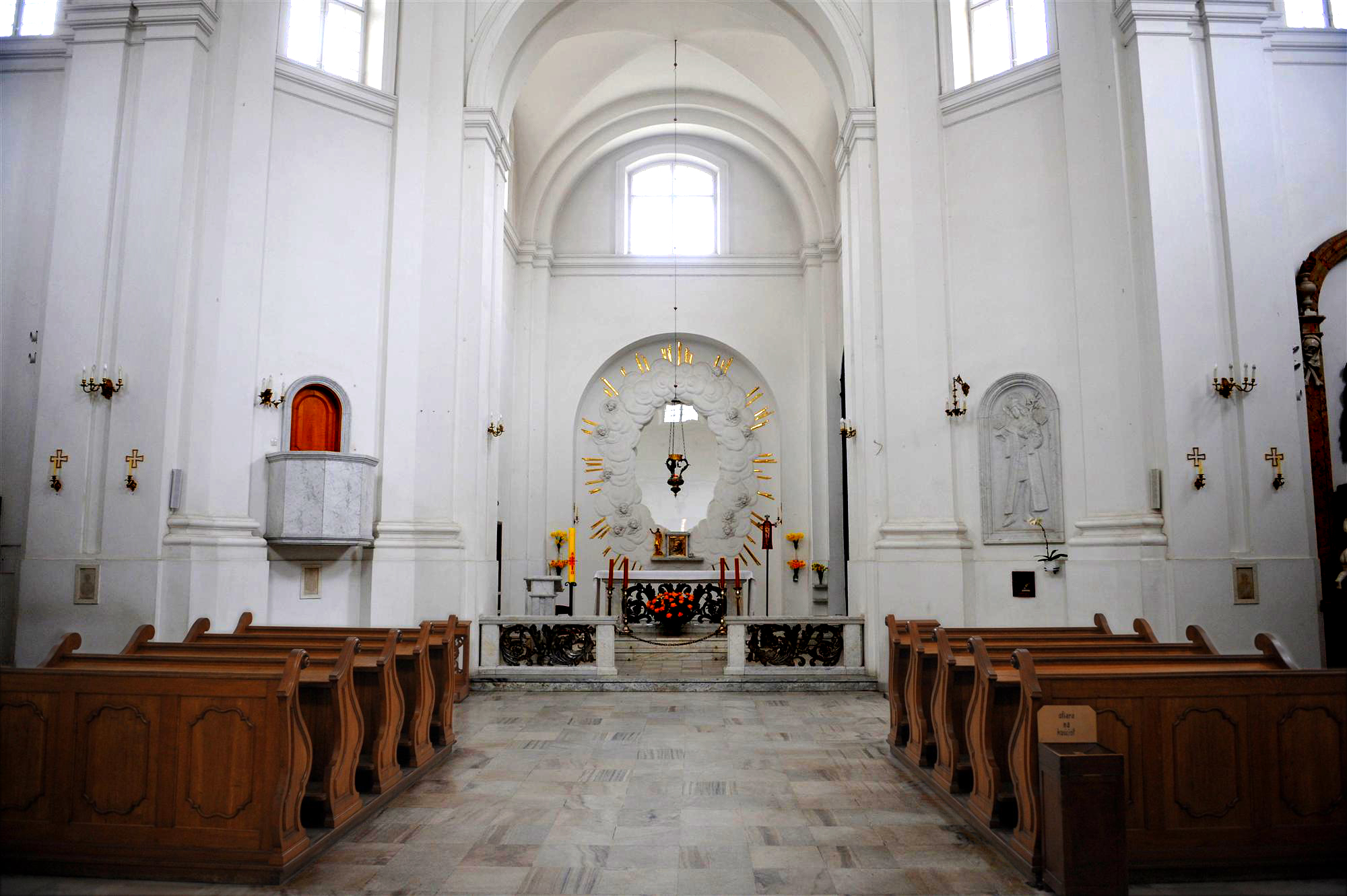
General view of interior.

Designed by Tylman Gamerski, the church consists of a large dome atop a basic Greek cross design. The facade is baroque, although the interior is completely modern, because very few of the original furnishings of the church were preserved. Inside, the most valuable element of the original church's decoration are the preserved fragments of a brilliant tomb monument of Maria Karolina Sobieska de Bouillon carved by Lorenzo Mattielli in white and black marble in 1746. The effigy of the founder in an oval frame was placed atop the plinth with the Janina coat of arms and a royal crown. The whole composition was completed with carved statues of the personification of the Polish–Lithuanian Commonwealth and a putto, while the arcade above was adorned with skulls. The tombstone was reconstructed in 1961 by Antoni Szymanowski.

== Charlotte, Duchess of Boullion's Monument ==
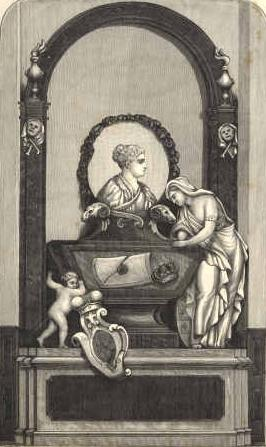
19th-century engraving

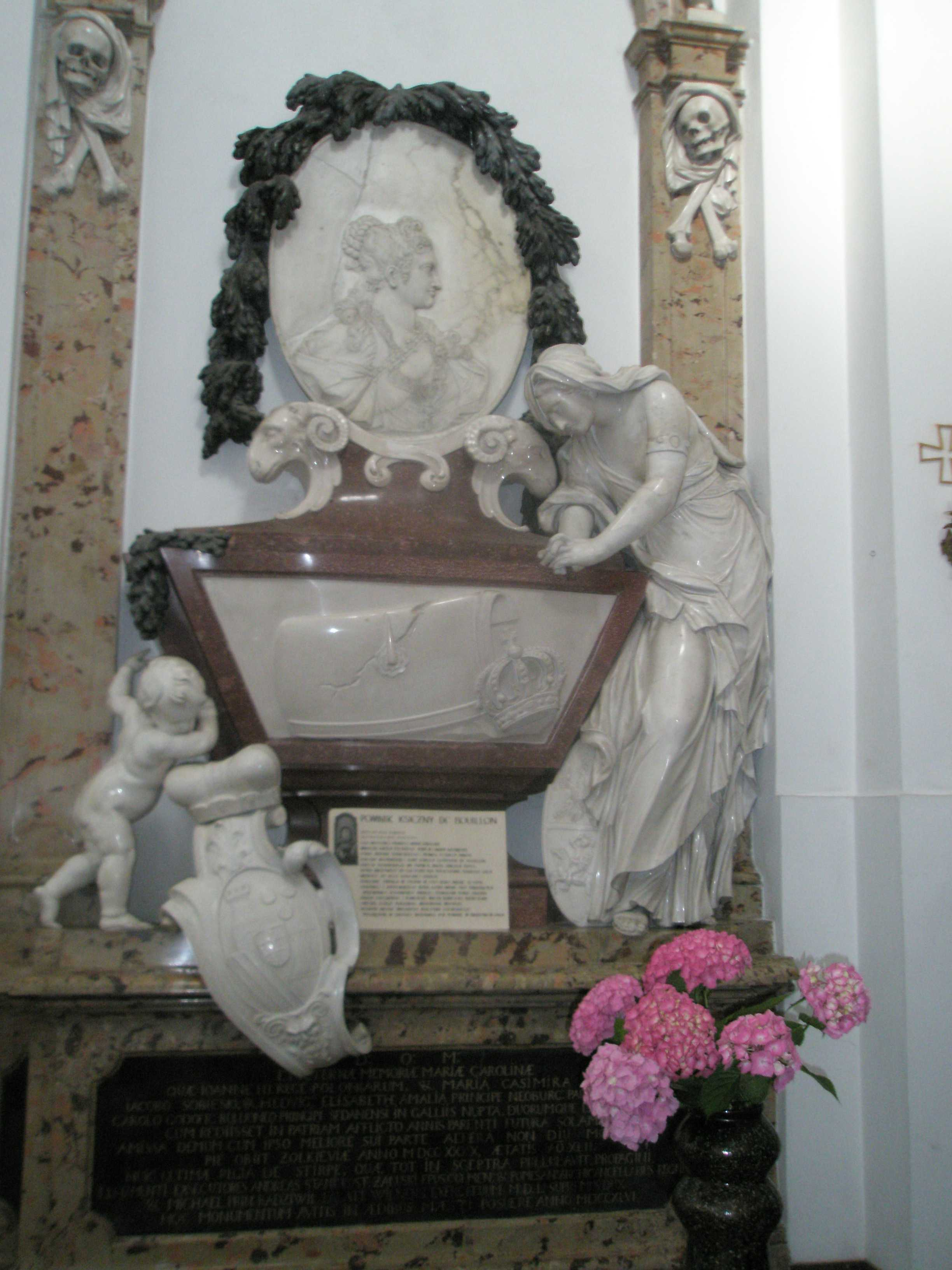
Overview

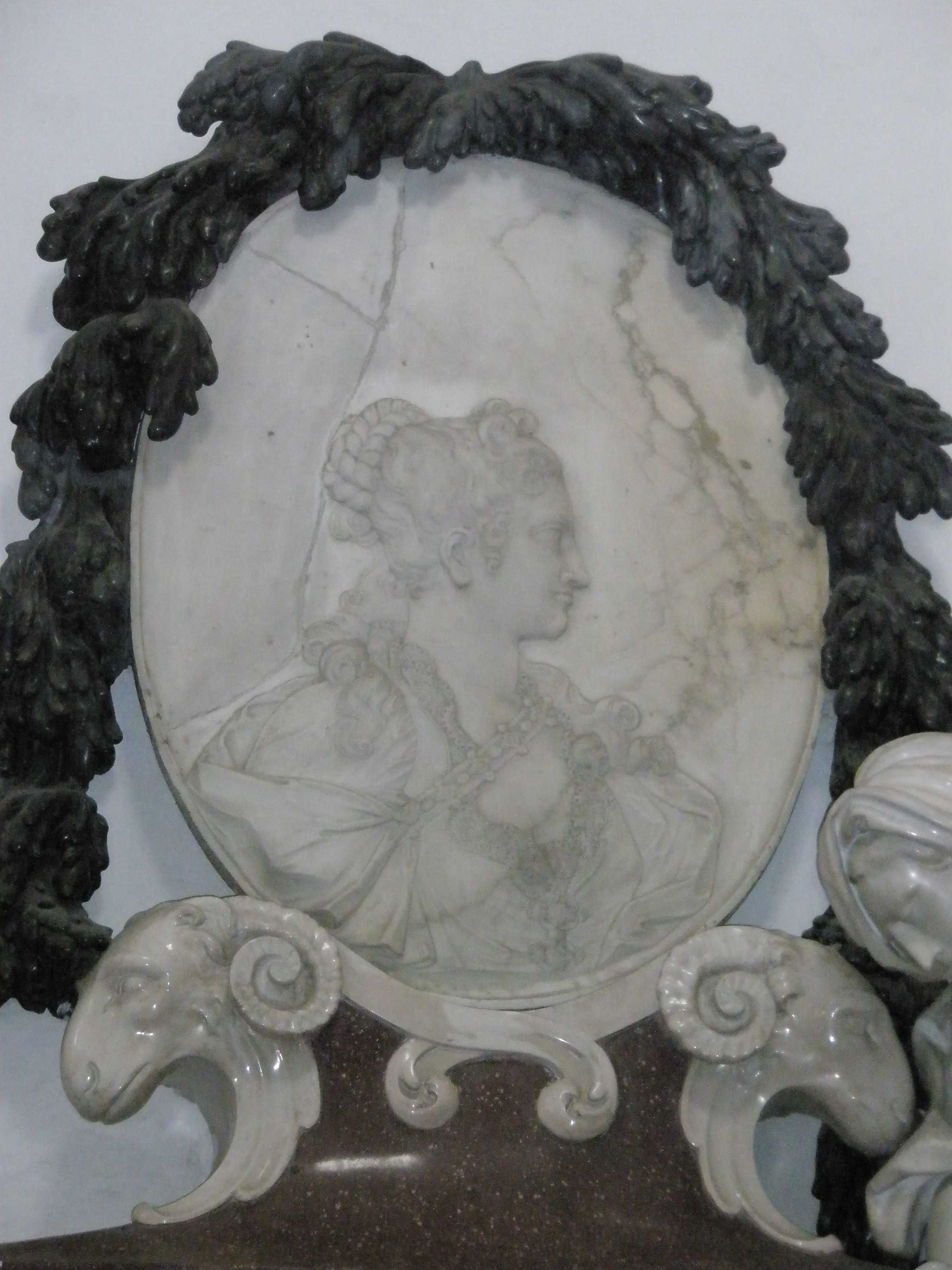
Charlotte's bust

== Photos ==
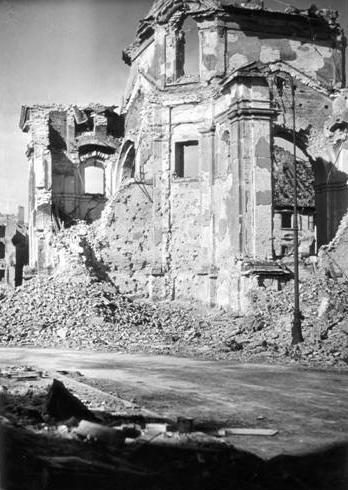
The ruins of St. Casimir Church near the end of World War II

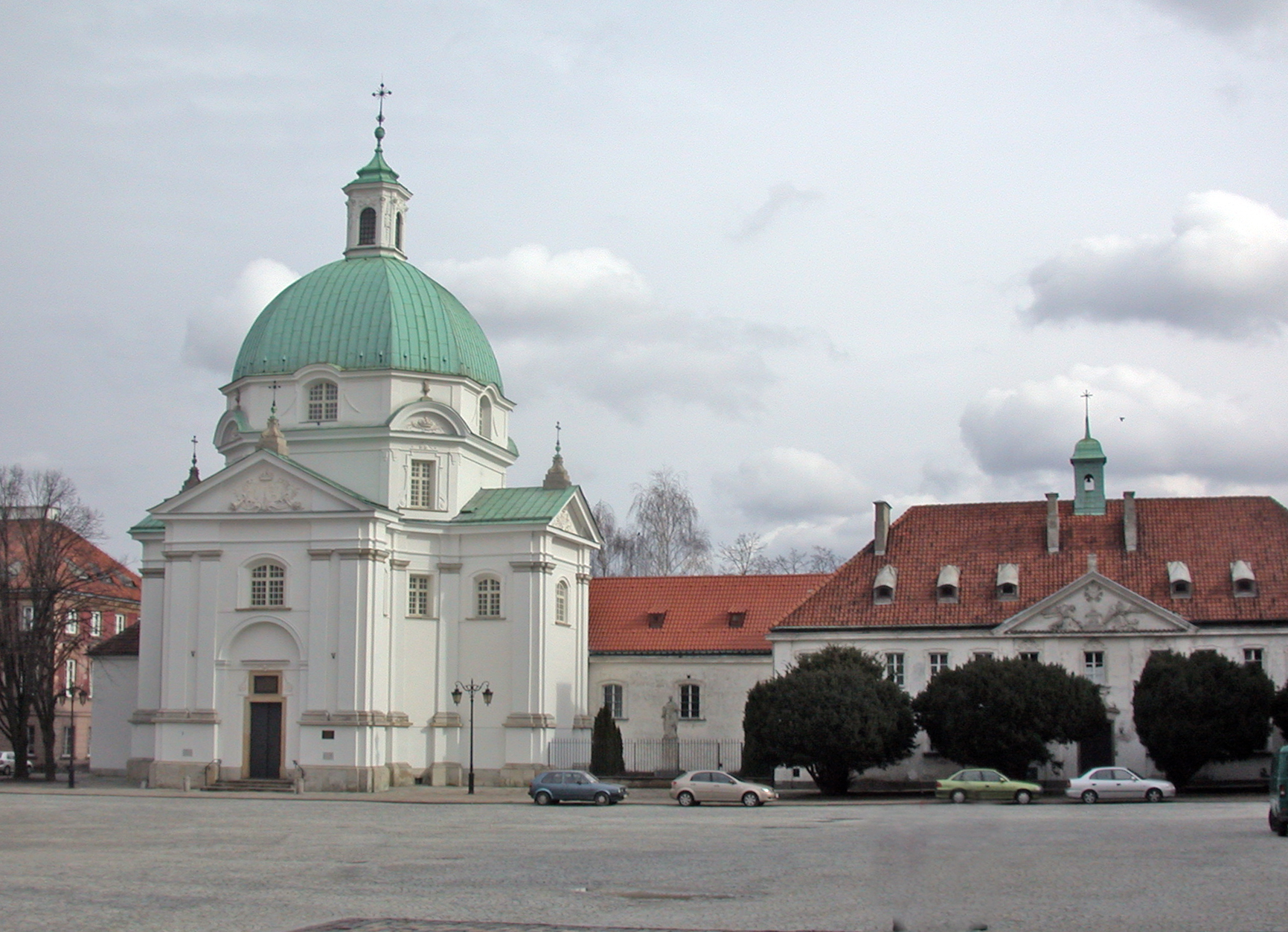
The church from the New Town square

== See also ==
- Kotowski Palace
- St. Hyacinth's Church
- St. Mary's Church
- St. Florian's Cathedral
- 17th-century Western domes
