= Sambro =

Sambro may refer to:

- Sambro (river), in Emilia-Romagna, Italy
- Sambro, Nova Scotia, a rural fishing community
- CCGS Sambro, a Canadian Coast Guard motor lifeboat

== See also ==
- Sambor (disambiguation)
- Sambro Creek, Nova Scotia, a community
- Sambro Head, Nova Scotia, a community
- Sambro Island Light, a lighthouse near Halifax, Nova Scotia
