= Stung Treng Dam =

Dam in Stung Treng, Cambodia

- Location within Cambodia
- Country: Cambodia
- Location: Stung Treng Province
- Coordinates: 13°3′31.14″N 105°59′0.42″E
- Status: Proposed
- Opening date: after 2030

Dam and spillways
- Type of dam: Earth core rockfill gravity dam
- Impounds: Mekong River
- Height: 22 m (72 ft)
- Length: 10,844 m (35,577 ft)
- Spillway capacity: 73,500 m^{3}/s (2,600,000 cu ft/s)

Reservoir
- Total capacity: 70,000,000 m^{3} (57,000 acre⋅ft)
- Surface area: 211 km^{2} (81 sq mi)

Power Station
- Hydraulic head: 15.2 m (50 ft)
- Turbines: 10 x 98 MW
- Installed capacity: 980 MW (max. planned)

The Stung Treng Dam is a proposed hydroelectric dam on the Mekong River in Stung Treng Province, Cambodia. It would be located on the mainstream of the Lower Mekong River. The project is controversial for several reasons, including its possible impact on the fisheries, as well as other ecological and environmental factors.

== History ==
In 2007, the Russian company Bureyagesstroy, a subsidiary of RusHydro, received a license to conduct a feasibility study on a dam. The feasibility study was carried out and the company asked permission to build the hydroelectric power station. However, on December 9, 2009, a memorandum of understanding was signed between the Cambodian Government and the Vietnam Industrial and Urban Area Investment Development Corp (IDICO) to conduct a new feasibility study on the dam. The results of this survey have not been released.

In March 2020, due to ecological concerns, the Cambodian government halted all hydroelectric developments on the Mekong River until 2030, pushing back the Stung Treng dam project along with its neighbour the Sambor Dam project.

Despite the ban, The Royal Group conglomerate received permission from the Ministry of Mines and Energy to conduct feasibility studies for the dam at three potential sites in 2022.

== Description ==
The Stung Treng Dam would be an earth core rock-fill gravity dam. If completed, the dam's crest would be 10,844 metres (35,577 ft) long and 22 metres (72 ft) high. Its rated head would be 15.2 metres (50 ft). It would have an installed capacity of 980 MW, and would, on average, generate 4,870 GWh per year. The dam's reservoir, which would extend well beyond the mainstream canal, would have an active storage of 70,000,000 cubic metres (57,000 acre⋅ft), and would inundate an area of 211 square kilometres (81 sq mi). The reservoir would be 50 kilometres (31 mi) long.

== Impact ==
Multiple independent agencies, including International Rivers, the Save the Mekong campaign and others have raised concerns about the dam's construction. In addition, Cambodia is a member of the Mekong River Commission, which requires prior notification of hydropower construction on the river's mainstream – i.e. plans for the Stung Treng will be subject to scrutiny by Laos, Thailand and Vietnam. A report authorized by the Mekong River Commission and released in January 2010 recommended that the Stung Treng along with the Sambor Dam be delayed for 10 years. A 2012 study by the Ministry of Agriculture, Forestry and Fisheries's Inland Fisheries Research and Development Institute found that the Stung Treng dam would reduce yields of fish and other aquatic animals by 6% to 24%.

The dam site lies within the Stung Treng Ramsar Site, which effectively obliges the Royal Cambodian Government to ‘actively support' the three 'pillars' of the Ramsar Convention:

- ensuring the conservation and wise use of wetlands it has designated as Wetlands of International Importance,
- including as far as possible the wise use of all wetlands in national environmental planning,
- consulting with other Parties about implementation of the Convention, especially in regard to transboundary wetlands, shared water systems, and shared species.

It is expected that fish migration routes (which support the world's largest inland fishery on the Tonlé Sap) will be essentially wholly impeded. The two proposed dams of the Sambor and the Stung Treng would have the Mekong river basin's highest sediment trapping efficiencies of all the Lower Mekong Basin's proposed mainstream projects, destabilizing downstream channels between Kratié and Phnom Penh and reducing over bank siltation in the Cambodian floodplain.

If built, an estimated 21 villages with 2,059 households and 10,617 people will be displaced with the construction of the dam.

== See also ==
- Lower Se San 2 Dam
