= New Town Market Square (Warsaw) =

Square in Warsaw, Poland

Coordinates: 52°15′10″N 21°0′29″E

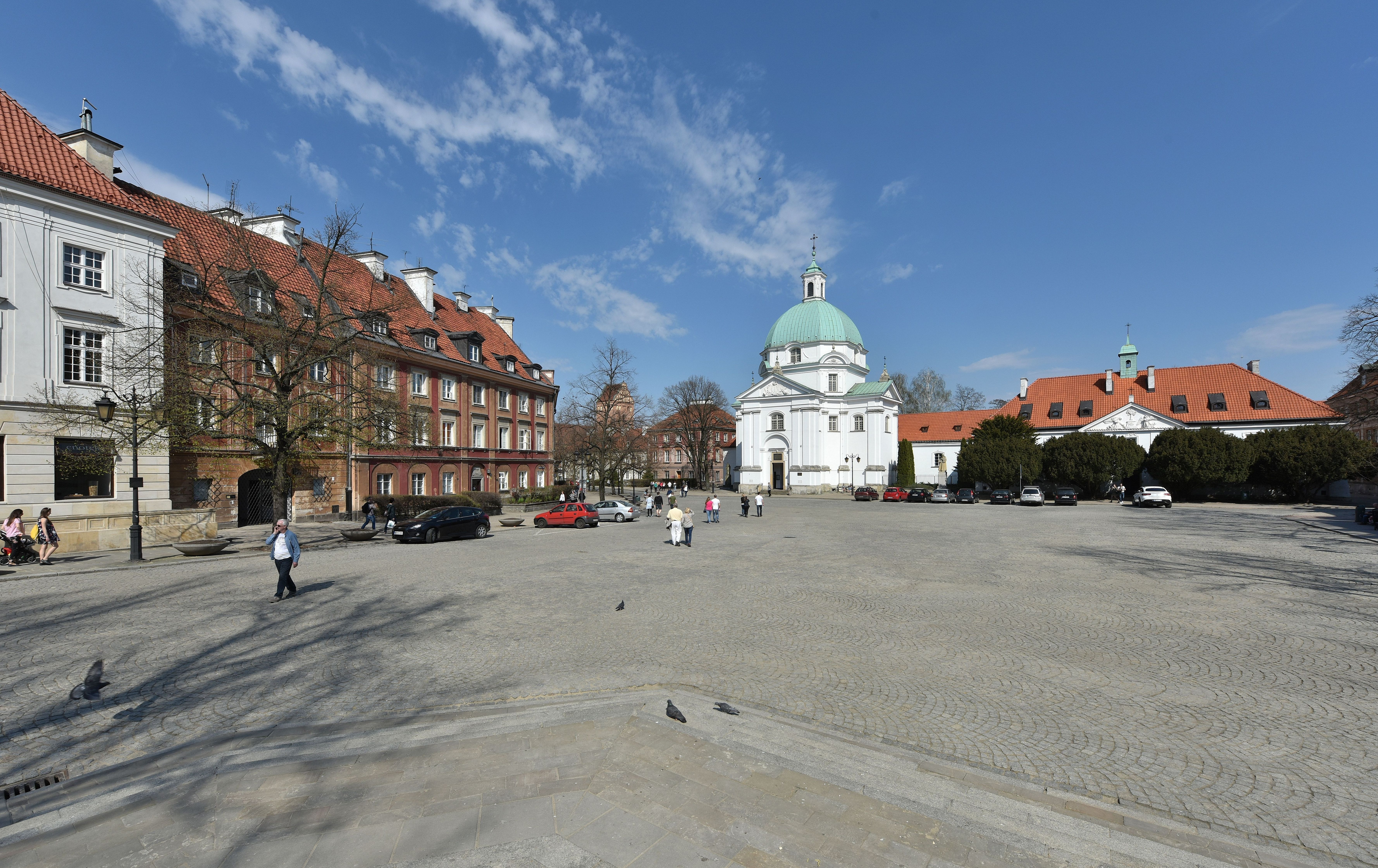
New Town Market Square with Saint Kazimierz Church, 2017

New Town Market Square (Polish: Rynek Nowego Miasta) is the main square of the New Town of Warsaw, Poland.

== History ==
It was formed before 1408, as the main square of the Warsaw New Town. It initially had a rectangular shape, with an area of 140 x 120 meters. In the 15th century, a wooden town hall was built in the center of the square and residential buildings were also constructed. In 1544 the square was damaged by fire, and the town hall was reconstructed in brick. The rest of the buildings remained wooden.

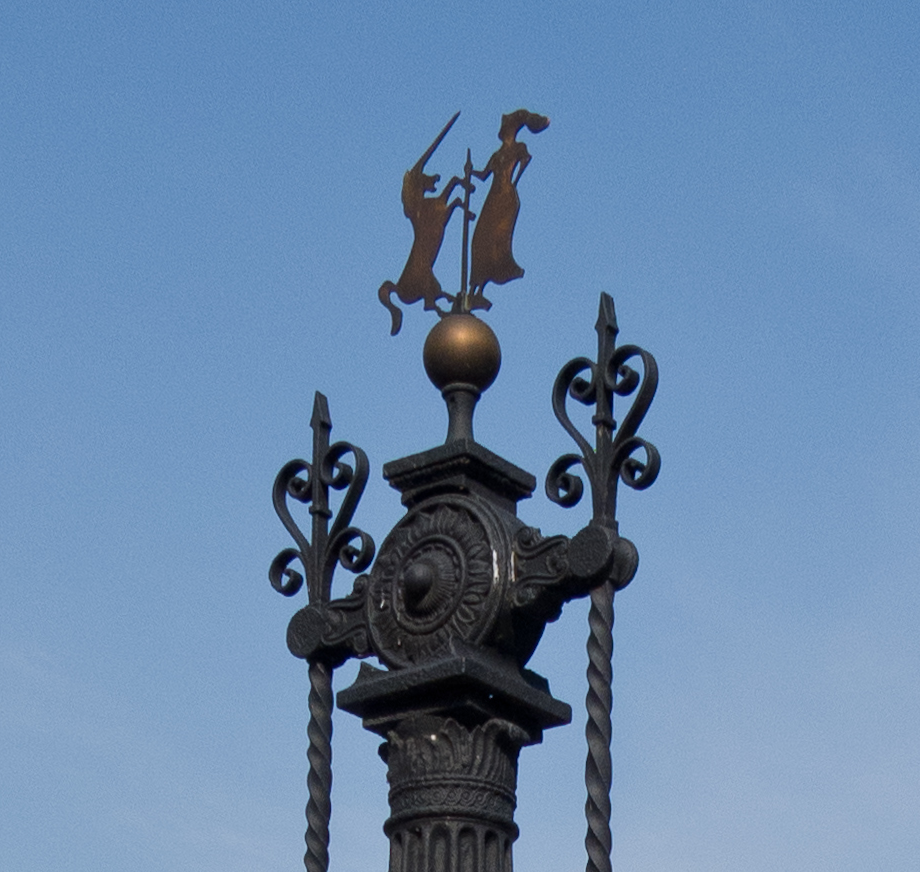
Well featuring a girl with a unicorn

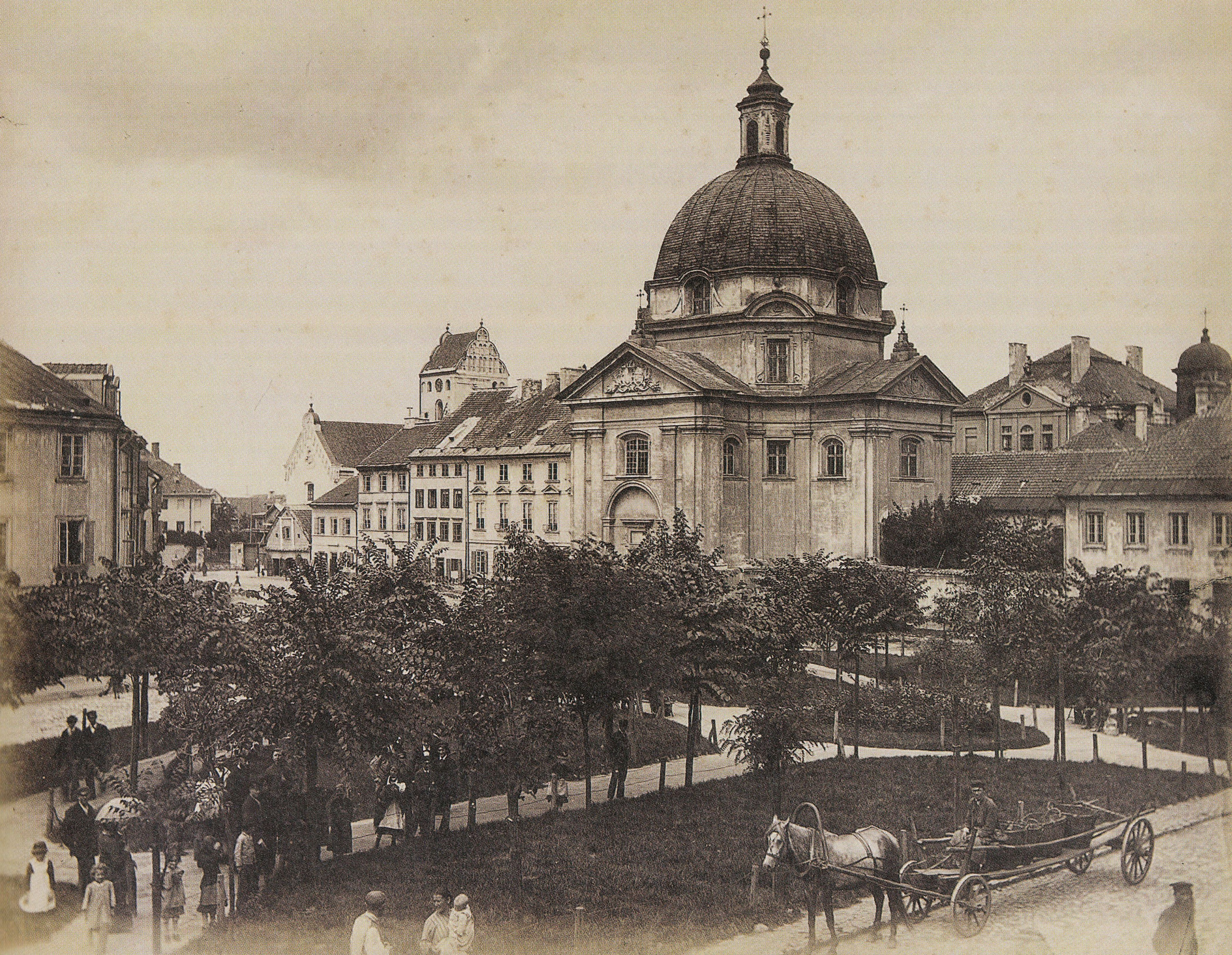
The square in 1885

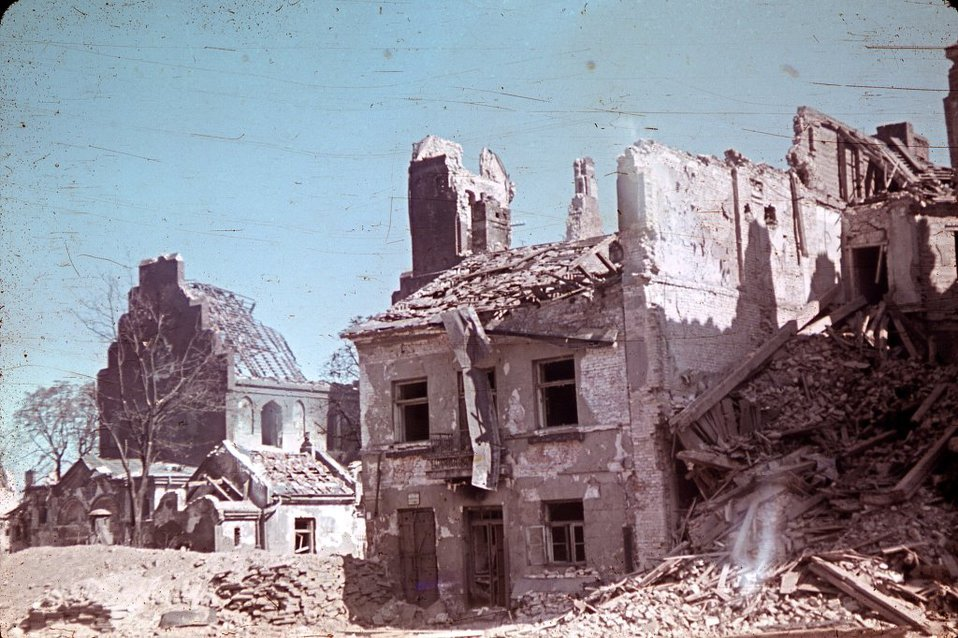
The square in 1944

In 1656 the square was burned down by Swedes, during the Deluge. The reconstruction was slow, and the town hall was rebuilt again in 1680. In 1688 the Baroque Saint Kazimierz Church was built by Dutch architect Tylman van Gameren. In the second half of the 18th century, wooden residential buildings were replaced by bricked tenement houses. In 1785, the town hall was partially reconstructed and several shops were added to it. In 1818 the town hall was torn down, and the square gained its market character, which continued until 1878. Then, the buildings on the square were expanded and reconstructed to house growing number of craftsmen and workers. In 1932 a statue of Saint Klemens Hofbauer was placed in the square.

In World War II, during the Warsaw Uprising of 1944, the square was completely destroyed, 80% of houses were completely demolished, including the church. After the war, the square was reconstructed in the 18th-century style. The reconstruction lasted until 1955.

A 19th century well is located in the southern part of the square. The image of a girl with a unicorn, old symbol of the New Town, can be found on the top of its eclectic cast-iron pump.

== See also ==
- Old Town Market Place, Warsaw
