= Church of the Visitation of the Blessed Virgin Mary, Warsaw =

Church in Warsaw, Poland

Coordinates: 52°15′15″N 21°0′33″E

Church of the Visitation of the Blessed Virgin Mary Kościół Nawiedzenia Najświętszej Marii Panny (in Polish)
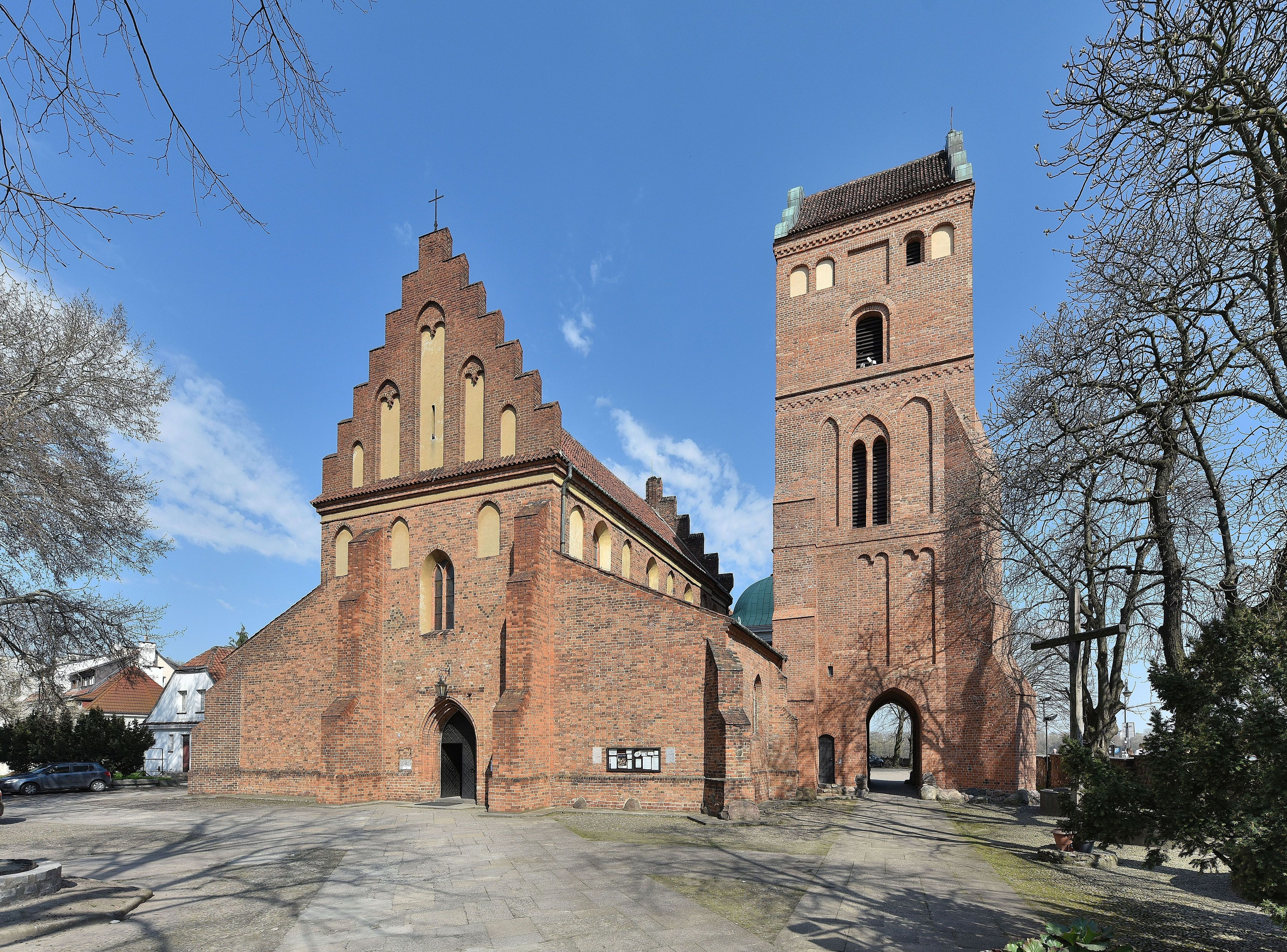
- Church of the Visitation, Warsaw
- Interactive map of the Church of the Visitation of the Blessed Virgin Mary; Kościół Nawiedzenia Najświętszej Marii Panny (in Polish) area

General information
- Architectural style: Brick Gothic
- Location: Warsaw, Poland
- Construction started: 1409
- Completed: 1411
- Demolished: 1944 (rebuilt 1947–1966)
- Client: Janusz I the Old

Historic Monument of Poland
- Designated: 1994-09-08
- Part of: Warsaw – historic city center with the Royal Route and Wilanów
- Reference no.: M.P. 1994 nr 50 poz. 423

The Church of the Visitation of the Most Blessed Virgin Mary (Polish: Kościół Nawiedzenia Najświętszej Marii Panny), otherwise known as St. Mary's Church (Kościół Mariacki) is a church in Warsaw, Poland. It is one of oldest buildings and one of the few surviving examples of Gothic architecture in the city. It is located at ulica Przyrynek 2.

== History ==
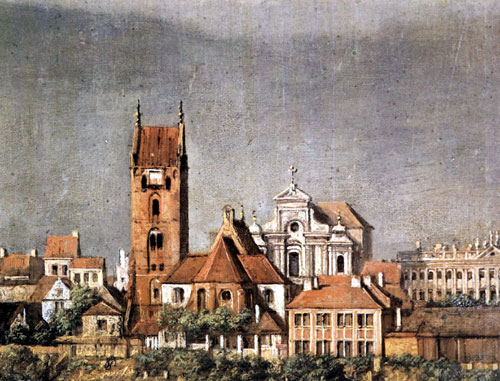
St. Mary's Church, painting by Bernardo Bellotto, 1770.

St. Mary's Church stands on the site of an ancient pagan place of worship. The church's foundation stone was laid by Janusz I the Old, Duke of Masovia and his wife, Danutė of Lithuania, in 1409. The church was consecrated in 1411. It has been modified, demolished and rebuilt several times. Originally it had one nave, was made of bricks, had a ceiling and an arch presbytery, before the end of the 15th century it was transformed into a three nave basilica.

The church's most striking characteristic is the tower, built in 1518. It is recognizable from a great distance and is depicted in the oldest images of Warsaw.

During World War II, the church was severely damaged by German forces - the roof of the nave collapsed and the upper portion of the tower was blown up. It was reconstructed in 1947–1966 to the design by Beata Trylińska.

Behind the church is small park with a set of steps that lead down to the Vistula and the so named Kościuszko banks of the river. In the square there are outdoor theatre performances and concerts which are organized locally.

== See also ==
- St. Kazimierz Church
- St. Hyacinth's Church
- St. John's Cathedral
- St. Martin's Church
