= Sambor Dam =

Dam in Kratie, Cambodia

- Location within Cambodia
- Country: Cambodia
- Location: Prek Kampi District, Kratie Province
- Coordinates: 12°47′N 105°57′E
- Status: Proposed
- Opening date: after 2030
- Construction cost: US $4.947 billion

Dam and spillways
- Type of dam: concrete gravity earth core rockfill
- Impounds: Mekong River
- Height: 56 m (184 ft)
- Length: 18,002 m (59,062 ft)
- Spillway capacity: 17,668 m^{3}/s (623,900 cu ft/s)

Reservoir
- Creates: Sambor Hydropower Dam Reservoir
- Total capacity: 3.794 km^{3} (3,076,000 acre⋅ft)
- Surface area: 620 km^{2} (240 sq mi)

Power Station
- Hydraulic head: 16.5 m (54 ft)
- Turbines: 40 x 65 MW (87,000 hp)
- Installed capacity: 2,600 MW (3,500,000 hp) (max. planned)
- Annual generation: 11,740 GWh (42,300 TJ)

The Sambor Dam is a proposed dam and hydroelectric power station on the Mekong River south of Sambor village in Prek Kampi District, Kratie Province, Cambodia. If built, it would be the lowest dam of the Mekong's mainstream dams, and largest in Cambodia.

The Cambodian Government sees the dam as an important potential source of income and if the dam is constructed, expects to sell 70% of the power generated to Vietnam and 10% to Thailand. The balance would be directed to domestic energy markets. The dam's construction is opposed by several non-governmental organizations and civil society groups.

== History ==
The Sambor Dam was first proposed in the 1950s. In 1994, the Mekong Secretariat proposed in its report construction of the 3,300 megawatts (4,400,000 hp) hydroelectric structure blocking the entire river. In October 2006, the China Southern Power Grid Company signed a memorandum of understanding with Cambodia's Ministry of Industry, Mines and Energy at the Greater Mekong Subregion Expo in Nanning, China, to carry out a new feasibility study for the proposed dam with power generation capacity of 2,600 megawatts (3,500,000 hp) and for the alternative option of 465 megawatts (624,000 hp). The company also undertook a geological study of the site. In 2011, CSG withdrew from the project, saying that it was "a responsible company". In October 2016, Cambodia's Royal Group was authorised by the Cambodian Council of Ministers to sign a memorandum of understanding with the Cambodian Ministry of Mines and Energy to “thoroughly conduct” pre-feasibility, feasibility and social and environmental impact studies for three proposed dams: the Stung Treng, the Sekong (or Xekong) and the Sambor.

In March 2020, due to ecological concerns, the Cambodian government halted all hydroelectric developments on the Mekong River until 2030, pushing back the Sambor dam project along with its neighbor the Stung Treng dam project.

== Description ==
There are two options for the dam. In the case of the first option, the dam will extend across the Mekong mainstream blocking the entire river flow. It would be a combination of a concrete gravity dam and an earth rockfill dam with a length of 18,002 metres (59,062 ft) and height of 56 metres (184 ft). If built according to these plans, the dam would have an installed power capacity of 2,600 MW. Its reservoir would be 620 square kilometres (240 sq mi) with an active storage of 0.463 cubic kilometres (375,000 acre⋅ft). This version of the project would cost US$4.947 billion. Associated transmission lines would cost a further US$312.9 million.

An alternative smaller version of the dam would have a capacity of 465 MW. It would block only part of the river. A 2-metre (6 ft 7 in) high weir across the Mekong would divert water into a 20-kilometre (12 mi) long, 350-metre (1,150 ft) wide, 30-metre (98 ft) high canal running along the river bank. It would create a reservoir with surface area of 6 square kilometres (2.3 sq mi). This version would cost US$700 million.

70% of the power it would generate would be destined for Vietnam, while the balance would be intended for domestic Cambodian markets. Sambor is given third priority ranking. Reportedly, both the French government and the World Bank are considering funding the pre-feasibility study for Sambor. The dam's earliest potential commissioning date is 2020.

== Impact ==
Like other dams planned for the Mekong, the Sambor Dam has given rise to numerous social and environmental concerns from organizations including TERRA, International Rivers, WWF, and Save the Mekong about the potential impacts of the Sambor Hydropower Plant. It is expected that the dam will have significant negative impacts on the Mekong's fisheries, its hydrology and regional and national economies

According to the study of 1969, an estimated 5,120 people would be displaced by the project. Later studies give an estimate of 19,034 people.

An evaluation of potential impacts of mainstream hydropower dams on Mekong fisheries, published by the Mekong River Commission in 1994, noted that the Sambor project would block upstream and downstream fish migration. Given that the Tonle Sap fisheries are of vital importance to the Cambodian people and economy, contributing approximately 60% towards Cambodia's annual fish landings, the Sambor and other planned mainstream dams on the Mekong have important implications for the country. A recent policy brief by the WorldFish Center and the Cambodian National Mekong Committee points to the serious impacts dams could have on Cambodia's fisheries and on the fisheries in Laos, Thailand, and Vietnam as a result of reduced river flows, and the 'flattening out' of the river's flood pulse.

The dam also poses threats to the Irrawaddy dolphin.

== See also ==
- Mekong River Basin Hydropower
