= Sambor, Altai Krai =

Sambor Самбор
- Selo
- Location within Altai Krai Location within Russia
- Coordinates: 52°46′N 78°53′E
- Country: Russia
- Region: Altai Krai
- District: Tabunsky District
- Time zone: UTC+7:00

Sambor (Russian: Самбор) is a rural locality (a selo) in Tabunsky Selsoviet, Tabunsky District, Altai Krai, Russia. The population was 268 as of 2013. There are 3 streets.

== Geography ==
Sambor is located 8 km east of Tabuny (the district's administrative centre) by road. Udalnoye is the nearest rural locality.
