= Samborska Street =

Street in Warsaw, Poland

Coordinates: 52.25506°N 21.00831°E

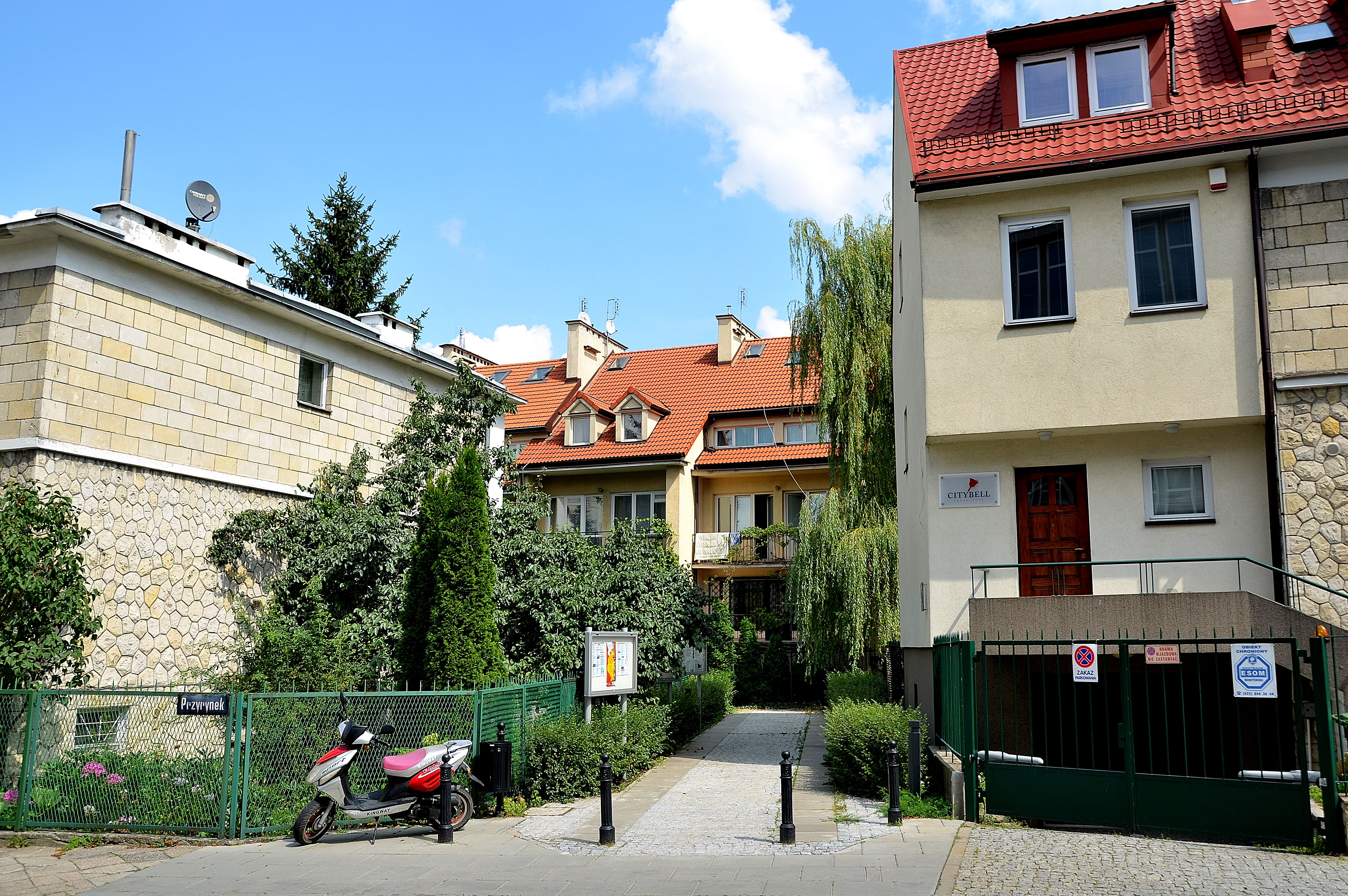
Samborska Street, post renovation

Samborska Street (Polish: ulica Samborska) is the shortest street in Warsaw and possibly in Poland.

Approximately 22 metres (72 ft) long, it is located in Warsaw's New Town, just off Przyrynek Street near the Polish Security Printing Works building. It was laid out in 1770 or 1771. Its name comes from the Polish family name Samborski, who were Warsaw residents and, at the time, owners of the surrounding land.

No buildings are assigned to the street. For many years it was almost invisible, overgrown and closed. In 2010 it was renovated and opened to pedestrians, becoming a minor tourist attractions.
