= Kotowski Palace =

Palace and cloister

Coordinates: 52°15′12″N 21°00′33″E

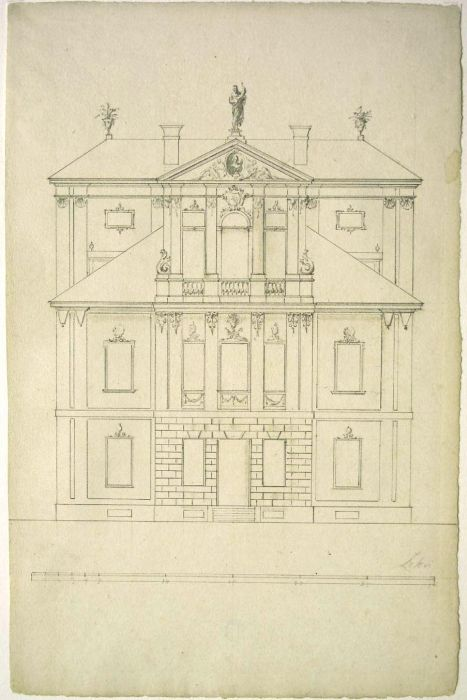
- Kotowski Palace: design by Tylman van Gameren
- Interactive map of the Kotowski Palace area

General information
- Architectural style: Baroque
- Location: Warsaw, Poland
- Construction started: 1682
- Completed: 1684
- Demolished: 1944
- Client: Adam Kotowski

Design and construction
- Architect: Tylman van Gameren

The Kotowski Palace (Polish: Pałac Kotowskich) was a 17th-century palace in Warsaw, Poland. It served as the main cloister building for the Benedictine Sisters of Perpetual Adoration.

== History ==
The palace was built some time between 1682 and 1684 for Adam Kotowski, the royal cup-bearer at King Jan Sobieski's court, and his wife Małgorzata Durant. This large, three-storied Baroque building in Palladian style was designed by Tylman van Gameren. In 1688, it was purchased by Queen Maria Kazimiera and transferred to the Benedictines of the Blessed Sacrament. From 1688 till 1692, the Kotowski residence was transformed into a church-cum-cloister by Tylman van Gameren. In the 18th century the monastery was enlarged. Around 1745, a new palace was built on the New Town Market Square and from 1754 to 1777, it was occupied by the Jesuit Collegium Nobilium. Between 1771 and 1779, King Stanisław August Poniatowski established a new building situated on the rear escarpment. Those two buildings were connected in 1788.

During the Second World War, the building was used as a hospital. This made it a frequent target for bombing by the Germans in the Warsaw Uprising. The palace was completely destroyed by them afterwards and was never reconstructed.

== See also ==
- Saint Casimir's Church
- Brühl Palace

== Gallery ==
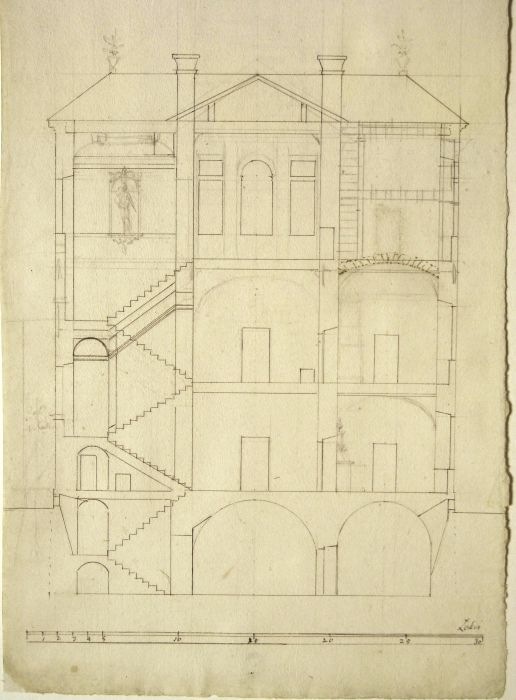
Kotowski Palace: interior design

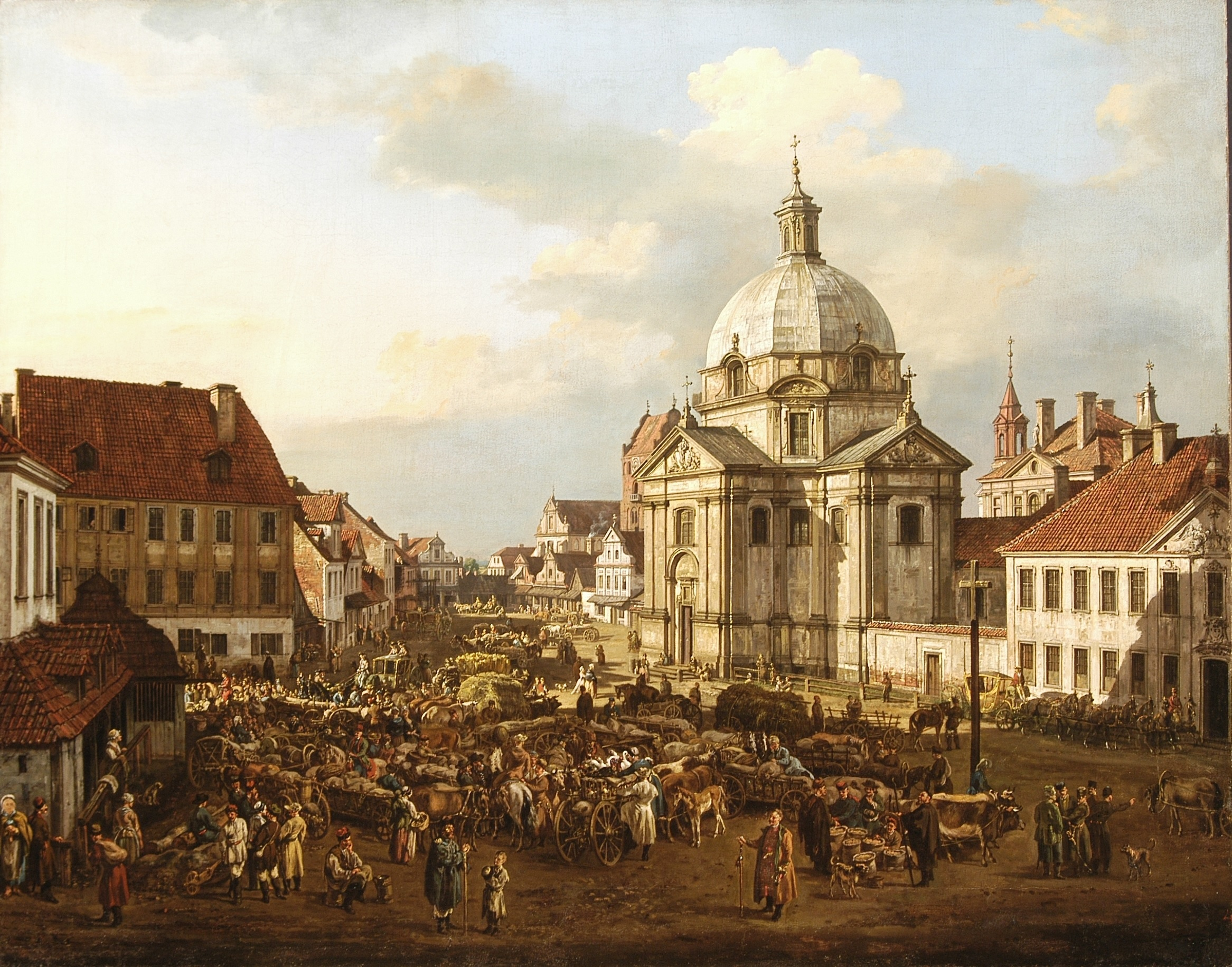
Cloister: painting by Bernardo Bellotto
