= Old Warsaw Town Hall =

Demolished town hall in Warsaw

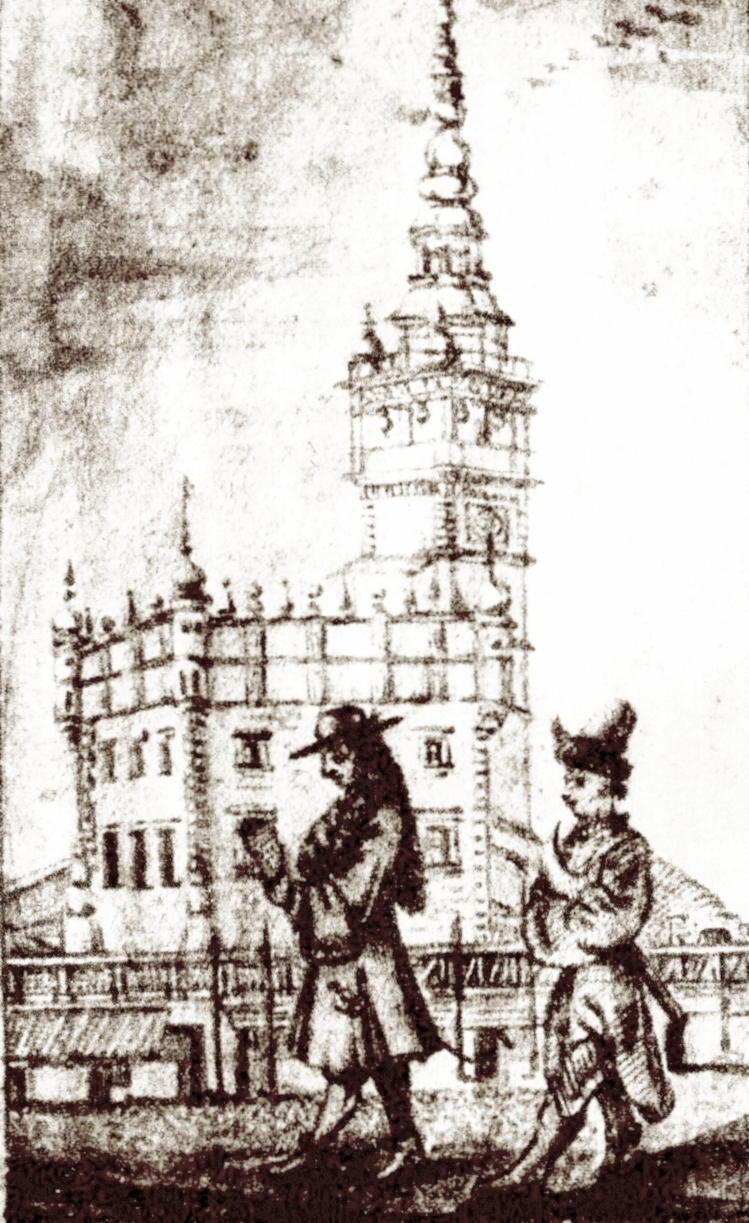
Old Town Hall in 1701

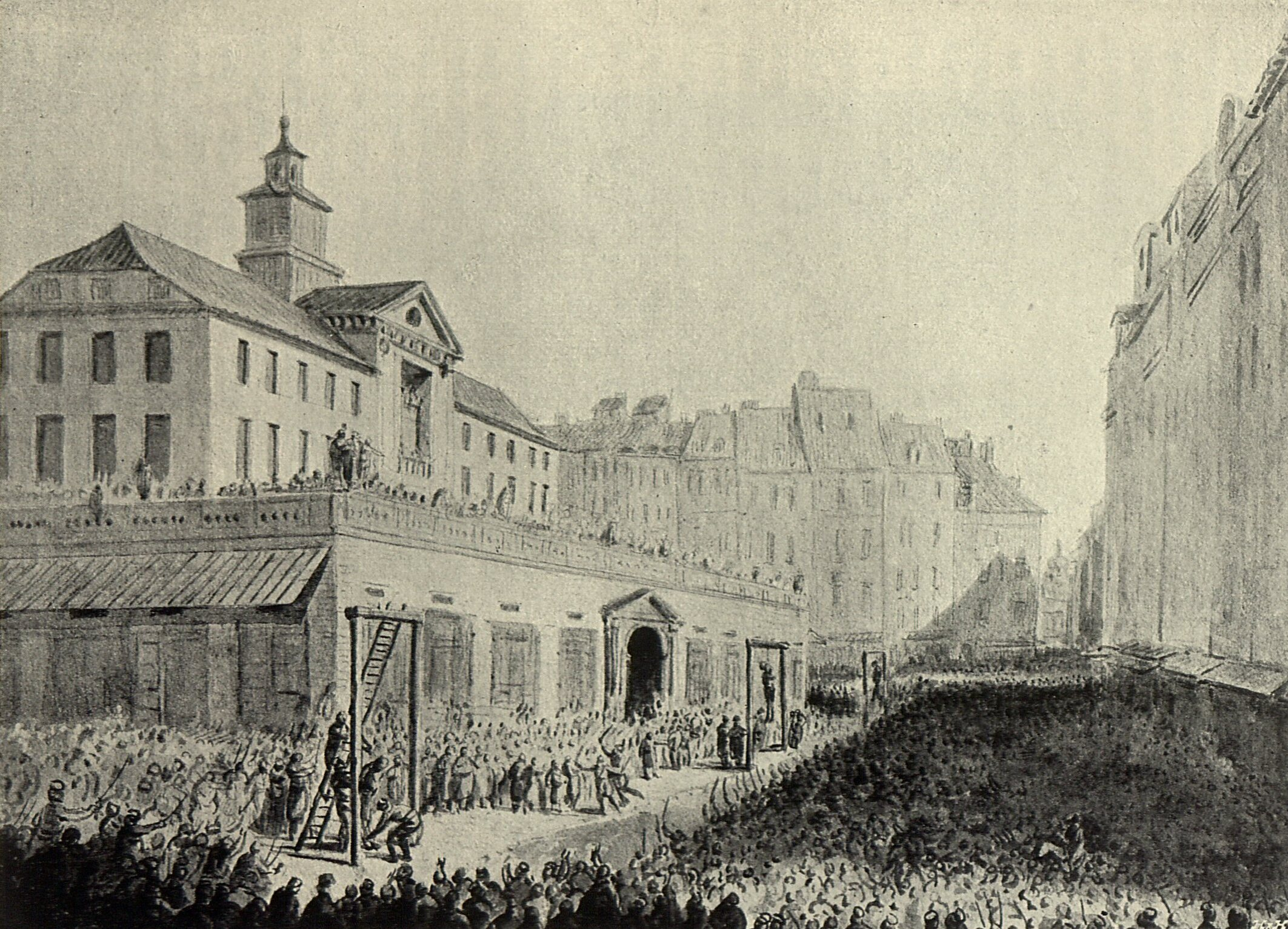
Jan Piotr Norblin, Hanging on the Old Town Market Square on May 9, 1794, the town hall on the left side

The Old Warsaw Town Hall (Polish: Ratusz Starej Warszawy), also known as the Old Town Hall (Polish: Ratusz Starego Miasta) was a town hall in Old Warsaw which was built before 1429 and demolished in 1817. It was situated in the middle of the Old Town Market Square in Warsaw.
