= Statue of Maria Skłodowska-Curie (Ochota) =

Monument in Warsaw, Poland

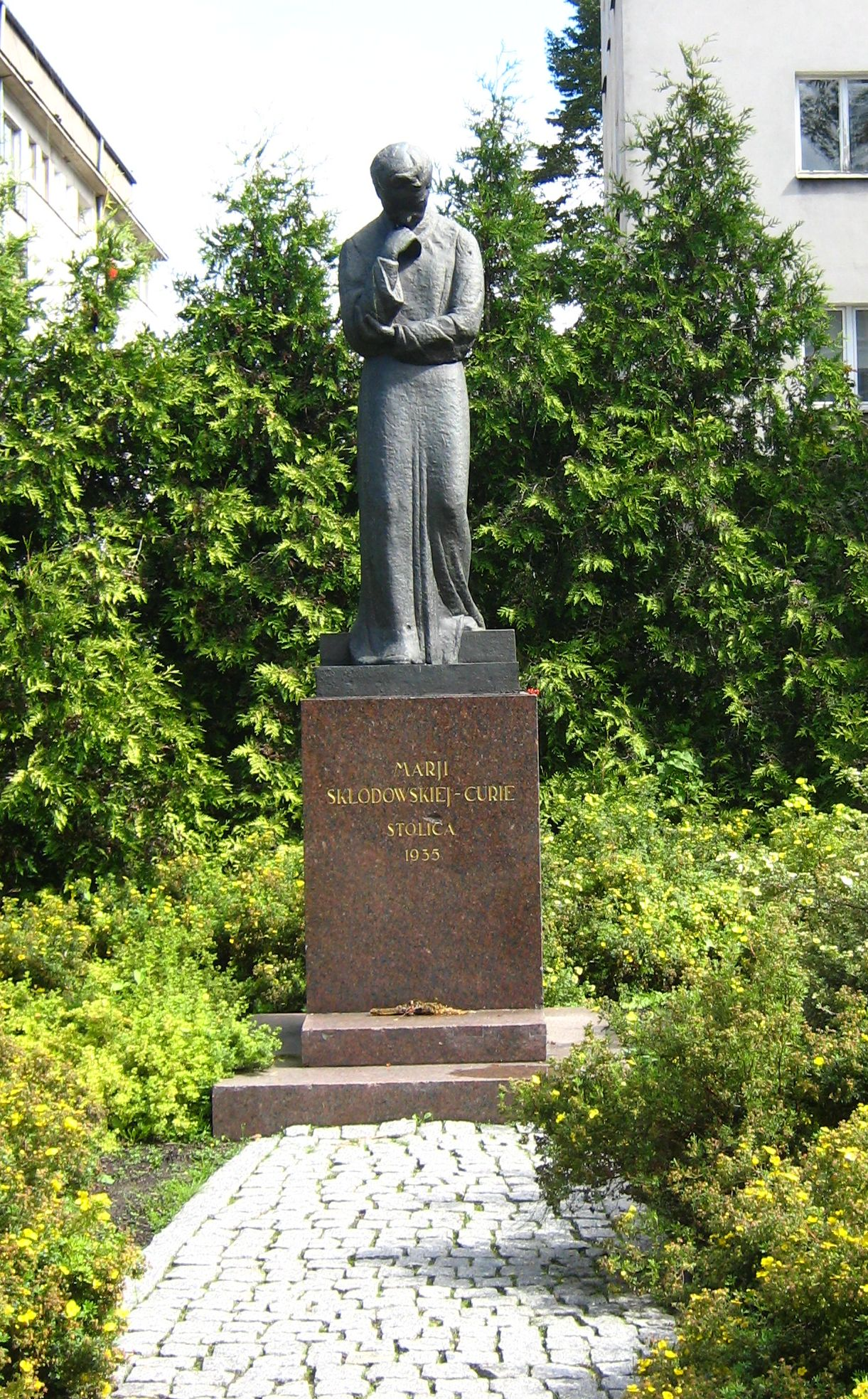
- The monument in 2010.
- Interactive map of Statue of Maria Skłodowska-Curie
- Location: Warsaw, Poland
- Coordinates: 52°12′56.84″N 20°59′04.78″E
- Designer: Ludwika Nitschowa
- Type: Statue
- Material: Bronze
- Height: 3 m (9.8 ft)
- Opening date: 5 September 1935
- Dedicated to: Maria Skłodowska-Curie

The statue of Maria Skłodowska-Curie (Note: Polish pronunciation: [ˈma.rja skwɔˈdɔf.ska kiˈri]; French pronunciation: [ˈkjʊəri]) (Polish: Pomnik Marii Skłodowskiej-Curie) is a bronze statue in Warsaw, Poland, located in the Skłodowska-Curie Park at the intersection Wawelska and Skłodowskiej-Curie Streets, and near the Maria Skłodowska-Curie National Research Institute of Oncology, within the district of Ochota. It is dedicated to Maria Skłodowska-Curie, a 19th- and 20th-century physicist and chemist who conducted pioneering research on radioactivity, who was the first woman to win a Nobel Prize and the first person to win a Nobel Prize twice. The statue was designed by Ludwika Nitschowa and unveiled on 5 September 1935.

== History ==
The monument was dedicated to Maria Skłodowska-Curie, a 19th- and 20th-century physicist and chemist who conducted pioneering research on radioactivity. She was the first woman to win a Nobel Prize and the first person to win a Nobel Prize twice. The statue was commissioned by Stefan Starzyński, the mayor of Warsaw, and designed by sculptor Ludwika Nitschowa. It was cast in the Bracia Łopieńscy alloy works. The statue was unveiled on 5 September 1935, near the Maria Skłodowska-Curie National Research Institute of Oncology. It was placed near a tree that was planted by Skłodowska-Curie in 1932.

The monument was damaged during the Warsaw Uprising in the Second World War, when it was used by soldiers of the Russian People's Liberation Army, a Russian collaborationist formation of the Protection Squadron, as a practice target. It was renovated in 1997, however the bullet holes were left in, as a reminder of the conflict.

== Characteristics ==
The monument is placed in the Maria Skłodowska-Curie Park, near the intersection of Wawelska and Skłodowskiej-Curie Streets, which is next to the Maria Skłodowska-Curie National Research Institute of Oncology. It is placed near a tree that was planted by Skłodowska-Curie in 1932.

It consists of a bronze statue of Maria Skłodowska-Curie, placed on a pedestal. She is depicted in reflecting pose, while walking, with her head pointed down and her chin resting on the palm of her hand. The monument has a total height of around 3 m. It features an inscription as transcribed below.

Polish inscription

MARJI
SKŁODOWSKIEJ-CURIE
STOLICA
1935

English translation

To Maria Skłodowska-Curie, the capital, 1935

== See also ==
- Maria Skłodowska-Curie Monument (Downtown, Warsaw), another monument in Warsaw dedicated to Skłodowska-Curie
