= Maria Skłodowska-Curie Park =

Urban park in Warsaw, Poland

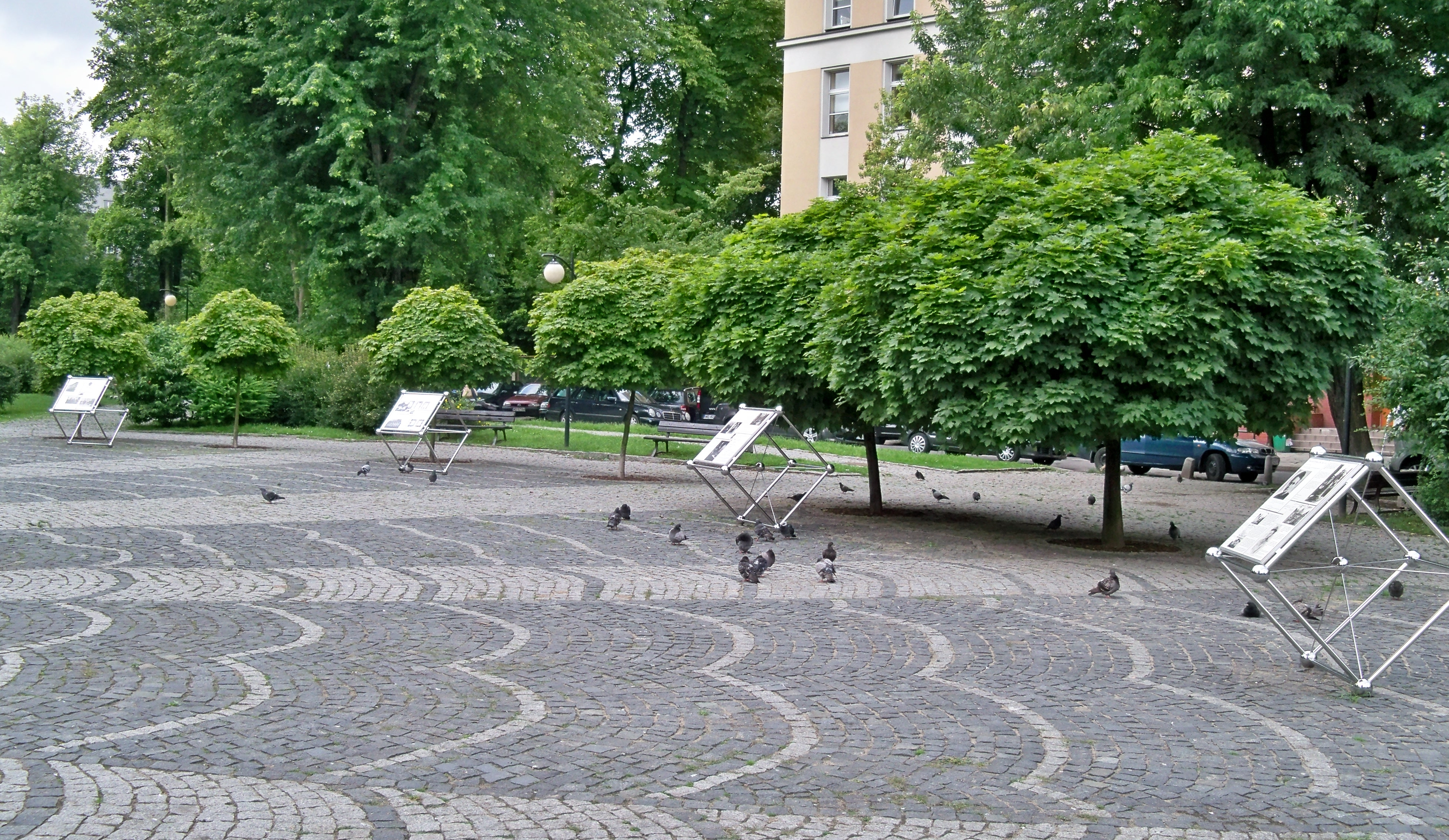
- An avenue in the park in 2011.
- Interactive map of Maria Skłodowska-Curie Park
- Type: Urban park
- Location: Ochota, Warsaw, Poland
- Coordinates: 52.214825°N 20.984625°E
- Area: 2.16 hectares (5.3 acres)
- Created: 29 May 1932

Maria Skłodowska-Curie Park (Note: Polish pronunciation: [ˈma.rja skwɔˈdɔf.ska kiˈri]; French pronunciation: [ˈkjʊəri]) (Polish: Park im. Marii Skłodowskiej-Curie) is an urban park in Warsaw, Poland, located in the district of Ochota, between Wawelska, Skłodowskiej-Curie, Hoffmanowej, Miecznikowa, and Pogorzelskiego Streets. The park, named after Maria Curie, was opened on 29 May 1932, together with the nearby National Research Institute of Oncology

== History ==
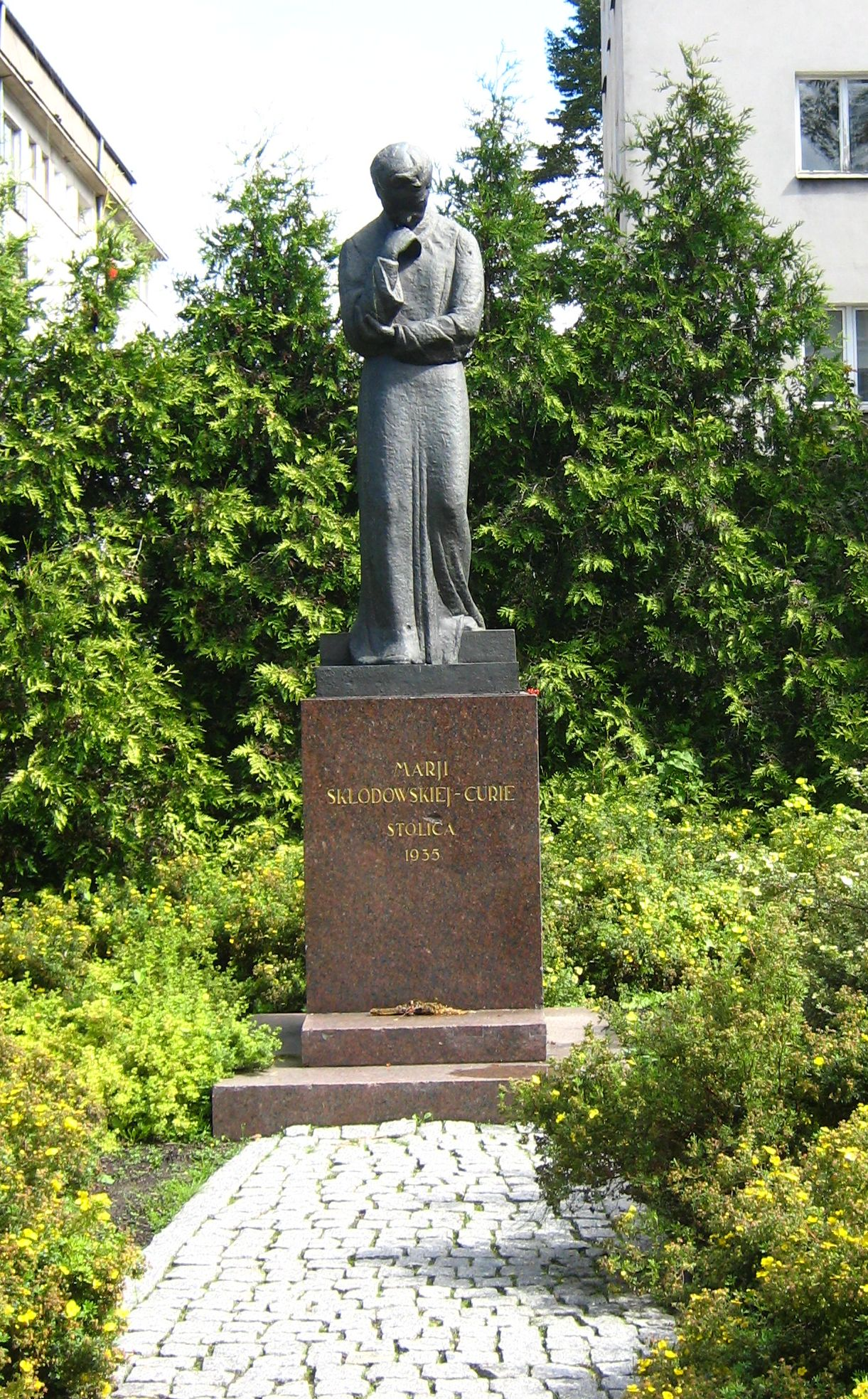
The Maria Skłodowska-Curie Monument unveiled in the park in 1935.

It was originally developed in the 1930s as a garden square, located next to the Maria Skłodowska-Curie National Research Institute of Oncology (originally known as the Radium Institute). During the latter's opening ceremony on 29 May 1932, Maria Skłodowska-Curie planted a sycamore tree there.

On 5 September 1935, a monument to Maria Skłodowska-Curie was unveiled in the park. She was a 19th- and 20th-century physicist and chemist who conducted pioneering research on radioactivity, and the first woman to win a Nobel Prize, as well as the first person to win a Nobel Prize twice. The bronze statue was commissioned by Stefan Starzyński, the mayor of Warsaw, and designed by sculptor Ludwika Nitschowa. The monument was damaged during the Warsaw Uprising in the Second World War, when it was used by soldiers of the Russian People's Liberation Army, a Russian collaborationist formation off the Protection Squadron, as a practice target. It was renovated in 1997, however the bullet holes were left in, as a reminder of the conflict.

After the war, the garden square was given the status of an urban park and named after Skłodowska-Curie.

It was renovated in 2023, and reopened on 11 December of that year. The date was chosen because it coincided with the 120th anniversary of Maria and Pierre Curie receiving a Nobel Prize in Physics on 10 December 1903.

== Characteristics ==
The park has the shape of a long rectangle and is located in the neighbourhood of Old Ochota, between Wawelska, Skłodowskiej-Curie, Hoffmanowej, Miecznikowa, and Pogorzelskiego Streets. It has a total area of 2.16 ha.

In its northern portion, next to Wawelska Street is a monument to Maria Skłodowska-Curie, in the form of bronze life-sized statue, designed by Ludwika Nitschowa.

Nearby, there is a sycamore tree named Maria, which has a status of a natural monument. It was originally planted by Skłodowska-Curie on 29 May 1932.
