= 1st Armoured Division of the Polish Armed Forces Square =

Garden Square in Warsaw, Poland

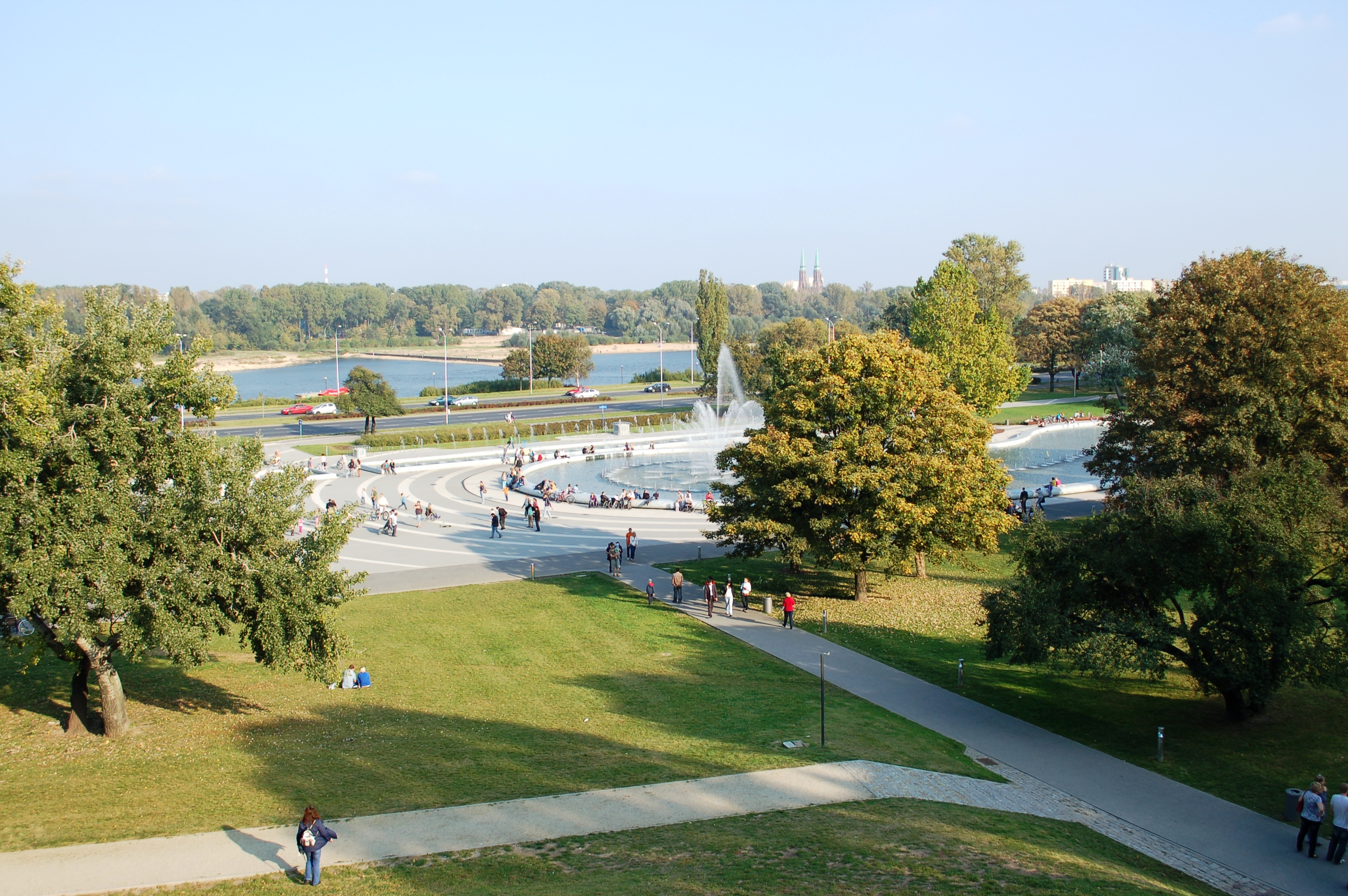
- The Multimedia Fountain Park at the centre of the garden square
- Interactive map of 1st Armoured Division of the Polish Armed Forces Square
- Type: Garden square
- Location: Downtown, Warsaw, Poland
- Coordinates: 52°15′13.0″N 21°00′32.5″E
- Area: 4.75 hectares (11.7 acres)
- Created: 1988
- Designer: Longin Majdecki

The 1st Armoured Division of the Polish Armed Forces Square (Polish: Skwer 1 Dywizji Pancernej WP) is a garden square in Warsaw, Poland, located within the New Town neighbourhood of Downtown district, between Boleść, Rybaki, Kościelna, and Wybrzeże Gdańskie Streets. It contains the Multimedia Fountain Park, a large complex of four fountains, used for show performances combining sound, water movement, light, and lasers. The area was opened in 1971, as the northern part of the Castle Foreground Park (Polish: Park Podzamcze), which was developed in place of housing and infrastructure demolished in 1944 during the Warsaw Uprising in the Second World War. The park was divided in 1988, with its northern portion forming the current garden square. The Multimedia Fountain Park was unveiled at it centre in 2011.

== Toponymy ==
The garden square was named in 1988, after the 1st Armoured Division of the Polish Armed Forces in the West, which fought at the Western Front of the Second World War, participating in the Allied liberation of Belgium, France, and the Netherlands. Prior to this, the area was part of the Castle Foreground Park (Polish: Park Podzamcze), named after the nearby Royal Castle.

== History ==
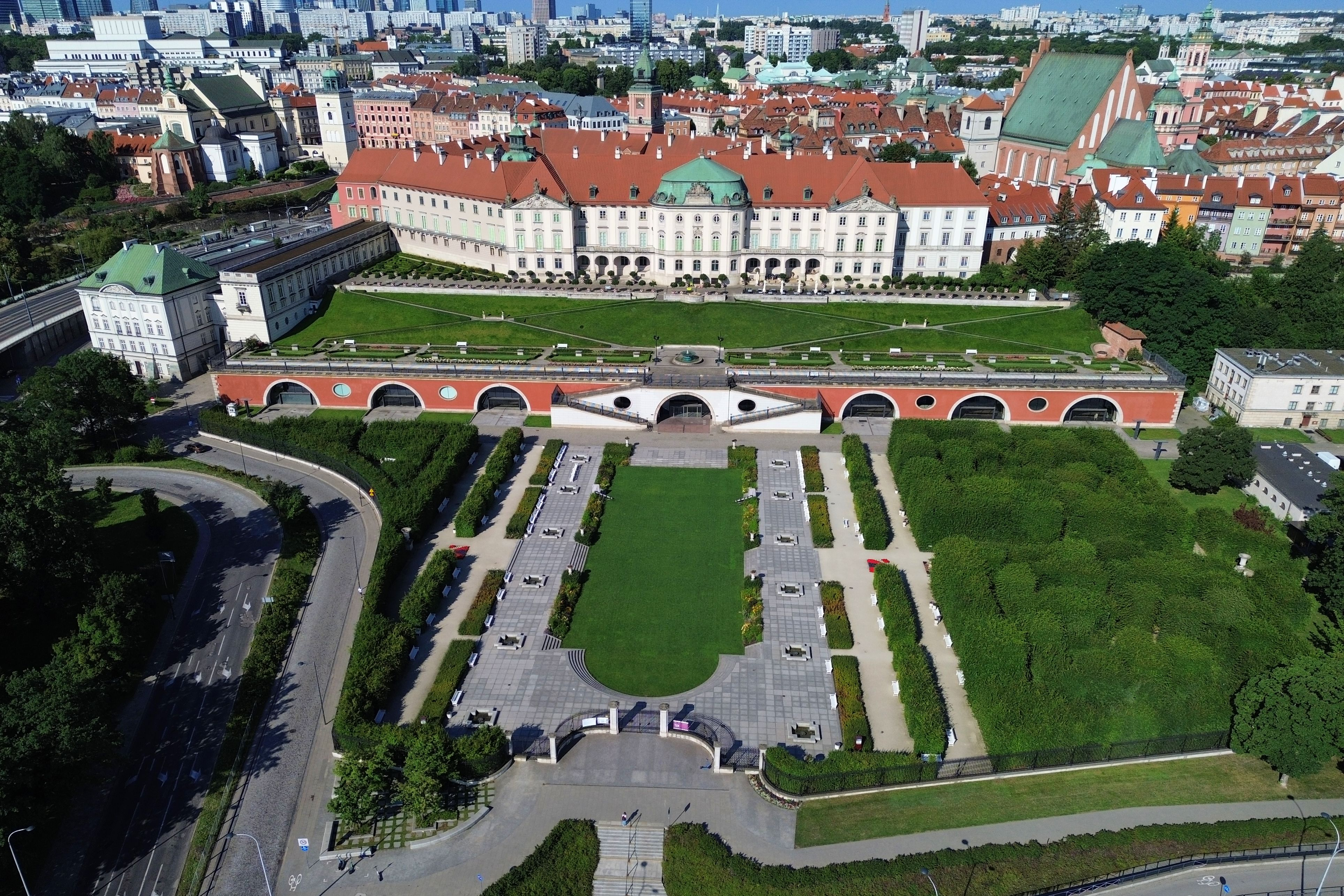
The Castle Gardens of the Royal Castle, dating to the Middle Ages, which, together with the current garden square, formed a part of the former Castle Foreground Park between 1971 and 1988

In the 14th century, a guard fort on the Warsaw Escarpment, located to the south-east of the current garden square, was developed into the Royal Castle made form bricks, which originally housed the dukes of Masovia, and later, the kings of Poland and the grand dukes of Lithuania. The complex had been expanded numerous times throughout the centuries. Beginning in the Middle Ages, a castle garden complex had been developed on the escarpment, later being expanded and redeveloped in the Renaissance style in the 16th century. They underwent further modifications in 17th and 18th centuries to increase their ornamental values. The area below the escarpment was incorporated into the castle complex in the second half of the 18th century, under the rule of king Stanisław August Poniatowski. A new large park complex, designed by Jakub Kubicki, was developed from the gardens between 1816 and 1818, combining areas below and on the escarpment. The Kubicki Arcades, a long building featuring seventeen Openwork arcades on its frontal wall, was constructed between 1818 and 1821, being imbedded into the side the escarpment. It provided a passageway bypassing the gardens, and was connected with staricasses connecting the both sides of the parkland. Following the fall of the January Uprising in 1863, the Imperial Russian Army demolished the lower portion of the gardens, replacing them with a military training area, and building several barracks and horse stables. Between 1915 and 1939, the castle underwent substantial renovations, during which the gardens were restored, in a form of a Baroque Revival French formal garden. The majorioty of the castle complex was destroyed in September 1944 in the Second World War, by the officers of the German Army, following the fall of the Warsaw Uprising. It was rebuilt between 1971 and 1973. The gardens, which survived the destruction, fell into deterioration and dilapidation from the neglect. The lower portion of the gardens was restored between 2017 and 2019.

In 1411, the Church of the Visitation of the Blessed Virgin Mary, a Gothic Roman Catholic parish church, was built to the east of the current garden square, at 2 Przyrynek Street. According to historical writtings, it was erected in place of a former Slavic pagan shrine. The building was expanded in the second half of the 15th century. It was burned down in 1656 by the Swedish Imperial Army after the siege of Warsaw during the Second Northern War, and was rebuilt around 1690. It was expanded several times throughout the 19th and 20th centuries, losing its original design. It was demolished in 1944 during the Warsaw Uprising in the Second World War. It was rebuilt between 1947 and 1952, being restored to its original design.

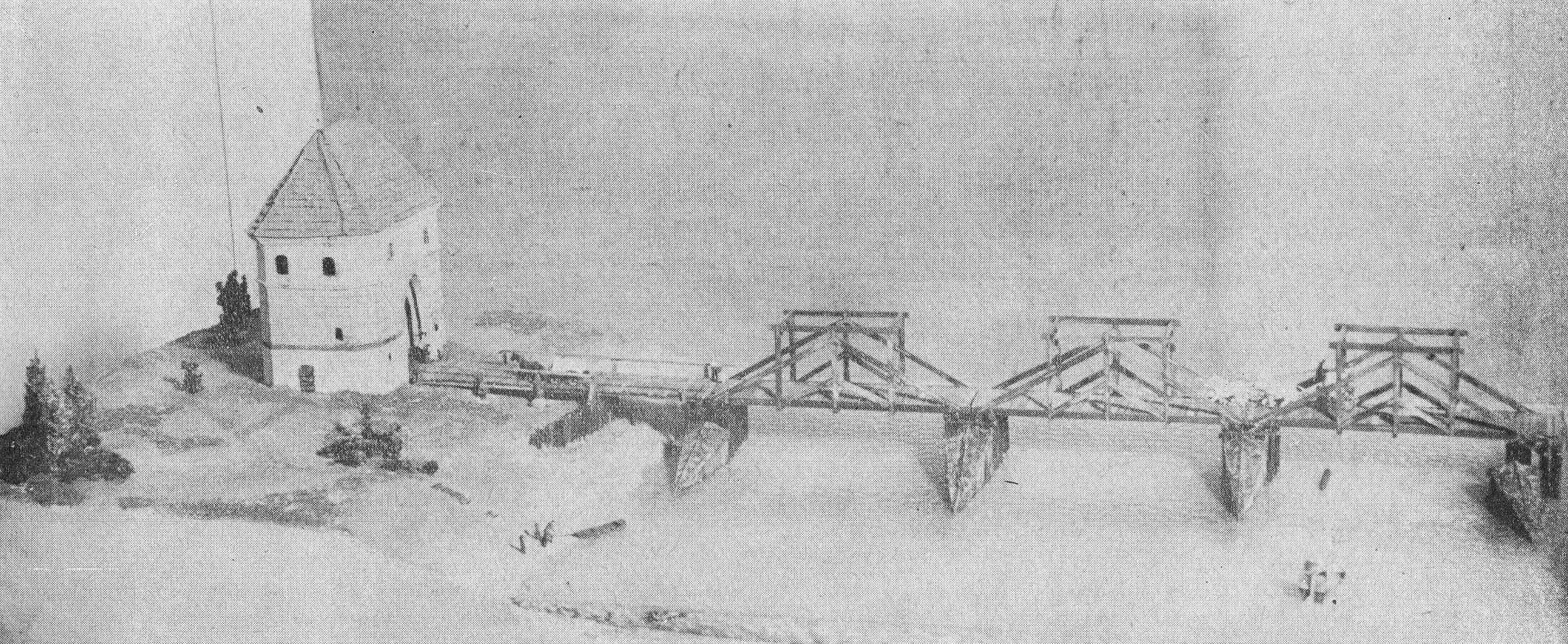
The model of the Brige Gate built in 1568, and the Sigismund Augustus Bridge, built in 1573 and demolished in 1603

Between 1568 and 1573, the Sigismund Augustus Bridge, a 500-metre-long (1640.42 ft.) wooden crossing over the Vistula river, was built, with one of its ends located at the current intersection of Boleść, Bugaj, and Rybaki Street. It partially crossed through the area of the current garden square, which at the time formed a part of the riverbed. In 1582, the Bridge Gate, a small Late Gothic guard gate, was built at the entrance to the bridge. After the bridge collapsed in 1603, the gate was turned into a gunpowder magazine. It was rebuilt and remodeled in the 18th century, and in 1767, it was transformed into a prison. In 1770, a neoclassical building was built to its west. The prison was closed down in 1833, with the structure being transformed into a residential building. It was burned down and severely damaged in 1944 during the Warsaw Uprising in the Second World War, and rebuilt in 1965.

In 1669, the St. Benno Church was built on the current 1 Piesza Street, next to the Church of the Visitation of the Blessed Virgin Mary, and near the eastern entrance to the current garden square on Kościelna Street. The Roman Catholic temple was originally used by the Confraternity of St. Benno, and at the end of the 17th century, it was transferred to a Redemptionist congregation. Following the creation of the Duchy of Warsaw in 1907, which formed a client state of the First French Empire during the Napoleonic Wars, the local Redemptorists were deemed hostile to the state government and Napoleon Bonaparte, and removed from the city in 1808. The former church building was subsequently used as barracks, a school, military magazine, housing, and eventually, a factory. It was demolished in 1944. Afterwards, it was given back to the Redemptorists, who had it rebuild in 1958.

Until the 16th century, the area of the current garden square was occupied by the village of Rybaki, placed alongside the current Rybaki Street, which now forms the main park alley. It was burned down in 1656 by the Swedish Imperial Army, following the siege of Warsaw during the Second Northern War.

In the 15th century, several granaries and tenements begun developing alongside Bugaj Street, which currently crosses alongside the garden square, and at the time, lied near the coast of the Vistula river. Beginning in 1790, tenements were developed alongside Boleść Street. At the end of the end of the 18th century, and continuing through the 19th century, tenement were developed alongside the street, including on its right side, after the riverbed moved further to the northeast. Between 1733 and 1760, a wooden manor house, owned by nobleman Jan Baptysta Chrzciciel Czempiński, was built in the area of the modern garden square, at the current 8 and 10 Rybaki Street. Before 1784, it was replaced by a two-storey tavern building, with two wings on its sides, with large gates. In 1815, the main part of the building was expanded with another storey. It was destroyed during the Second World War, with its ruins being removed in 1955.

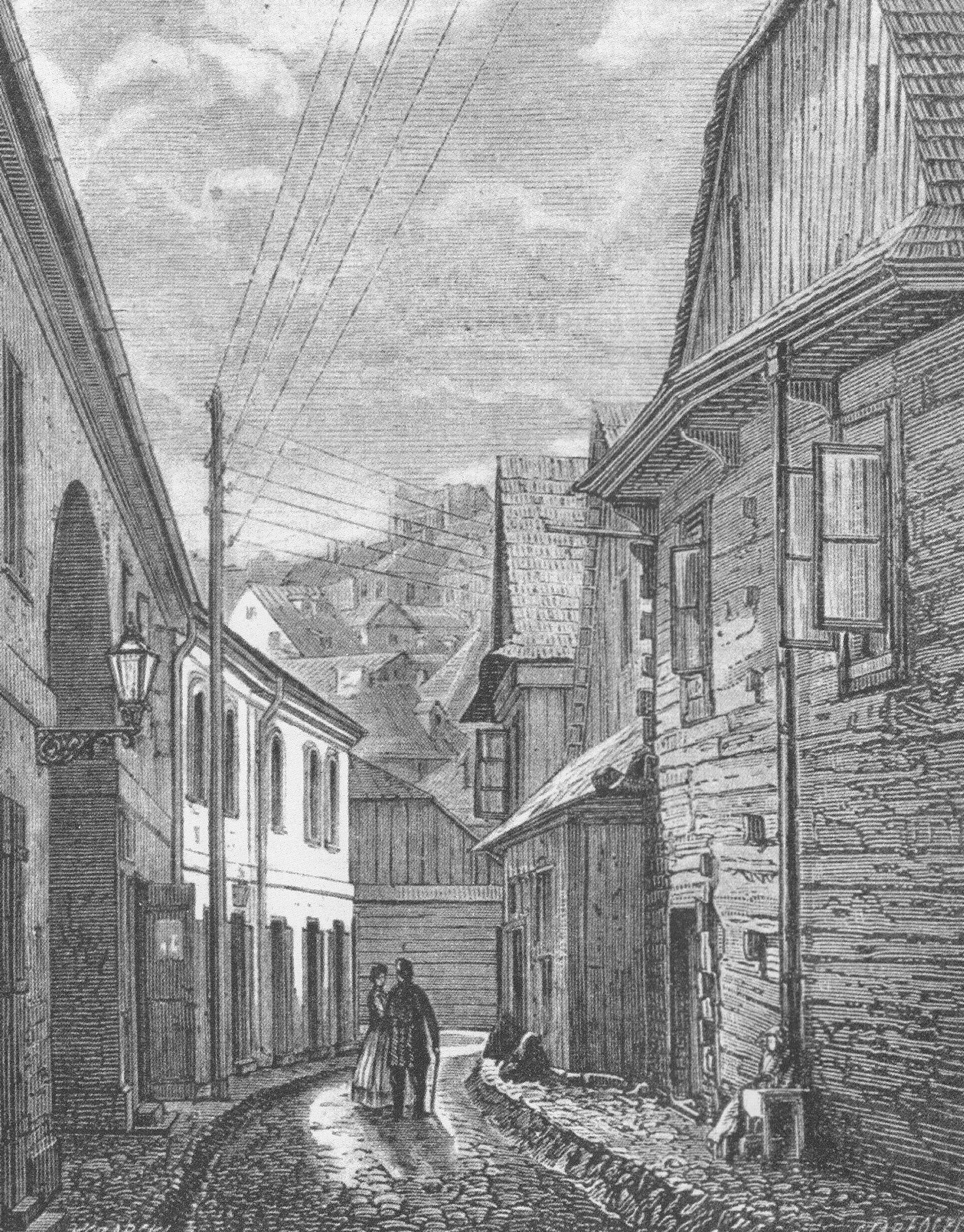
Ilustration of the wooden houses on Rybaki Street in 1869, in the area of the modern garden square

At the turn of 18th and 19th centuries, around fifty wooden houses were built alongside Rybaki Street. Due to the close location to Vistula river they often suffered damage and destruction from flooding, as well as frequent fires. Alongside them were also present farming and watermills. In 1790, a slaughterhouse was built at 8A Rybaki Street. It was replaced with a new slaughterhouse complex built between 1819 and 1820. The building burned down in 1814. In 1907, the Quebracho Joint Stock Company Tanning Extract Factory was built at 6 Rybaki Street. In 1925, a primary school building was built at 32 Rybaki Street. In 1939, the Marshal Józef Piłsudski House of Poles from Abroad, was built at 14 and 16 Rybaki Street. It housed a community centre for the Polish diaspora. Destroyed in 1944 during the Second World War, it is commemorated with an inscribed large stone stone block in the garden. Furthermore, in 1938, the barracks of the Castle Unit of the President of Poland, a unit of the Polish Armed Forces, were built at 14 Bugaj Street, at the corner with Wodna Street. The unit was later dissolved in 1939. The structure was destroyed in 1944, and rebuilt afterwards, currently, the building separates the 1st Armoured Division of the Polish Armed Forces Square from the Karolina Lanckorońska Square. Additionally, in 1935, the modernist preschool building, known as the Michalina Mościcka Preschool, was built at 10 Bugaj Street, within the area of the current Karolina Lanckorońska Square. It was destroyed in 1944.

Following the beginning of the Warsaw Uprising during the Second World War on 1 August 1944, the neighbourhoods of Old Town and New Town were under the control of the Polish insurgents. This included the area of Boleść, Bugaj, and Rybaki Streets, including the buildings of the Bridge Gate and the factory. The same day, they began building the barricades and fought the first skirmish in the area. The next day, the insurgents captured the nearby building of the Polish Security Printing Works near the intersection of Rybaki and Wójtowska Streets. They regularly repelled the attacks from the German Army. Between 25 and 28 August, the area suffered heavy artillery and aerial bombardment, resulting the destruction of all buildings there, and heavy casualties among the insurgents. They retreated from the area on 31 August via the sewer system. Majority of the buildings in the area of Boleść, Bugaj, and Rybaki Streets were demolished during the fighting, with only a few of the tenements being rebuilt after the end of the conflict. The ruins of the factory were removed in the 1960s.

The area was redeveloped as an urban park between the end of the 1960s and beginning of the 1970s, with an unpaid labour from the youth volunteers during the state-promoted weekend social events known as the social deed. It was designed by Longin Majdecki, and named the Castle Foreground Park (Polish: Park Podzamcze), after the Royal Castle located to its south-west. It was opened on 30 July 1971. The park stretched alongside Wybrzeże Gdańskie Street, below the Warsaw Escarpment, from Sanguszki Street in the north to the Royal Castle, and had an area of 12.9 ha (31.9 acres). It included the historic lower portion of the Castle Gardens next to the castle. In 1988, the portion to the north-west of Boleść Street was separated, forming the 1st Armoured Division of the Polish Armed Forces Square. The area to the south-east, between Boleść and Steinkellera Streets formed another garden square, named the Karolina Lanckorońska Square (Polish: Skwer Karoliny Lanckorońskiej), after Karolina Lanckorońska, a 20th-century historian, academic, and a member of the Polish resistance in the Second World War. The portion of the former Castle Gardens, located further to the south-east was later restored to his historical state, and reopened 2019.

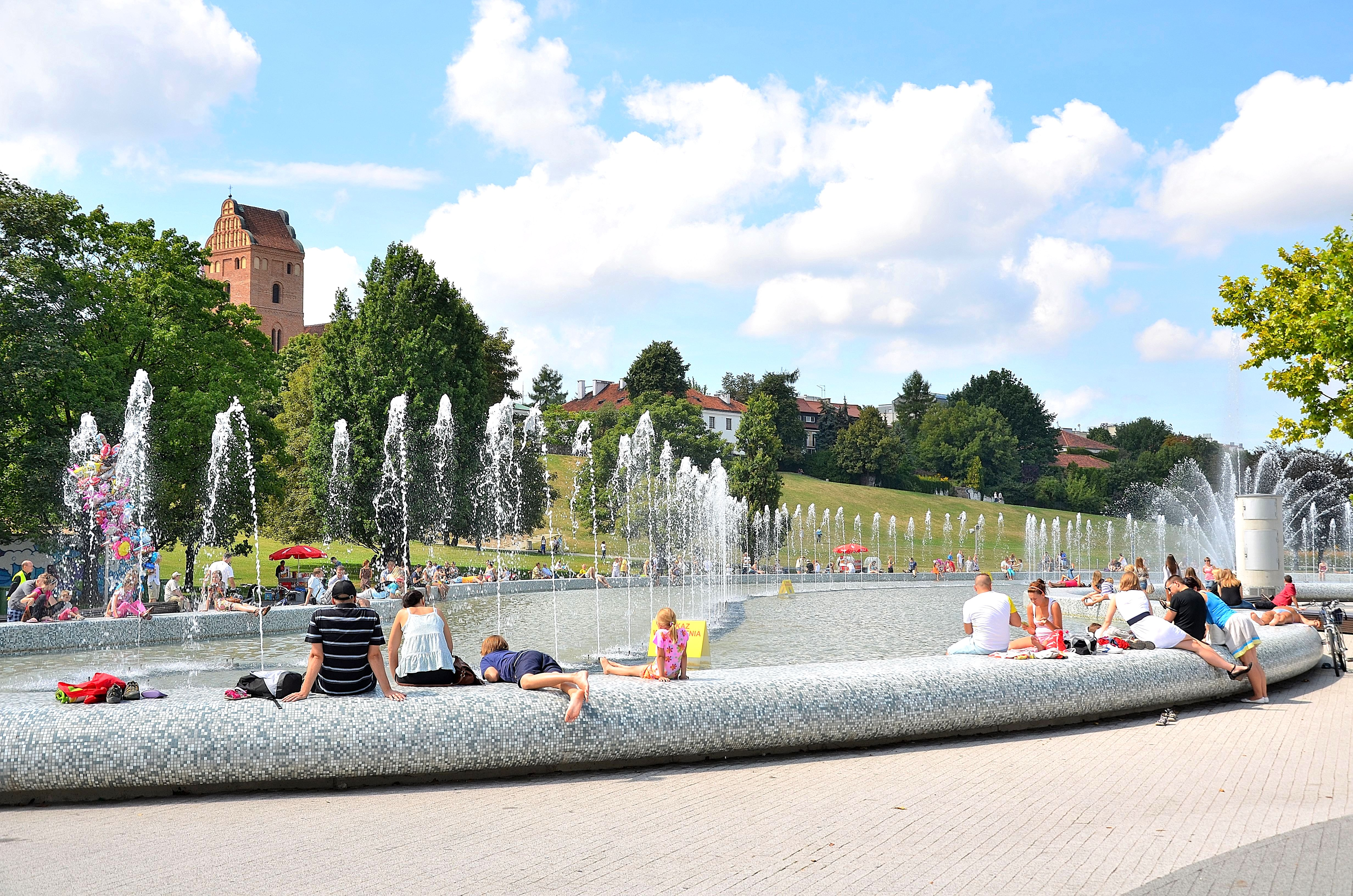
The Multimedia Fountain Park, opened in 2011

The Multimedia Fountain Park, a large complex of fountains in the centre of the park, was opened there on 7 May 2011, to celebrate the 125th anniversary of the founding of the Municipal Waterworks and Sewage Company of the Capital City of Warsaw. It was built in place of a shallow pond. On the same day, the statue of William Heerlein Lindley, an engineer who oversaw the construction of the city's waterworks and sewage network, was unveiled nearby. It was designed by Norbert Sarnecki and Anna Sarnecka. The fountain complex is used to show performances combining sound, water movement, light, and lasers, organised by the Capital Stage (Polish: Stołeczna Estrada).

On 4 June 2014, the statue of Maria Skłodowska-Curie was unveiled at the entrance to the park. It was placed near the intersection of Kościelna and Piesza Streets, in front of the Church of the Visitation of the Blessed Virgin Mary at 2 Przyrynek Street, and near the tenement at 16 Freta Street, where Skłodowska-Curie was born and grew up. The bronze statue was designed by Bronisław Krzysztof. Skłodowska-Curie was a 19th- and 20th-century physicist and chemist who conducted pioneering research on radioactivity and was the first woman to win a Nobel Prize, as well as the first person to win the award twice.

Two 3-metre-tall (9.84 ft.) statues were placed at the square, near the Multimedia Fountain Park, in 2017 and 2018, respectively. The former depicts a basilisk, and the latter, a bear with a squirrel seating on its back. They were unveiled as part of the fountain show performances The Return of the Basilisk (Polish: Powrót Bazyliszka) in 2017, and The Duke Bear (Polish: Książe Niedzwiedz) in 2018, based on the legends about the basilisk, and about the Duke Bear, a fictitious Duke of Masovia.

== Characteristics ==
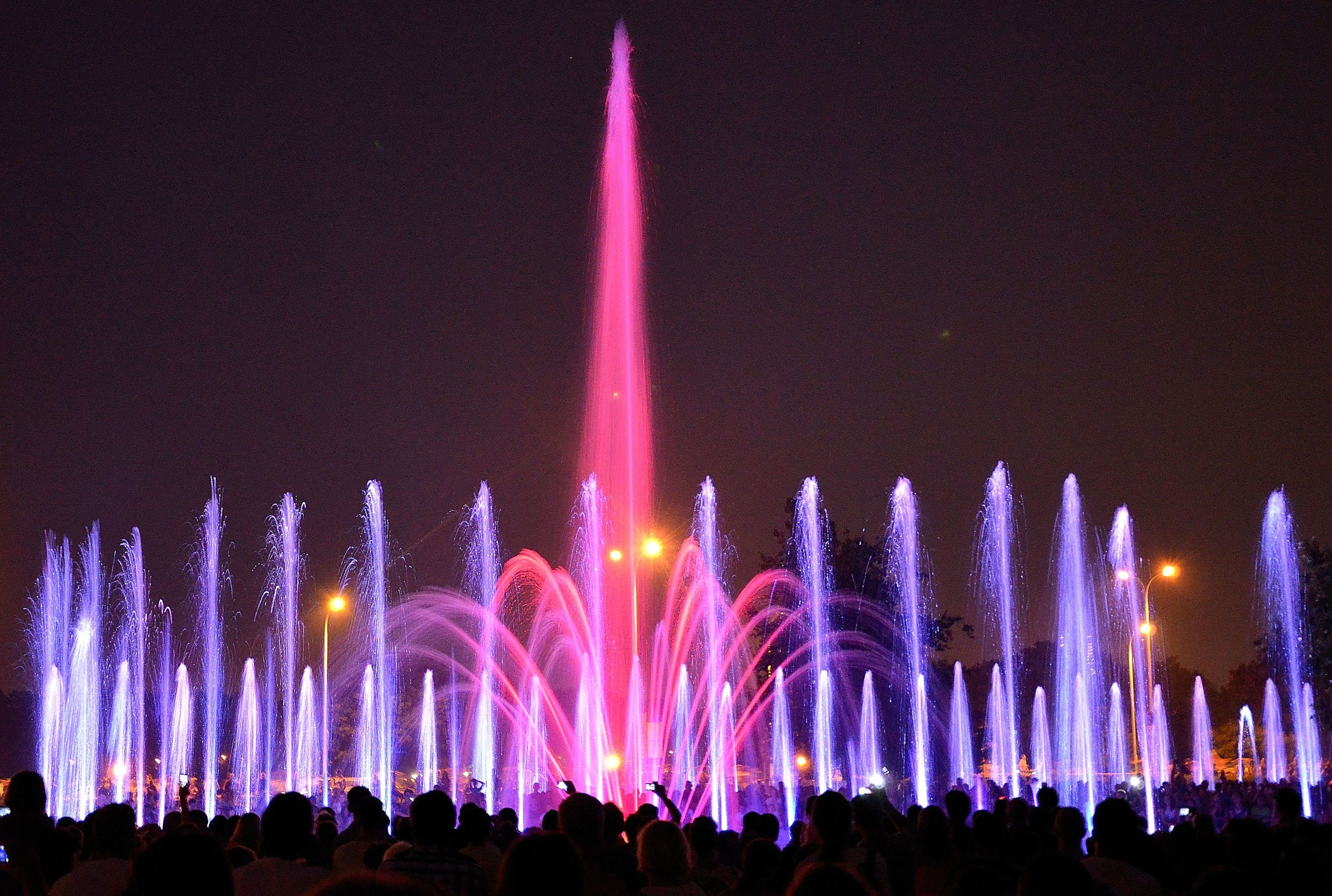
The water, light, and sound show created at the fountain complex at night

The garden square is placed between Boleść, Rybaki, Kościelna, and Wybrzeże Gdańskie Streets, and the peaks of the Warsaw Escarpment, and has an area of 4.75 ha (11.7 acres). It is crossed through by Rybaki Street, which forms its main avenue. It borders the Romuald Traugutt Park to the north, and Karolina Lanckorońska Square (Polish: Skwer Karoliny Lanckorońskiej) to the south. In its centre, it features the Multimedia Fountain Park, a large complex of four fountains with a total area of 2,870 m^{2} (0.11 sq. mi.) They are used in the show performances combining sound, water movement, light, and lasers, organised by the Capital Stage (Polish: Stołeczna Estrada).

The square also includes two bronze statues, dedicated to chemist Maria Skłodowska-Curie by Bolesław Krzysztof, placed on Kościelna Street, and engineer William Heerlein Lindley by Norbert Sarnecki and Anna Sarnecka, placed on Rybaki Street. The latter has a form of a memorial bench with a statue placed next to it. It also features a rock with commemorative plaque on it, dedicated to Stanisław Maczek, who was the commander of the 1st Armoured Division during the Second World War, as well as a monument, in form of a stone block with an inscription, dedicated to the Marshal Józef Piłsudski House of Poles from Abroad, which housed a community centre for the Polish diaspora in other countries, which stood at that location from 1939 to 1944. The garden square also includes two 3-metre-tall (9.84 ft.) statues, titled The Return of the Basilisk (Polish: Powrót Bazyliszka), and The Duke Bear (Polish: Książe Niedzwiedz), which depict a basilisk, and a bear with a squirrel seating on its back, respectively.

Two historic Roman Catholic churches, the Church of the Visitation of the Blessed Virgin Mary and the St. Benno Church, with their history dating to 1411 and 1669, are placed next to the eastern boundary of the garden square, near its entrance on Kościelna Street. The Bridge Gate, a historic Gothic Revival and neoclassical building, is also present next to the southern boundary of the garden square, at the intersection of Boleść and Rybaki Streets.

== Gallery ==
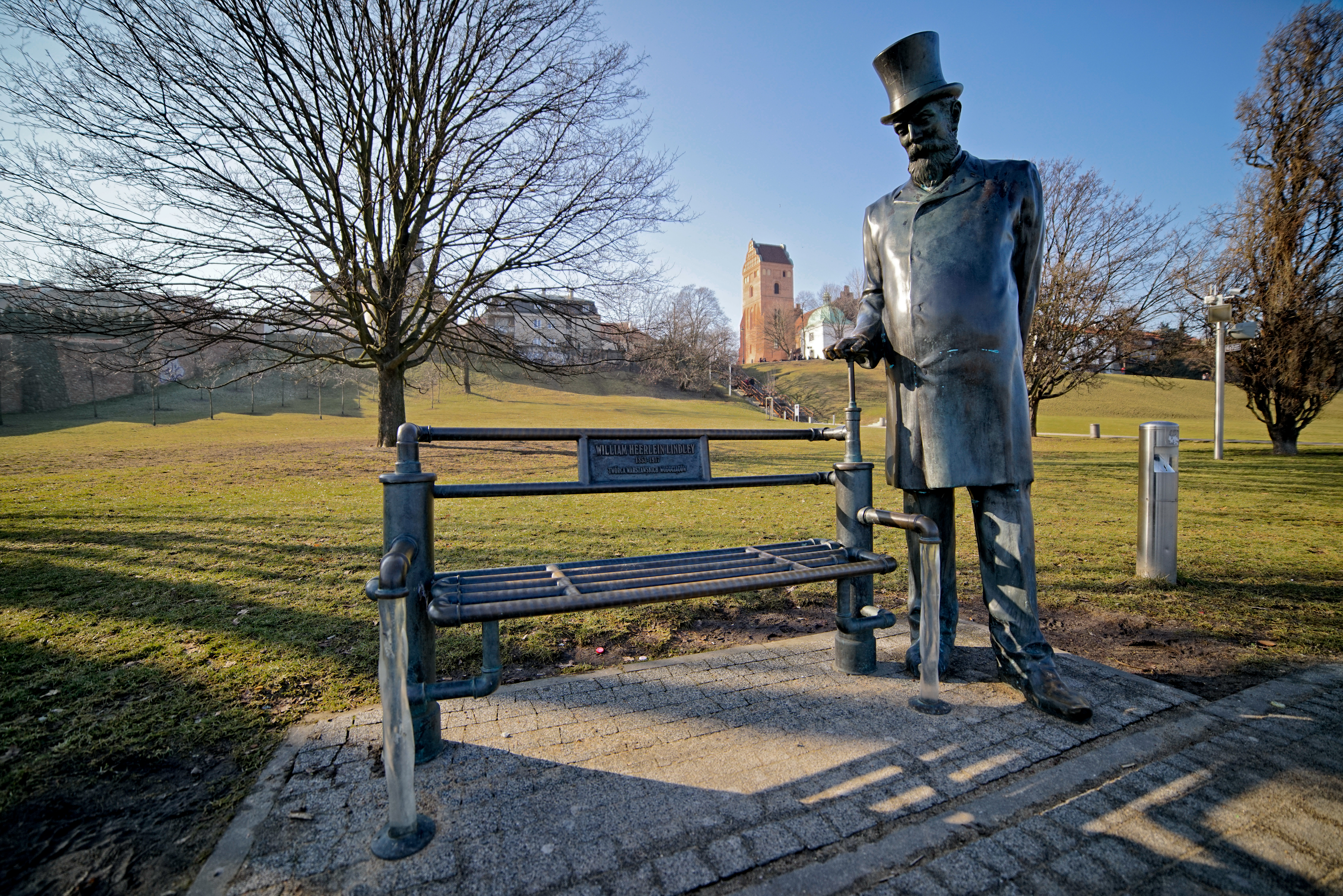
The William Heerlein Lindley Bench

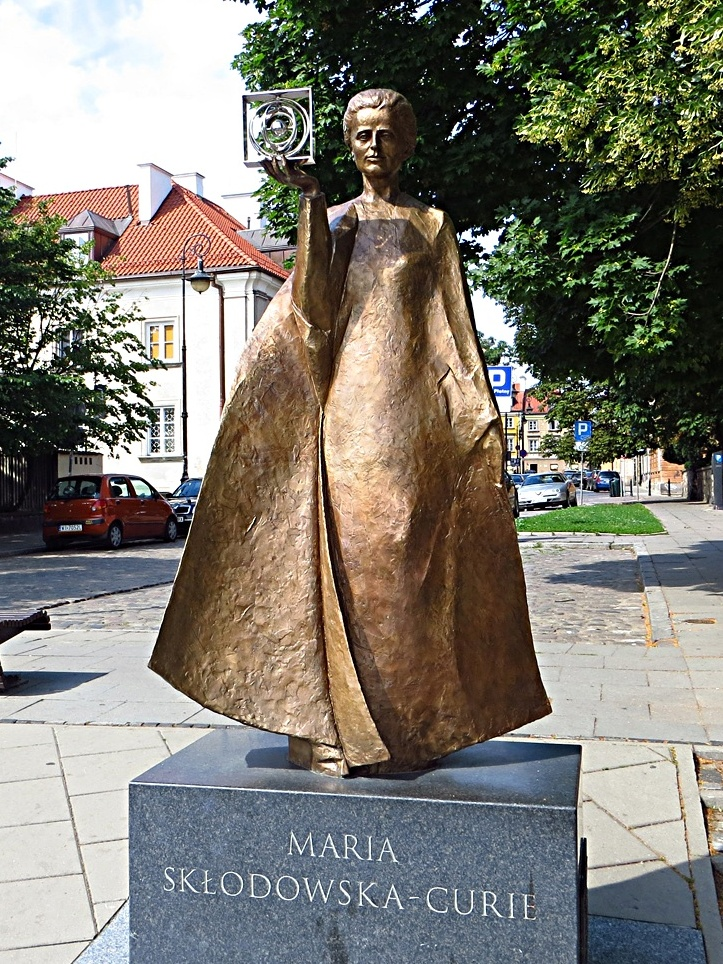
The statue of Maria Skłodowska-Curie

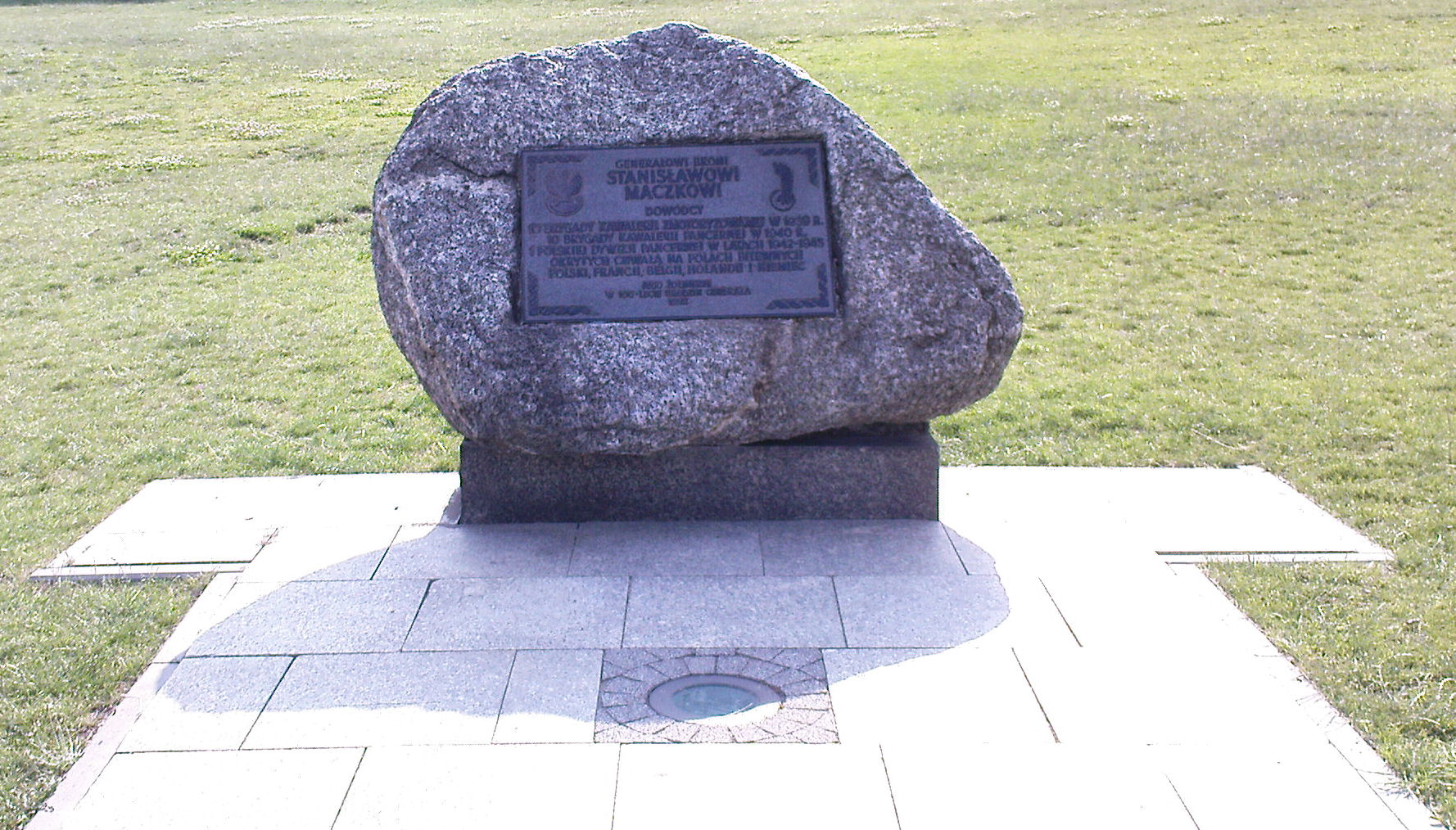
The commemorative plaque dedicated to Stanisław Maczek

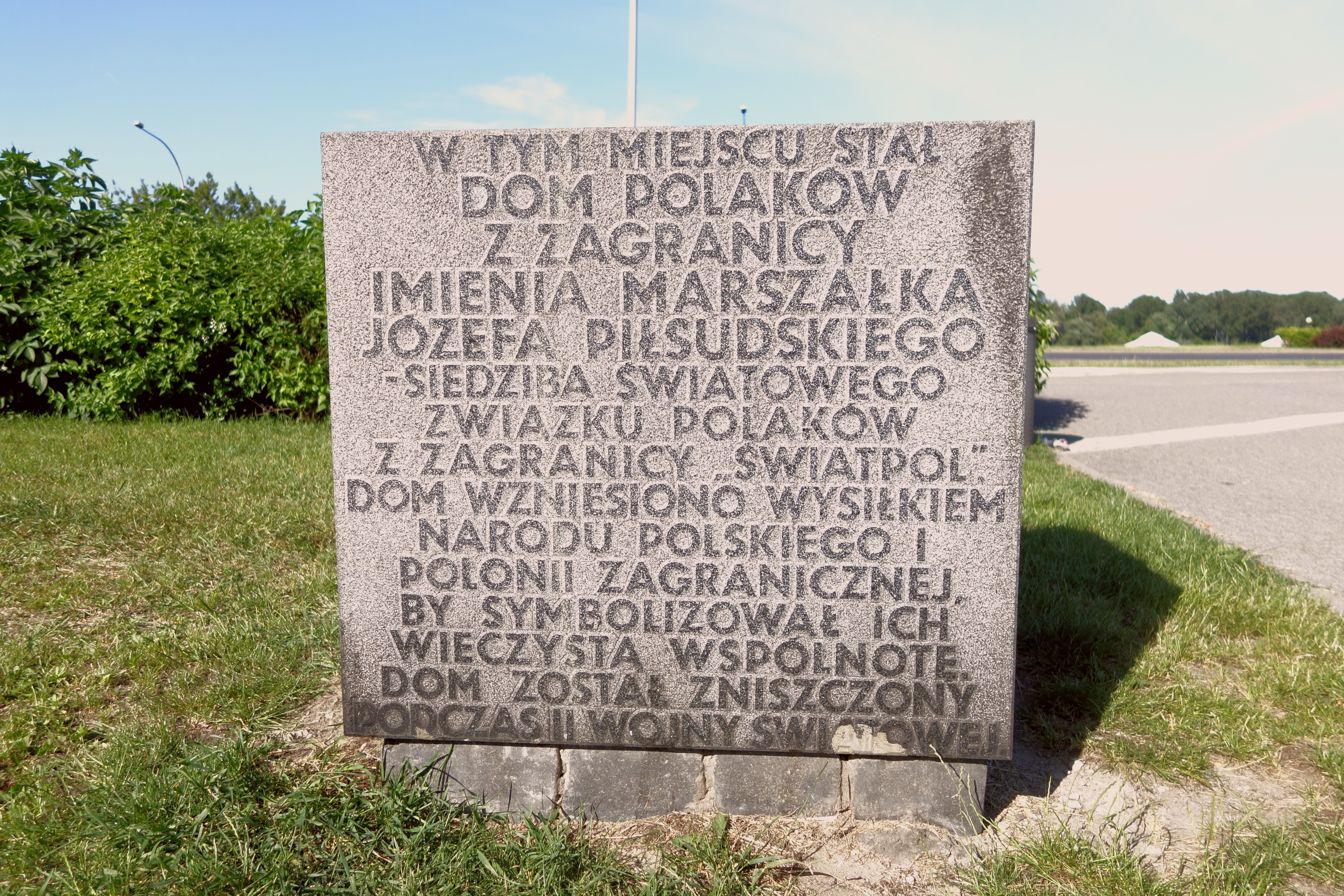
The memorial to the Marshal Józef Piłsudski House of Poles from Abroad, which housed a community centre for the Polish diaspora in other countries, built in 1939 and demolished in 1944
