= William Heerlein Lindley Bench =

2011 bronze sculpture in Warsaw, Poland

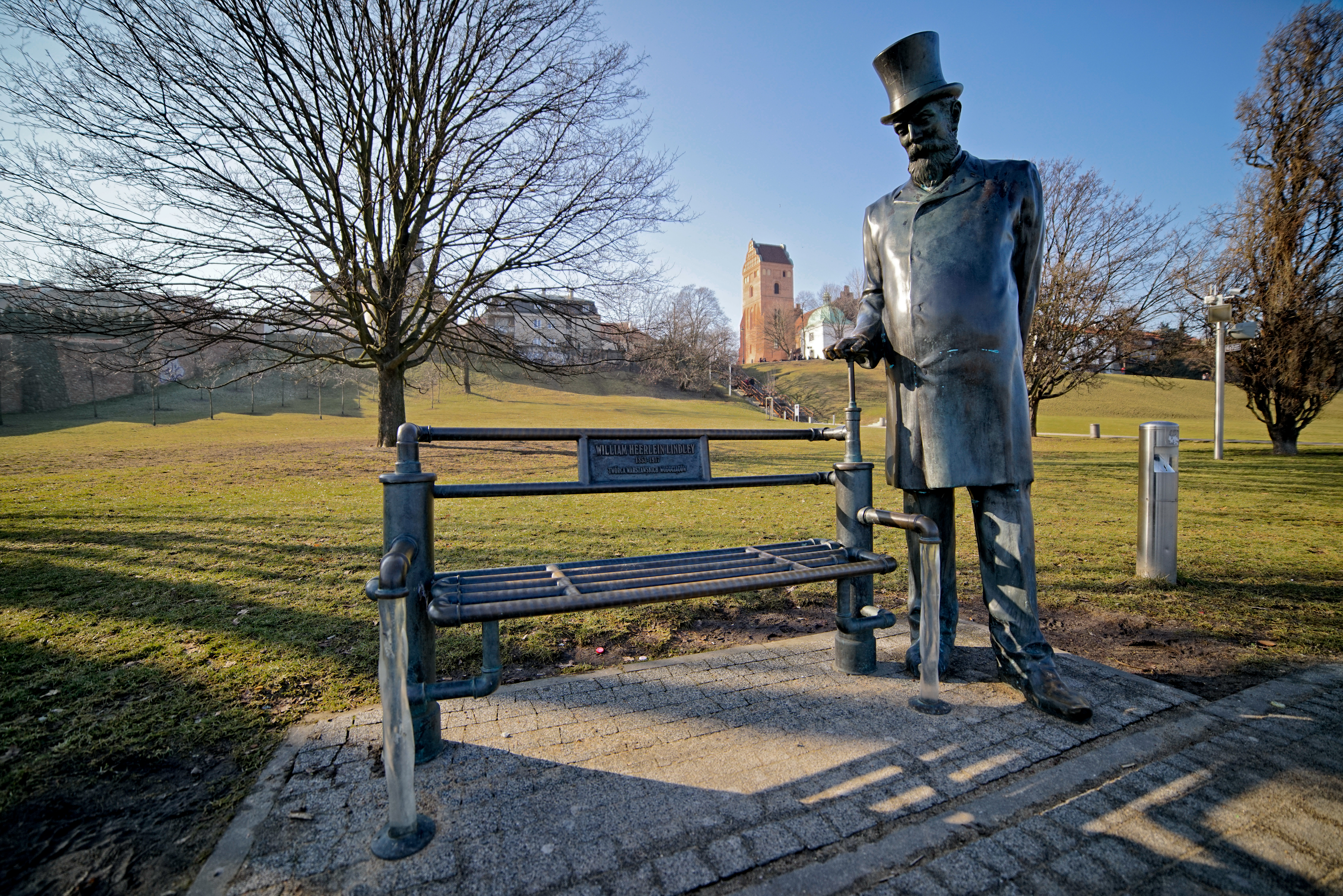
- The monument in 2015.
- Interactive map of William Heerlein Lindley Bench
- Location: 1st Armoured Division of the Polish Armed Forces Square, Downtown, Warsaw, Poland
- Coordinates: 52°15′15.27″N 21°00′38.34″E
- Designer: Norbert Sarnecki; Anna Sarnecka
- Type: Statue, bench monument
- Material: Bronze
- Dedicated to: William Heerlein Lindley

The William Heerlein Lindley Bench (Polish: Ławeczka Williama Heerleina Lindleya) is a sculpture in Warsaw, Poland, placed at the 1st Armoured Division of the Polish Armed Forces Square, within the New Town neighbourhood of the Downtown district. It consists of a bronze statue of William Heerlein Lindley, a 19th- and 20th-century engineer who oversaw the construction of the city's waterworks and sewage network, placed next to a bench, made from water pumps and pipes. It was designed by Norbert Sarnecki and Anna Sarnecka, and unveiled on 7 May 2011.

== History ==
The monument was designed by Norbert Sarnecki and Anna Sarnecka, and unveiled on 7 May 2011, on the 125th anniversary of the founding of the Municipal Waterworks and Sewage Company of the Capital City of Warsaw.

== Design ==
The monument is placed next to the Multimedia Fountain Park, a complex of four large fountains in the 1st Armoured Division of the Polish Armed Forces Square. It consists of a bronze statue, depicting William Heerlein Lindley wearing a large overcoat and a top hat. Next to it is placed a bench, made from water pipes welded together, with two water pumps on both sides acting at its legs. Each has attached sculptures resembling water flowing from the pipes to the ground. The bench features a plaque, which reads:

Polish inscription

William Heerlein Lindley
1853–1917
Twórca warszawskich wodociągów

Translation:
English translation

William Heerlein Lindley
1853–1917
The creator of the Warsaw waterworks

== Gallery ==
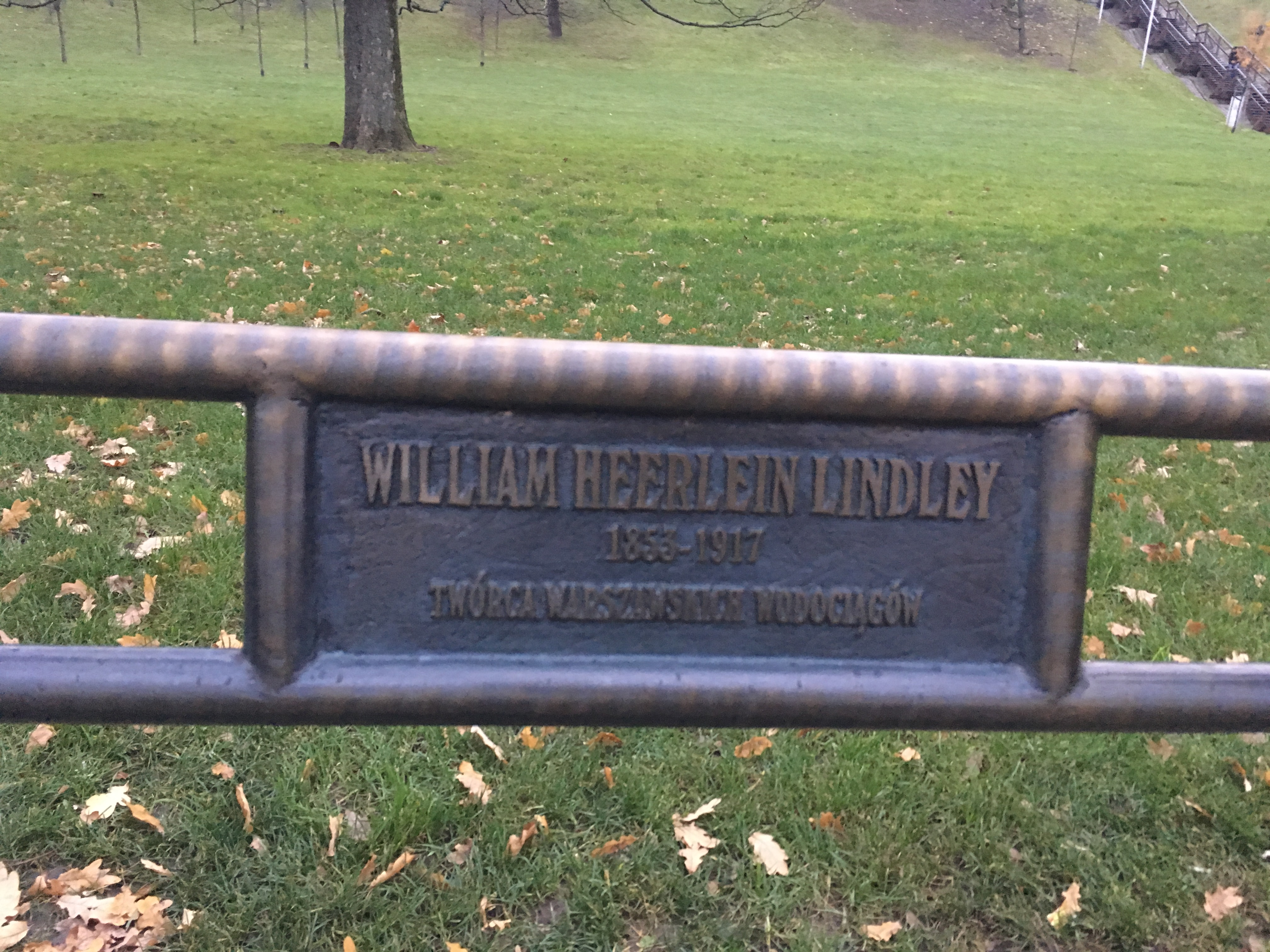
The commemorative plaque on the bench.
