= Statue of Maria Skłodowska-Curie (Downtown, Warsaw) =

Monument in Warsaw, Poland

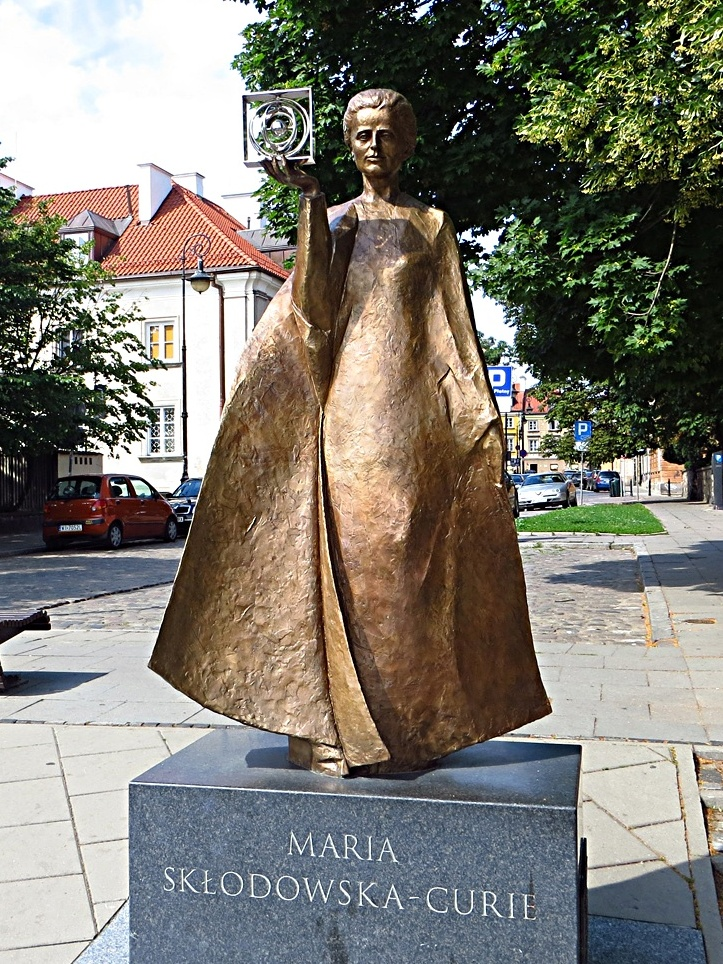
- The monument in 2016
- Interactive map of Statue of Maria Skłodowska-Curie
- Location: Warsaw, Poland
- Coordinates: 52.254127°N 21.009505°E
- Designer: Bronisław Krzysztof
- Type: Statue
- Material: Bronze
- Height: 1.9 m (6 ft 3 in)
- Opening date: 4 June 2014
- Dedicated to: Maria Skłodowska-Curie

The statue of Maria Skłodowska-Curie (Note: Polish pronunciation: [ˈma.rja skwɔˈdɔf.ska kiˈri]; French pronunciation: [ˈkjʊəri]) (Polish: Pomnik Marii Skłodowskiej-Curie) is a bronze statue in Warsaw, Poland, located within the New Town neighbourhood of the Downtown district. It is dedicated to Maria Skłodowska-Curie, a 19th- and 20th-century physicist and chemist who conducted pioneering research on radioactivity and was the first woman to win a Nobel Prize, as well as the first person to win a Nobel Prize twice. The statue was designed by Bronisław Krzysztof and unveiled on 4 June 2014. It is placed near the intersection of Kościelna and Piesza Streets, in front of the Church of the Visitation of the Blessed Virgin Mary at 2 Przyrynek Street, and near the tenement at 16 Freta Street, where Skłodowska-Curie was born and grew up.

== History ==
The monument was dedicated to Maria Skłodowska-Curie, a 19th- and 20th-century physicist and chemist who conducted pioneering research on radioactivity. She was the first woman to win a Nobel Prize and the first person to win a Nobel Prize twice. The statue was financed by the Association of the Legion of Honour Members and designed by Bronisław Krzysztof. It was unveiled on 4 June 2014 by President of Poland Bronisław Komorowski and President of France François Hollande. The ceremony was attended by Hanna Gronkiewicz-Waltz, the mayor of Warsaw, and Lena Kolarska-Bobińska, the minister of science and higher education.

== Characteristics ==
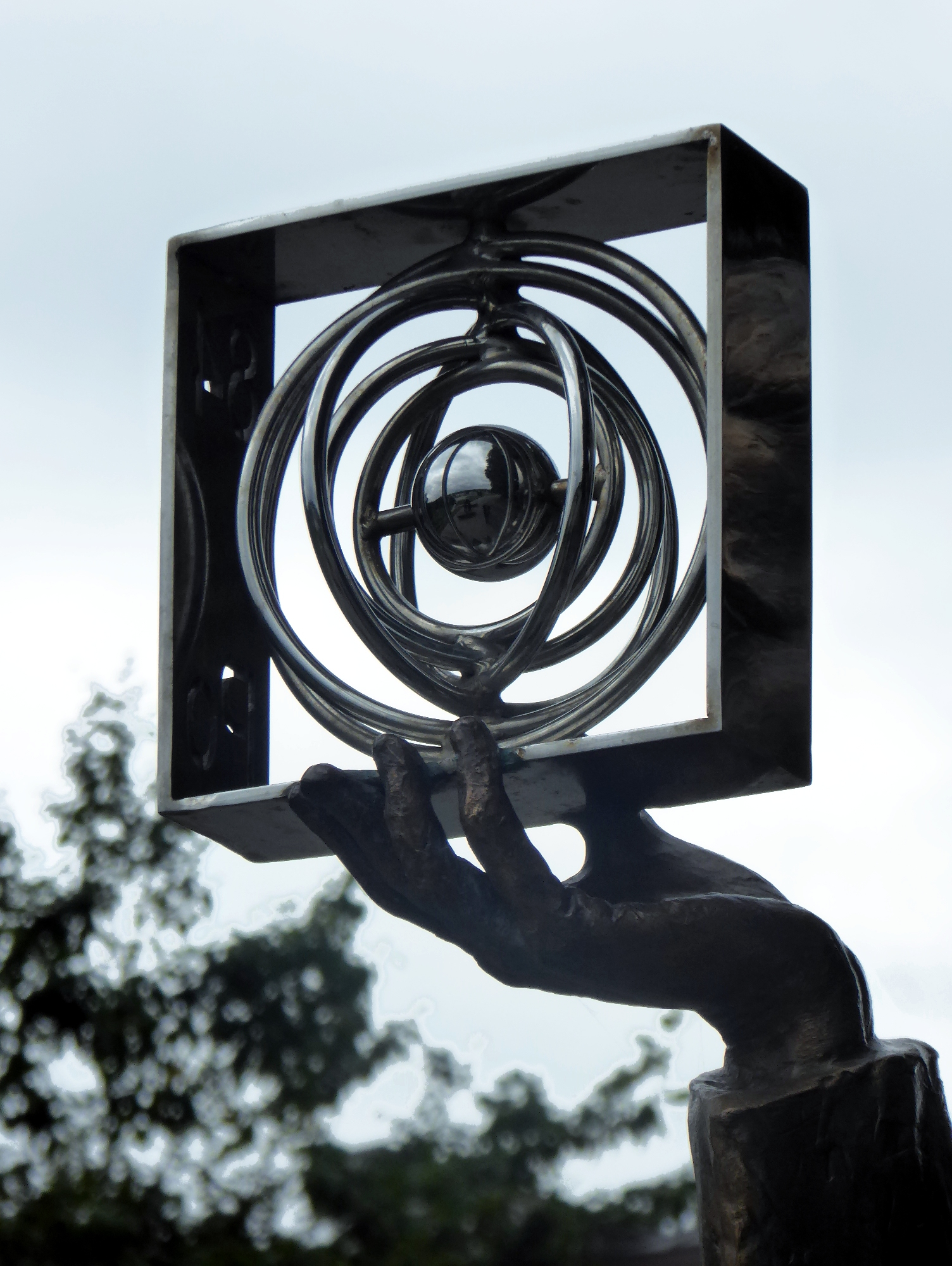
The sculpture representing polonium.

The monument is placed near the intersection of Kościelna and Piesza Streets, in front of Church of the Visitation of the Blessed Virgin Mary at 2 Przyrynek Street, and near the tenement at 16 Freta Street, where Maria Skłodowska-Curie was born and grew up. It is facing the Vistula river and located next to the 1st Armoured Division of the Polish Armed Forces Square. The location was chosen as a place Skłodowska-Curie liked to visit. The monument consists of a bronze statue depicting her in an oversized laboratory apron, stylized like a dress. In her right hand she holds a representation of polonium, in form of a small sphere with six rings orbiting it, and encased within a square frame. It is placed on a small pedestal with an inscription that reads "Maria Skłodowska-Curie". The statue has a height of 190 cm.

== See also ==
- Maria Skłodowska-Curie Monument (Ochota), another monument in Warsaw dedicated to Skłodowska-Curie
