= Halina Krahelska =

Polish writer and social activist

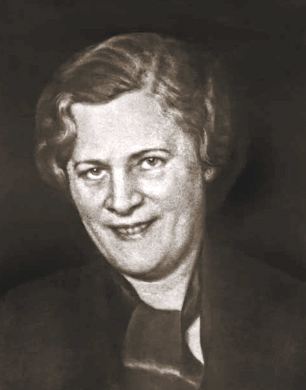
Halina Krahelska

Halina Krahelska (12 June 1892 – 1945) was a Polish activist, publicist and writer.

== Biography ==
Halina Krahelska, a member of the Polish Socialist Party, was arrested by the Russian authorities and deported to Russia, where she joined the Trudoviks and took part in the Russian Revolution of 1917. Afterwards, she returned to independent Poland, where she became a socialist activist, particularly interested in the issues of social welfare (such as maternity leave), and an activist of the Democratic Party (Poland) (SD). She also wrote novels.

During World War II, she joined the Polish resistance (Armia Krajowa). Arrested by the Germans, she was sent to the Ravensbrück concentration camp, where she wrote several works, some related to her experiences in the camp, others continuing her work as a socialist activist.

== Legacy ==
Krahelska died at the concentration camp, 1945. After the war, Polish Inspection of Labor created an award named after her.

== Personal life ==
Coming from a long family line of women patriots, Krahelska was a sister of Krystyna Krahelska, poet and resistance member who died in the Warsaw Uprising in 1944. She was also a cousin of Wanda Krahelska-Filipowicz, a leading figure in the Warsaw's underground resistance movement who was a wife of a former ambassador to Washington and who – at the age of twenty – took part in an assassination attempt on the Russian governor-general of Warsaw. She was a daughter of Jan Śleszyński.
