= William Lindley =

English engineer (1808–1900)

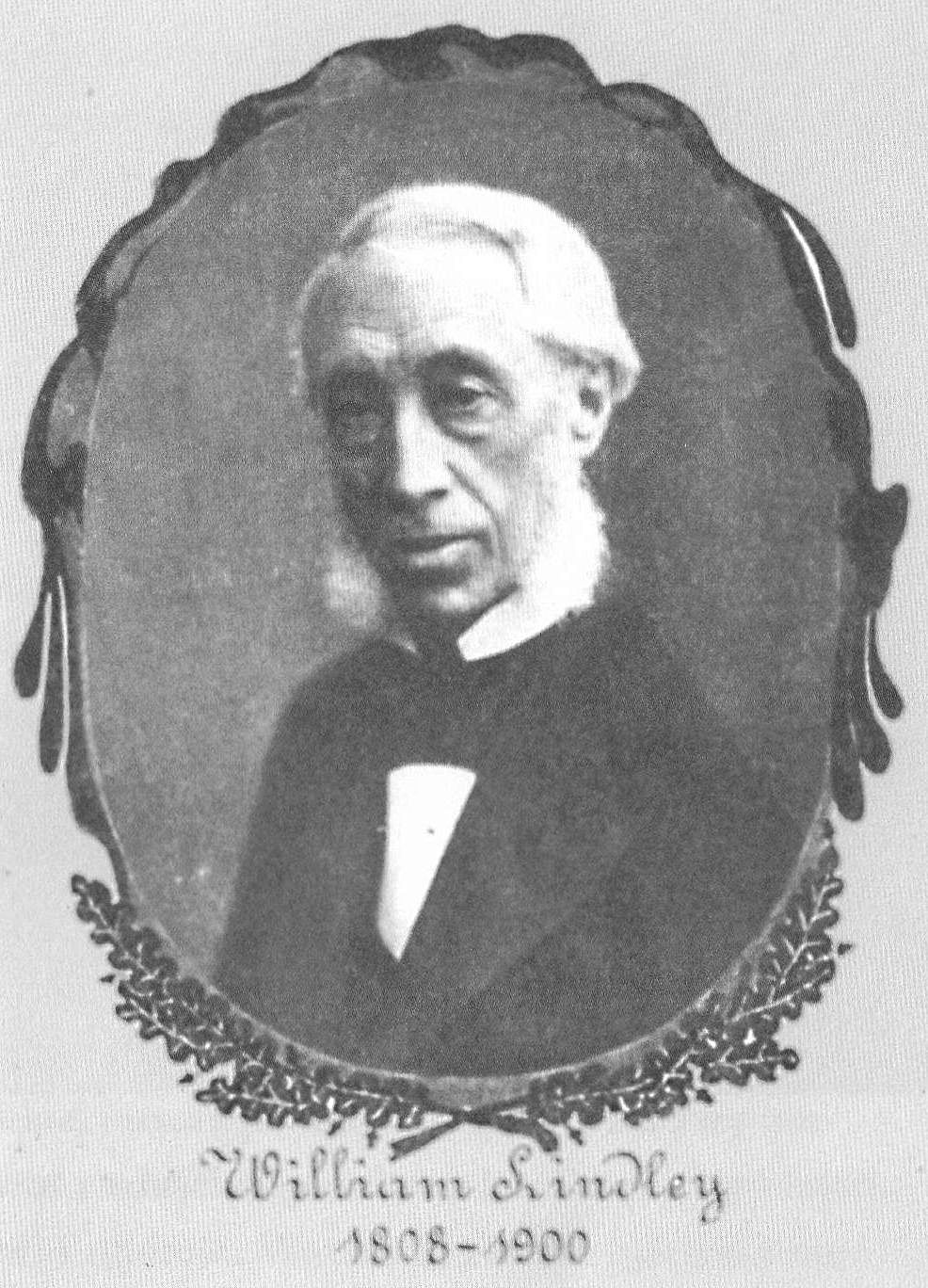
- Born: 7 September 1808; London
- Died: 22 May 1900 (aged 91); Blackheath, London
- Known for: London sanitary sewer

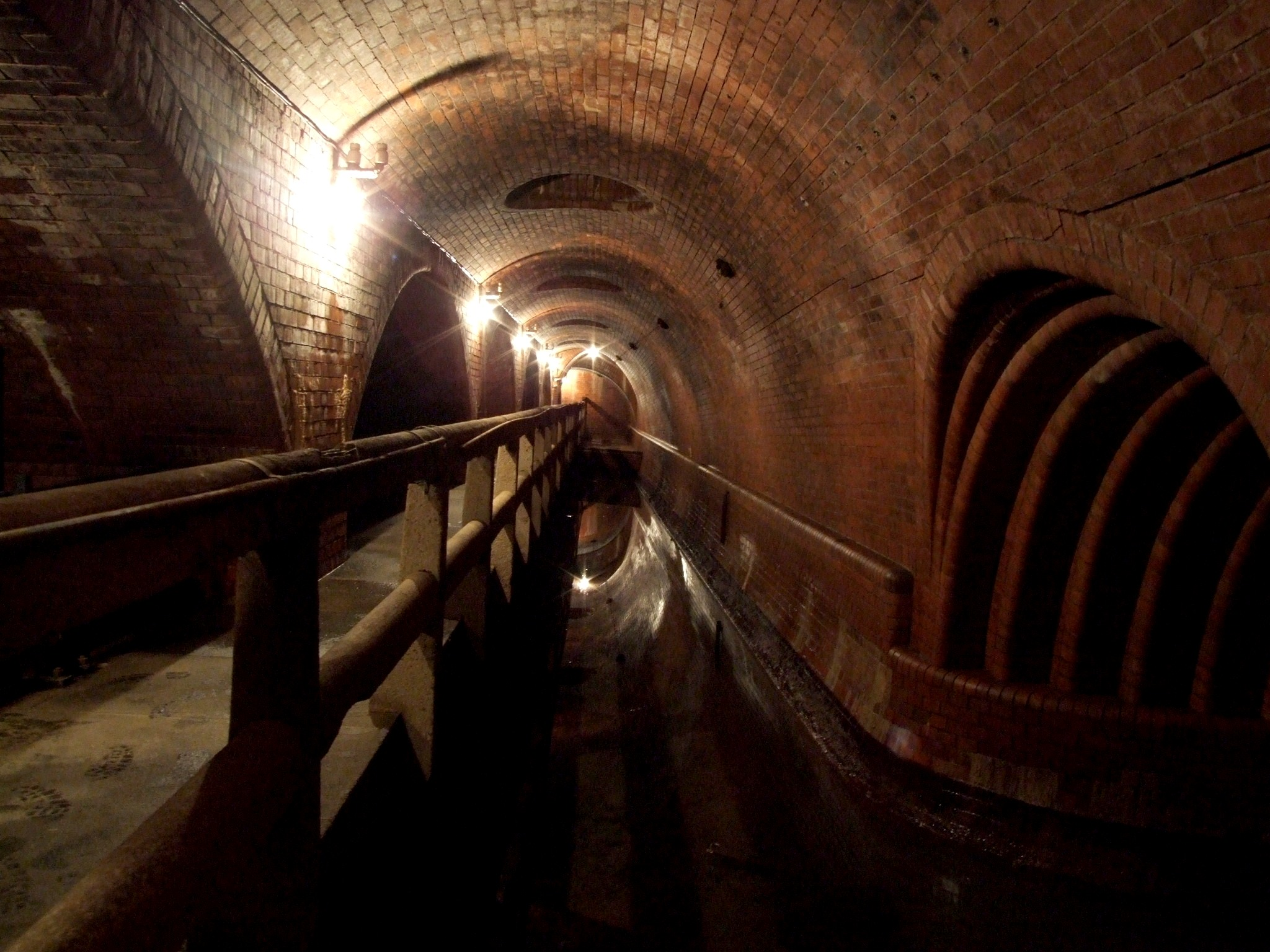
The sewers of Prague

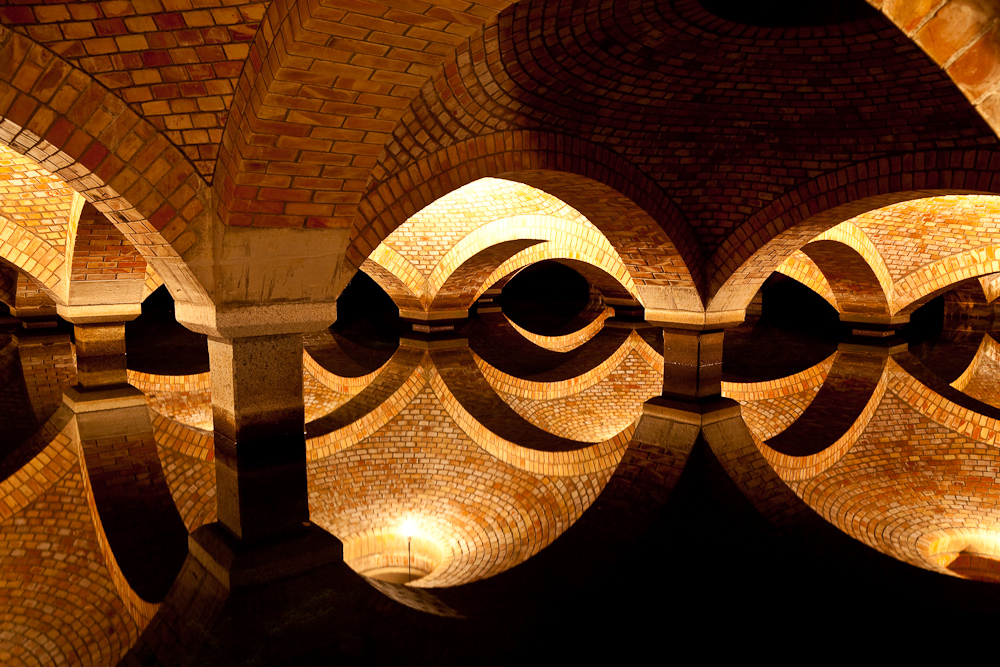
The waterworks of Warsaw

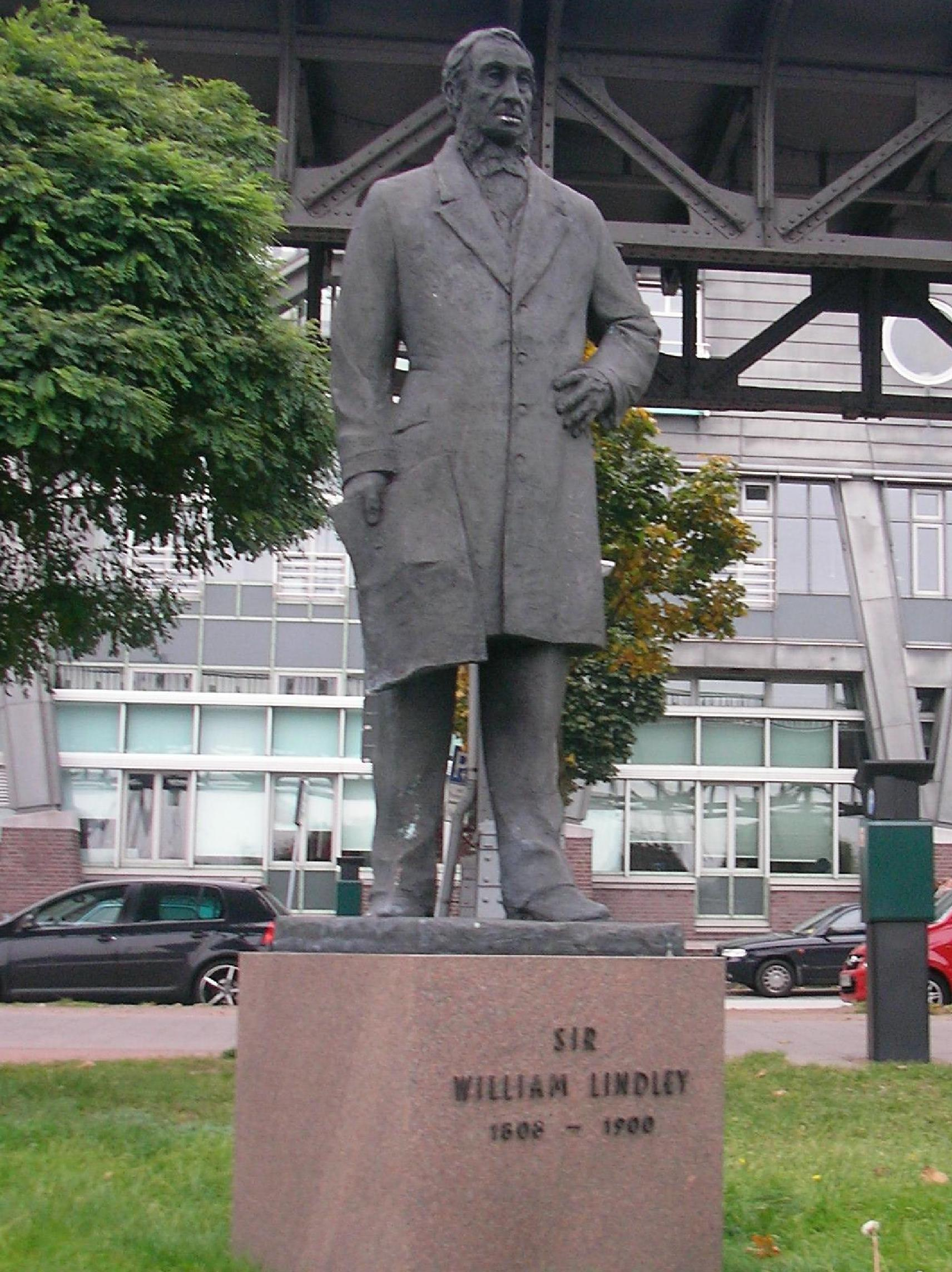
Statue of William Lindley in Hamburg-Neustadt, 2008

William Lindley (7 September 1808 – 22 May 1900) was an English engineer who together with his sons designed water and sewerage systems for over 30 cities across Europe.

== Life ==
Lindley was born in London. As a young engineer he worked together with Marc Isambard Brunel and Francis Giles. In 1834, he went to Germany as Giles' assistant to survey the railway route from Lübeck to Hamburg. A few years later, in 1838, he was commissioned to build the Hamburg-Bergedorf Railway Company (German: Hamburg-Bergedorfer Eisenbahn), the first railway line which was carried out in northern Germany. The official opening had to be cancelled as a catastrophic fire in May 1842 left a third of the town in ruins. Lindley became a member of the Technical Commission for the reconstruction of the town centre (with Alexis de Chateauneuf, Gottfried Semper and others) and designed the first fundamental plan for the reconstruction of the city. For the engineer, who had already been commissioned to design a new sewer system for Hamburg, the destruction was an opportunity to modernise the city.

His designs, influenced by English social reformer and public health inspector Edwin Chadwick, included the first underground sewers in continental Europe. Within three years 11 km of sewers had been built in Hamburg, and Lindley began work on a waterworks to supply the city with drinking water. In the following years he helped design and build water systems in a number of other German cities and towns such as Altona, Stralsund and Leipzig.

At Hamburg, Lindley developed an increasing interest in urban planning. In 1840, he was commissioned to drain the Hammerbrook marshes, east of the town centre of Hamburg. This drainage system, which was implemented by the construction of a grid of canals connected by locks with the Elbe river (1842–47), provided the basis of the first modern suburb at Hamburg, primarily as an industrial area. In 1855 he also designed an early master plan for the development of the areas west of the town centre. However, as his design for the Hamburg harbour (1845, with James Walker and Heinrich Hübbe) was used, the plan was not carried out.

Due to the re-organisation of the Hamburg building authorities he gave up his position as a consultant of the Baudeputation in 1860, and moved with his family to London, including his three young sons – William Heerlein Lindley (born 1853), Robert Searles Lindley (born 1854) and Joseph Lindley (born 1859). In 1863, he began work on the sewerage system of Frankfurt am Main, the benefits of which became apparent as between 1868 and 1883 the death rate from typhoid fell from 80 to 10 per 100,000 inhabitants.

Lindley's designs were in demand across Europe, and together with his sons he built systems for cities in Germany (including Düsseldorf) and elsewhere, including Saint Petersburg, Budapest, Prague and Moscow. In 1876, the Australian city of Sydney even asked him to design a sewer system for them, but he turned them down, as he had just been commissioned by Warsaw in Poland.

Between 1876 and 1878, he designed the Warsaw waterworks, which were constructed between 1881 and 1889 under the direction of his son, William Heerlein Lindley. To this day, there is a street in Warsaw named after him, which goes around the historical waterworks. Also named after the Lindleys' handiwork is "Filter Street" (ulica Filtrowa). As a sidenote, the system that William Lindley designed for Warsaw is still operational, and the last sewer collector of his design was not replaced until 2001.

He died in May 1900 in Blackheath, London, aged 91.

== Memorials ==
- Lindley memorial is located in Hamburg near underground station Baumwall at the entrance to sewage system, 53.544198°N 9.979411°E
- An exhibition to celebrate his 200th birthday took place from 2008 to 2009 in the hamburgmuseum, Hamburg: "Designer of the modern city. William Lindley in Hamburg and Europe (1808–1900)".
- The small "Lindleystraße" in Hamburg's Rothenburgsort.
- "Lindleystraße" in Frankfurt am Main's Osthafen district, on which is located a hotel named "Das Lindley Lindenberg".
- An English Heritage Blue Plaque commemorating William Lindley and his son Sir William Heerlein Lindley was unveiled on 22 April 2015 at 74 Shooters Hill Road, London SE3 7BG.
- A memorial bench to Lindley and his sons is located in Multimedialny Fountain Park, near the Old Town in Warsaw, Poland. The bench is fashioned out of water pipes, with a statue of Lindley standing next to it, his hand turning a stopcock.
