= Krystyna Krahelska =

Resistance fighter and Polish poet

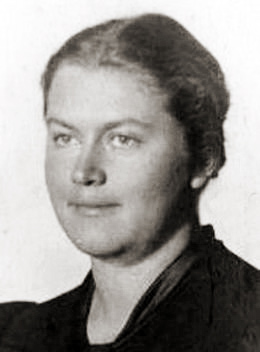
Krystyna Krahelska (1938)

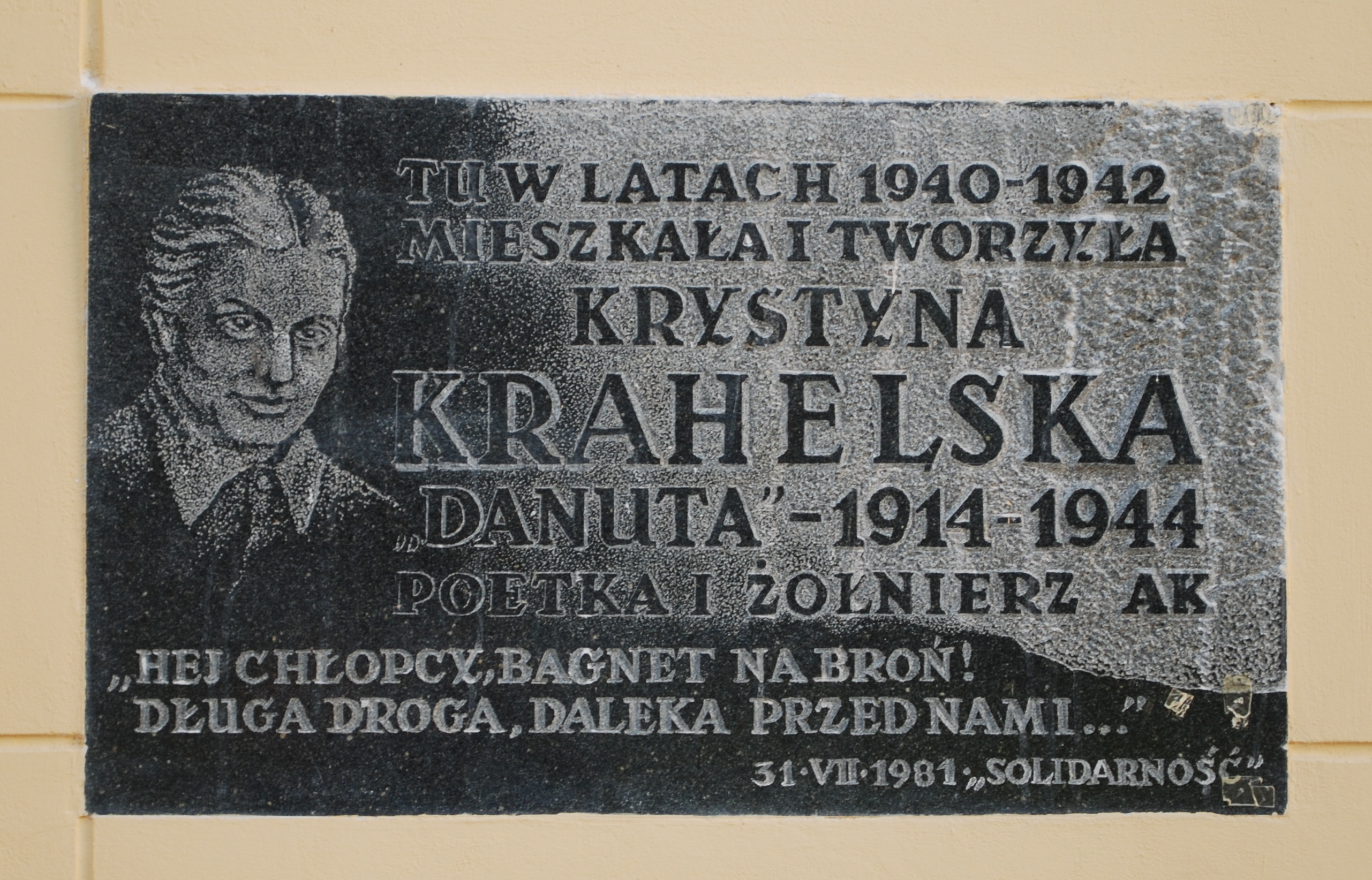
Memorial plaque at the Czartoryski Palace in Warsaw

Krystyna Krahelska "Danuta" (24 March 1914 – 2 August 1944) was a Polish poet, ethnographer, member of the Home Army, and a participant in the Warsaw Uprising.

== Life ==
She was born in a family estate in Mazurki near Baranovichi in the Russian Empire (now Belarus). Her family was a typical family of intellectuals. Her father, Jan Krahelski, was an engineer then later a Polish Army officer, and the voivode of Polesie from 1926 to 1932. Her mother was Janina Bury, a biologist. She was the niece of Wanda Krahelska-Filipowicz (one of the participants in the assassination attempt on the Russian Governor General Georgi Skalon) and the cousin of the husband of Halina Krahelska.

She joined the Polish Scouting Association in 1928, and from 1929 to 1932 led a band of scouts. In 1931, she participated in the Slavic Scouts Rally in Prague as the member of the Polish delegation. In 1932 she graduated from Romuald Traugutt junior high school in Brześć nad Bugiem.

From October 1932, she studied at the University of Warsaw, studying geography, history and ethnography at the Faculty of Humanities. During that time, she was a ward of Cezaria Jędrzejewiczowa. She performed songs on Polish Radio Wilno and Polish Radio Warsaw. In May 1939, she passed her final examination. From 1936 to 1937, she posed for Ludwika Nitschowa, sculptor of one of the statues of the Warsaw Mermaid.

In September 1939, Warsaw was attacked by Nazi Germany. During the occupation, she lived in Warsaw and worked at the National Institute of Agricultural Cultivation. She was a messenger and courier for special tasks into Nowogródek region. From 1943 to 1944 she transported weapons, trained in medicine and she worked as a nurse in the local hospital in Włodawa. As a nurse, she trained girls for medical service.

From May 1943, again in Warsaw and during the Warsaw Uprising, she was assigned as a nurse in 1108 platoon (commander: Lieutenant Karol Wróblewski ps. "Wron") in the 3rd company of the 1st Squadron, "Jeleń" ("Deer") of the 7th Lublin Cavalry Regiment AK under the pseudonym of "Danuta". On August 1, a platoon conducted an attack on the building of the House of Press, Marszałkowska Street 3/5 (containing the editorial office and printing house of the "Nowy Kurier Warszawski"). She was rescuing a wounded colleague when she was shot three times in the chest. She was operated on at the insurgents' hospital at Polna 34, but as a result of her wounds, she died on the morning of August 2.

She was buried in the garden house at ul. Polna 36. After the war her ashes were transferred to the Służew Old Cemetery on Renety Street.

Posthumously, she was promoted to the rank of army sergeant and awarded several medals.

== Works ==
She wrote poems and songs for most of her life. The most famous of her poems was "Hej chłopcy, bagnet na broń" ("Hey Boys, Bayonet on the Gun"), written in January 1943 for the soldiers of underground "Baszta" Battalion. It became the most popular song of Polish underground and the Warsaw Uprising. The text was first published in the underground magazine "Bądź Gotów" ("Be Ready") (November 20, 1943 No. 21), and reprinted several times in the insurgent press. In addition, it was published in two underground anthologies: "Pieśni podziemne" (1944) and "Śpiewnik BCh" (October 1944), and in many war anthologies.

During the occupation, two of her poems were known and widely sung: the song "Kołysanka" ("Lullaby") written in 1941–1942; alternate title: "Kołysanka o zakopanej broni" ("Lullaby of Buried Weapons") and "Kujawiak", also known as "Kujawiak konspiracyjny ("Kujawiak Conspiratorial"), "Kujawiak partyzancki" ("Kujawiak of Partisans").

After the war, two collections of her poems and songs were published, including "Smutna rzeka" ("Sad River") and "Wiersze: ("Poems").

Her texts have been used by Aga Zaryan in her album "Umiera piękno" ("The Beauty Dies").
