= William Heerlein Lindley =

British civil engineer (1853–1917)

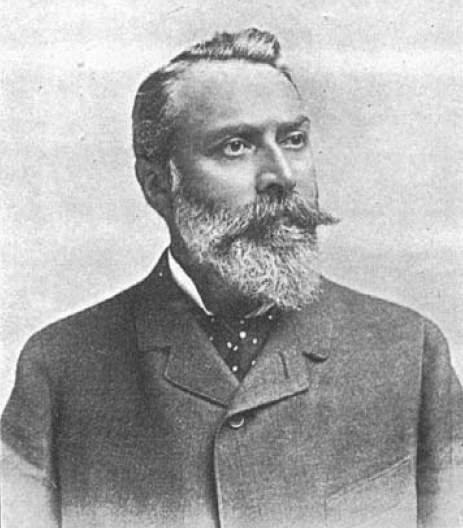
- William Heerlein Lindley
- Born: 30 January 1853; Hamburg, Germany
- Died: 30 December 1917 (aged 64); London, U.K.
- Occupation: Civil engineer
- Relatives: William Lindley (father)

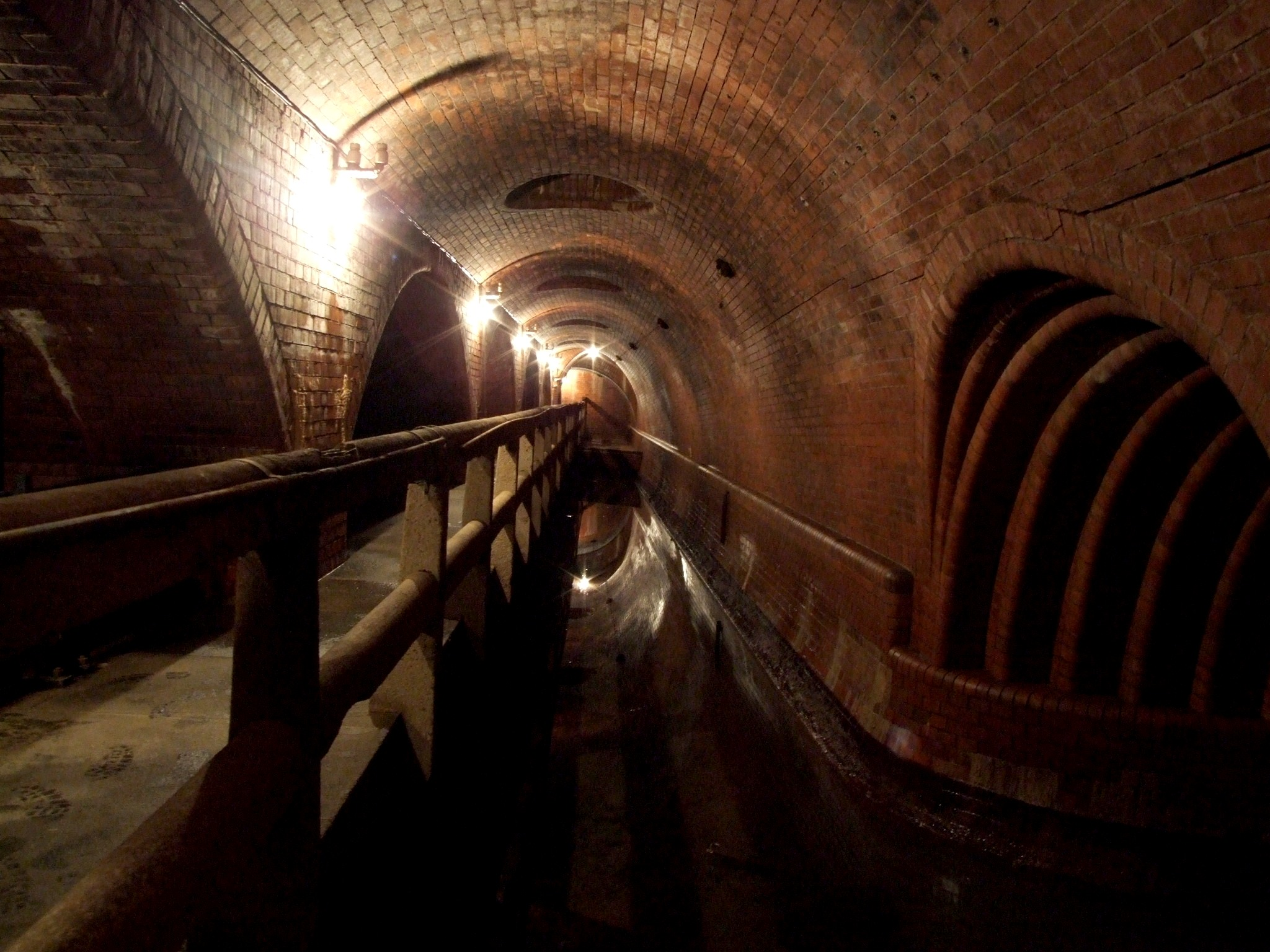
Prague's sewage works designed by Lindley

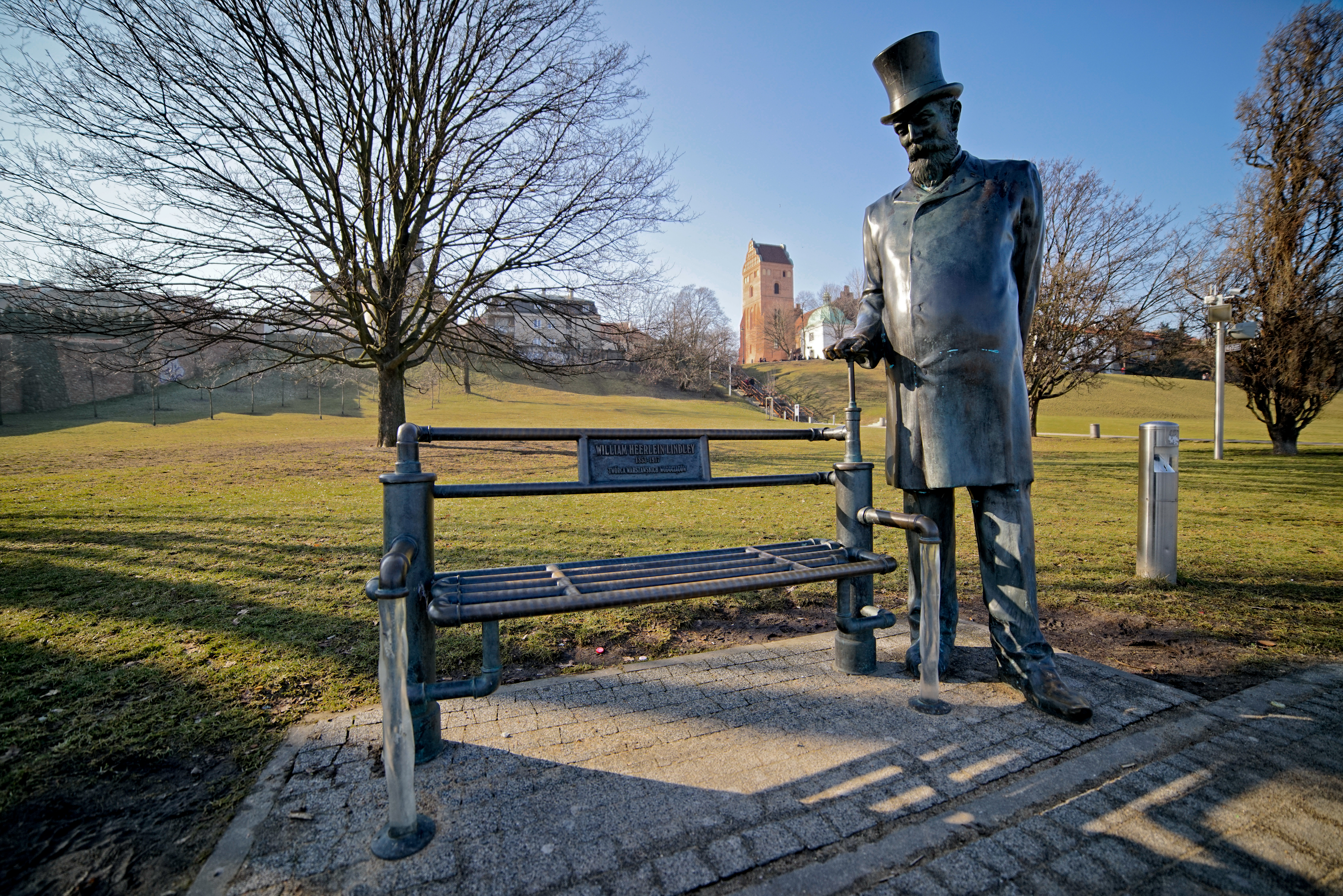
Statue of William H. Lindley, Warsaw

Sir William Heerlein Lindley (30 January 1853, in Hamburg – 30 December 1917, in London) was a British civil engineer.

One of three sons of the famous British engineer William Lindley, WH Lindley worked together with his father on a number of projects and was a respected engineer in his own right. Between 1881 and 1889 he oversaw the construction of Warsaw waterworks, designed by his father in 1876–1878. He oversaw the construction of the sewage system in Prague, built between 1895 and 1906, which is still in use today, and Sewage plant in Bubeneč in Prague, which was in use from 1907 until 1967 and currently its building serves as a museum of Prague's sewage system and is highly dedicated to Lindley. Between 1897 and 1898 he worked on the project for a water-supply system for Iași, which he linked, via an underground cast-iron aqueduct, to an aquifer located 103 kilometres away, in Timișești, Neamț County; Lindley's project was materialised in 1911, and the water system is still used. He also coordinated the project for Baku's water supply system, working from 1899 up until his death in 1917. In 1909 he also designed a water and sewerage system for Łódź, Poland, although the expense of the system meant the project was shelved until the 1920s.

== Literature ==
- Jaroslav Jásek: William Heerlein Lindley a pražská kanalizace (William Heerlein Lindley and sewage works in Prague), Scriptorium, Prague, 2006, ISBN 80-86197-65-4. A Czech language monograph.
- Franz Lerner, William Heerlein Lindley (1853–1917). Umriss seines Lebens von Franz Lerner, in: Archiv für Frankfurts Geschichte und Kunst, Heft 49, Frankfurt am Main 1965, s. 123–133.
- The Dictionary of National Biography, Oxford University Press, 2004, Vol. 33
- Ryszard Żelichowski, Lindleyowie. Dzieje inżynierskiego rodu (The Lindleys. Works of a family of engineers), Warszawa 2002, ISBN 83-88794-91-4
