= Ludwika Nitschowa =

Polish sculptor (1889–1989)

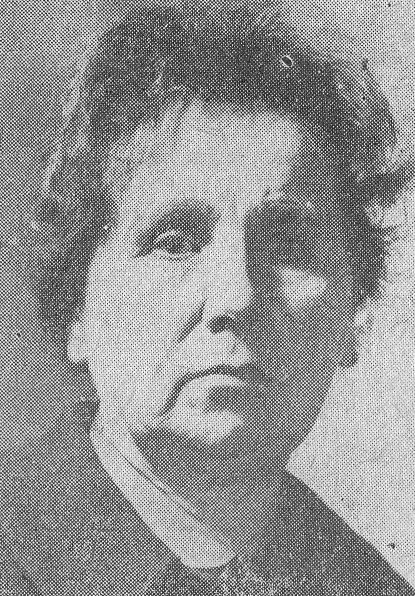
- Born: Ludwika Kraskowski; 6 December 1889; Radłów, Poland
- Died: 28 March 1989 (aged 99); Warsaw, Poland
- Known for: Sculpture, paintings
- Spouse: Roman Nitsch

Ludwika Nitschowa (6 December 1889 – 28 March 1989) was a Polish sculptor, painter and art teacher. She is well known in Poland for her sculptures of Marie Curie and the Mermaid of Warsaw.

== Early life and education ==
Nitschowa was born on 6 December 1889, in Radłów in southern Poland. She was the daughter of Jerzy Kraskowski, who was one of the insurrectionists in the 1863 January Uprising against the Russian Empire), and Maria Kraskowski (née Wendorff), who was an artist and painter. After graduating from high school, she studied privately with the painter, Leon Wyczółkowski, in Kraków for two years. From 1909 to 1912, she studied at the Maria Niedzielska School of Fine Arts for Women in Kraków. In 1918 and 1919, she lived in Paris. From 1920 to 1926, she studied sculpture at the Academy of Fine Arts, Warsaw in the studio of the sculptor, Tadeusz Breyer. She married Roman Nitsch, a serologist and bacteriologist professor at the Jagiellonian University and the University of Warsaw.

== Career ==
In 1927, with a group of Breyer's students, Nitschowa founded the Forma Association of Sculptors, which fulfilled commissions for tombstones, church sculptures, and architectural sculptures. She held her first exhibitions of paintings and sculptures at the Zachęta National Gallery of Art in Warsaw in 1929 and 1930. According to her, in the 1929 exhibition she was criticised for essentially sculpting in her painting. She later exhibited at the Institute of Art Propaganda (from 1930 to 1937). In the 1930s, she was a member of the board of the Professional Association of Sculptors and, from 1945, a member of the Association of Polish Visual Artists. In February 1937 she was among those to exhibit in Les femmes artistes d'Europe, the first international all-woman art show in France, held at the Jeu de Paume in Paris. Her works were also presented at the 1939 New York World's Fair.

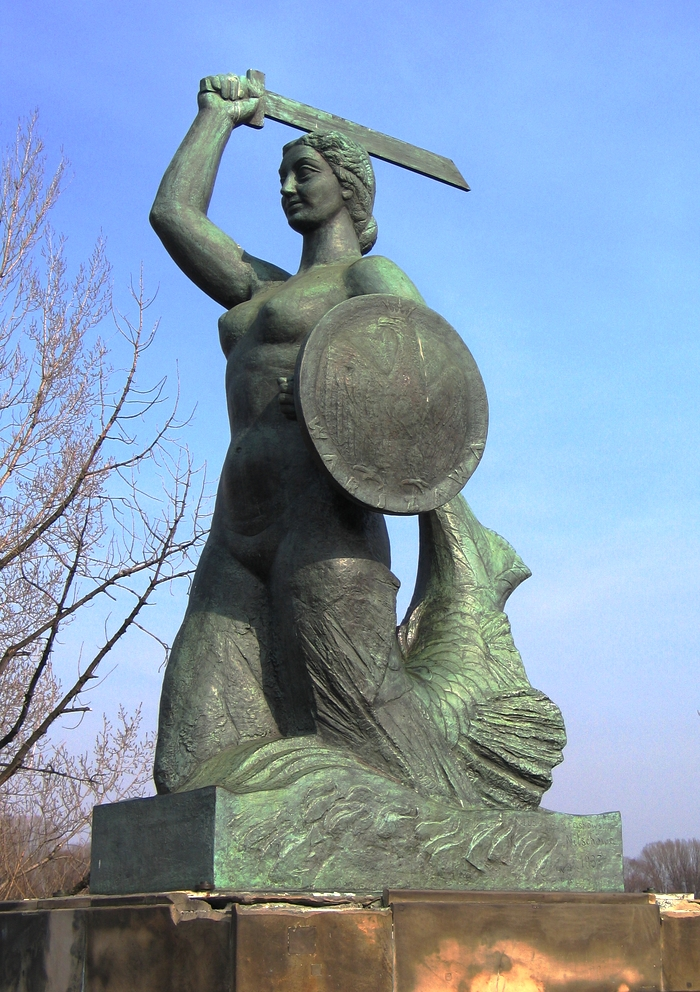
Nitschowa's Mermaid monument

She remained in Warsaw during World War II (1939–1945). In 1950, she began working at the Faculty of Sculpture at the Academy of Fine Arts. In 1956, she was appointed associate professor and later became a full professor. She served as head of the sculpture department and deputy dean of the faculty, with her students including the sculptor Gustaw Zemła. She retired in 1962.

Throughout her career, Nitschowa sculpted in various mediums, including stone, bronze, plaster, ceramics, and wood. She also painted in oils and watercolours. Her sculptures, generally of the human figure, which include monumental sculptures, are to be found in many public collections, both nationally and internationally. Her first sculpture after graduating was of Marie Curie, the winner of the 1903 Nobel Prize in Physics, together with her husband Pierre Curie, for their research into radioactivity. The statue is now to be found in the Polish Museum of America in Chicago. The Mermaid monument in Powiśle, Warsaw was originally planned to be a 20-metre-tall sculpture of a mermaid made from green glass, placed on a column in the middle of the Vistula river. However, this turned out to be expensive and difficult to assemble. Instead, it was decided to make a smaller traditional sculpture that would be placed on the shore. A model of the sculpture was presented in May 1937, at the 1st All-Poland Sculpture Salon at the Art Propaganda Institute in Warsaw. It was the largest object at the exhibition. Although Nitschowa would not initially name the model she used for the statue, she later said that it was the poet Krystyna Krahelska.

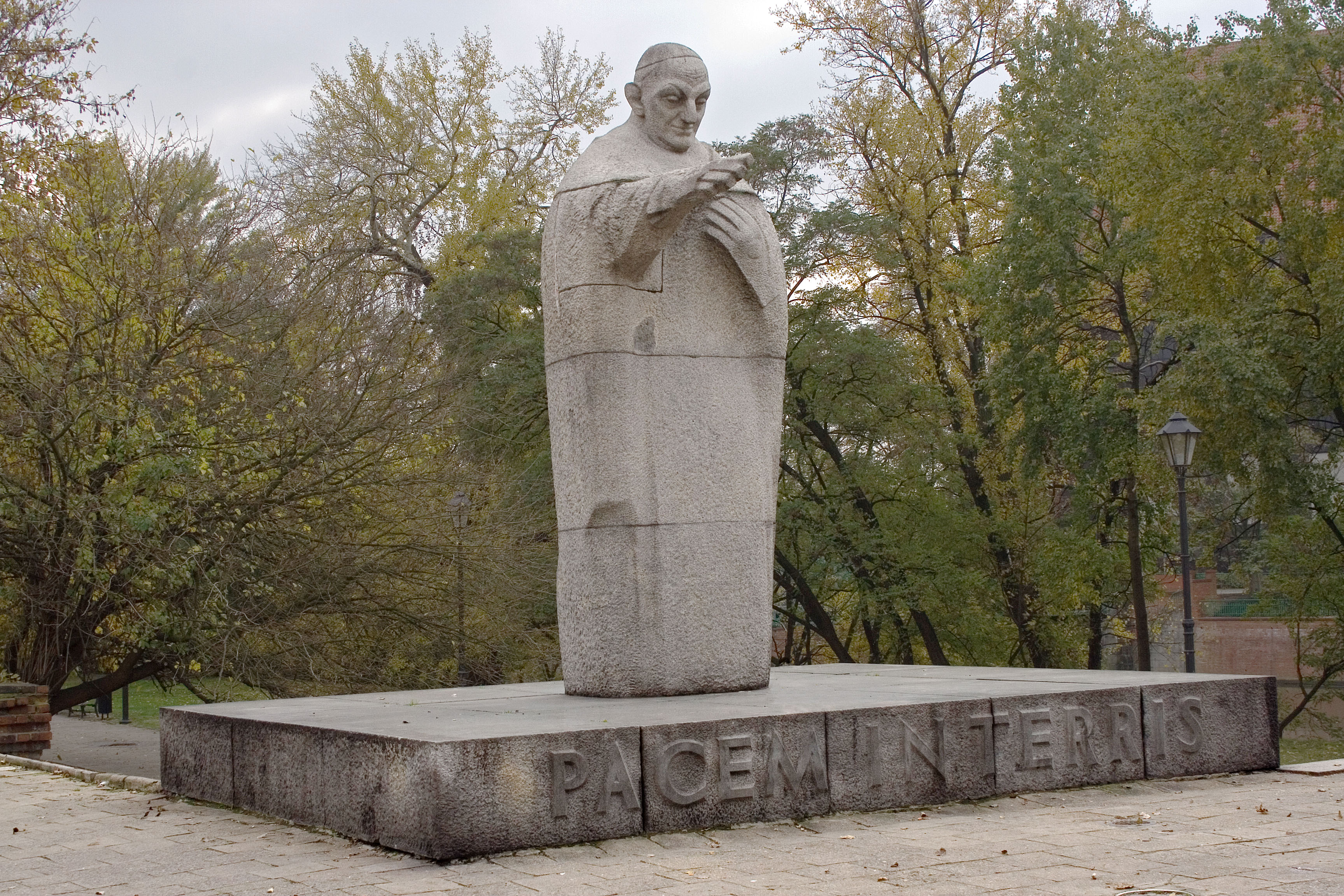
Statue of Pope John XXIII

In 1955 Nitschowa produced a stone statue of the Polish astronomer Nicolaus Copernicus for the Palace of Culture and Science in Warsaw. In 1967 her statue of Stefan Starzyński, the mayor of Warsaw in 1939 during the German invasion, was unveiled at the Zachęta gallery before being placed in Saxon Garden, the oldest public park in Warsaw. It was later moved to Saska Street in Warsaw. A statue by Nitschowa of Pope John XXIII was unveiled in Wrocław in 1968. In 1973 she produced a bust of Copernicus in bronze, which is at the Brussels Planetarium in Belgium, and in the same year her statue of the pianist and composer, Frédéric Chopin, was unveiled at the Royal Northern College of Music in Manchester, England to commemorate the 125th anniversary of a performance given in Manchester by Chopin.

== Death ==
Nitschowa died in Warsaw on 28 March 1989 and was buried at the Powązki Cemetery (plot 345, straight-1-5).
