= List of Romanesque buildings =

Listed below are examples of surviving buildings in Romanesque style in Europe, sorted by modern day countries.

== List ==
=== Austria ===
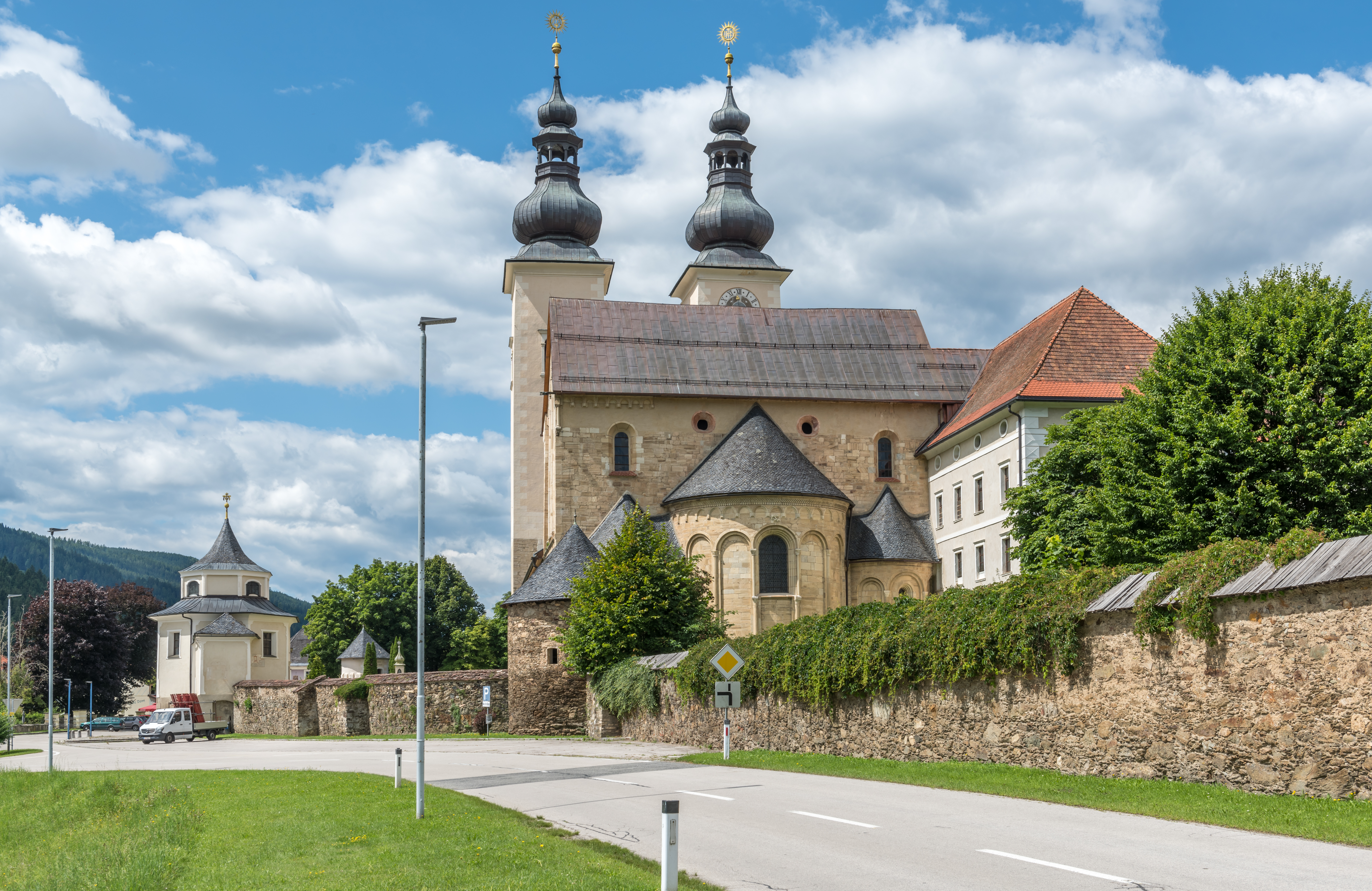
Gurk Cathedral, Carinthia

- Gurk Cathedral, Gurk, Carinthia
- Ossiach Abbey, Ossiach, Carinthia
- Virgilkapelle, Vienna
- Millstatt Abbey, Millstatt, Carinthia
- Schöngrabern Church, Hollabrunn, Lower Austria

=== Belgium ===
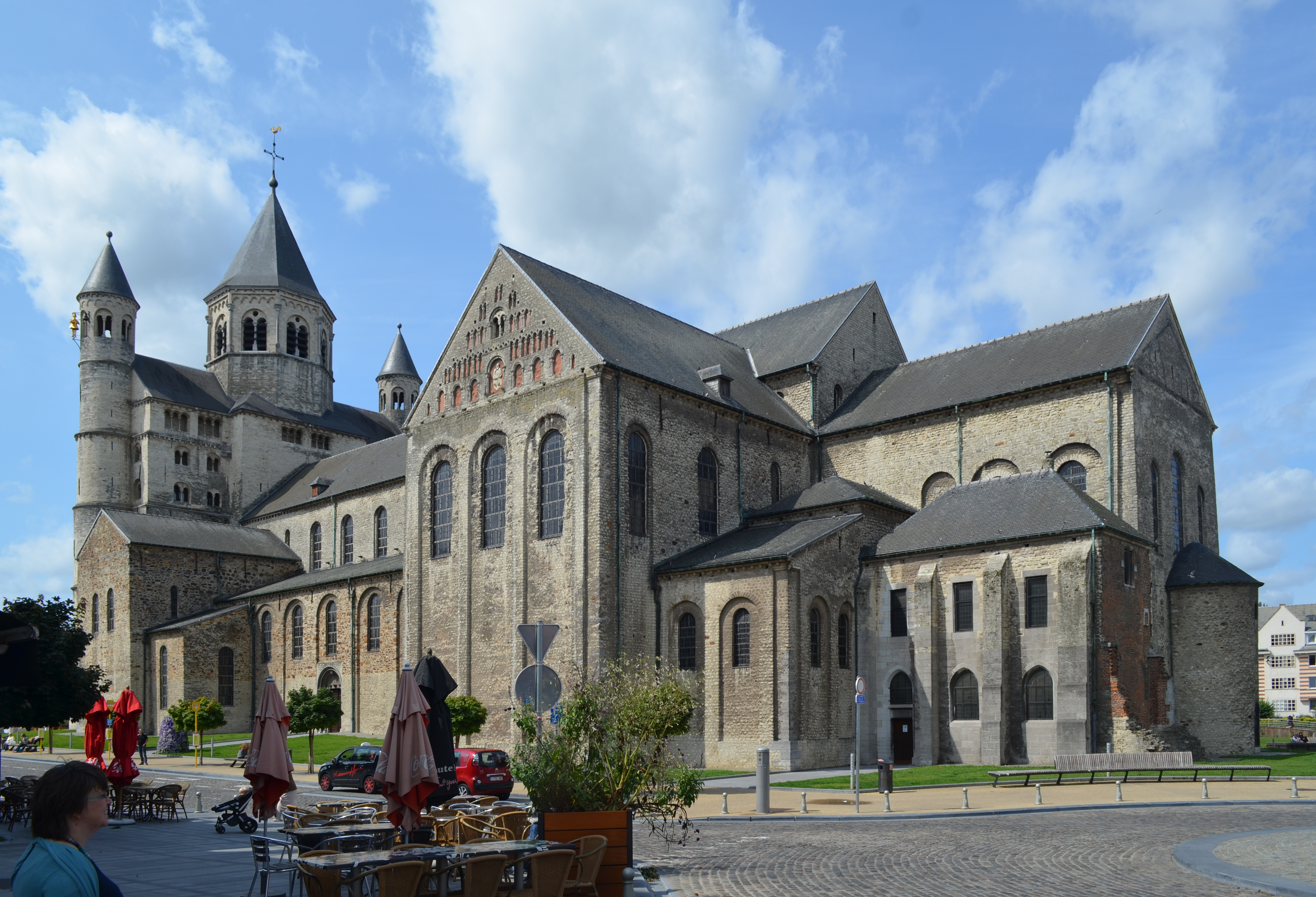
Collegiate Church of Saint Gertrude, Nivelles

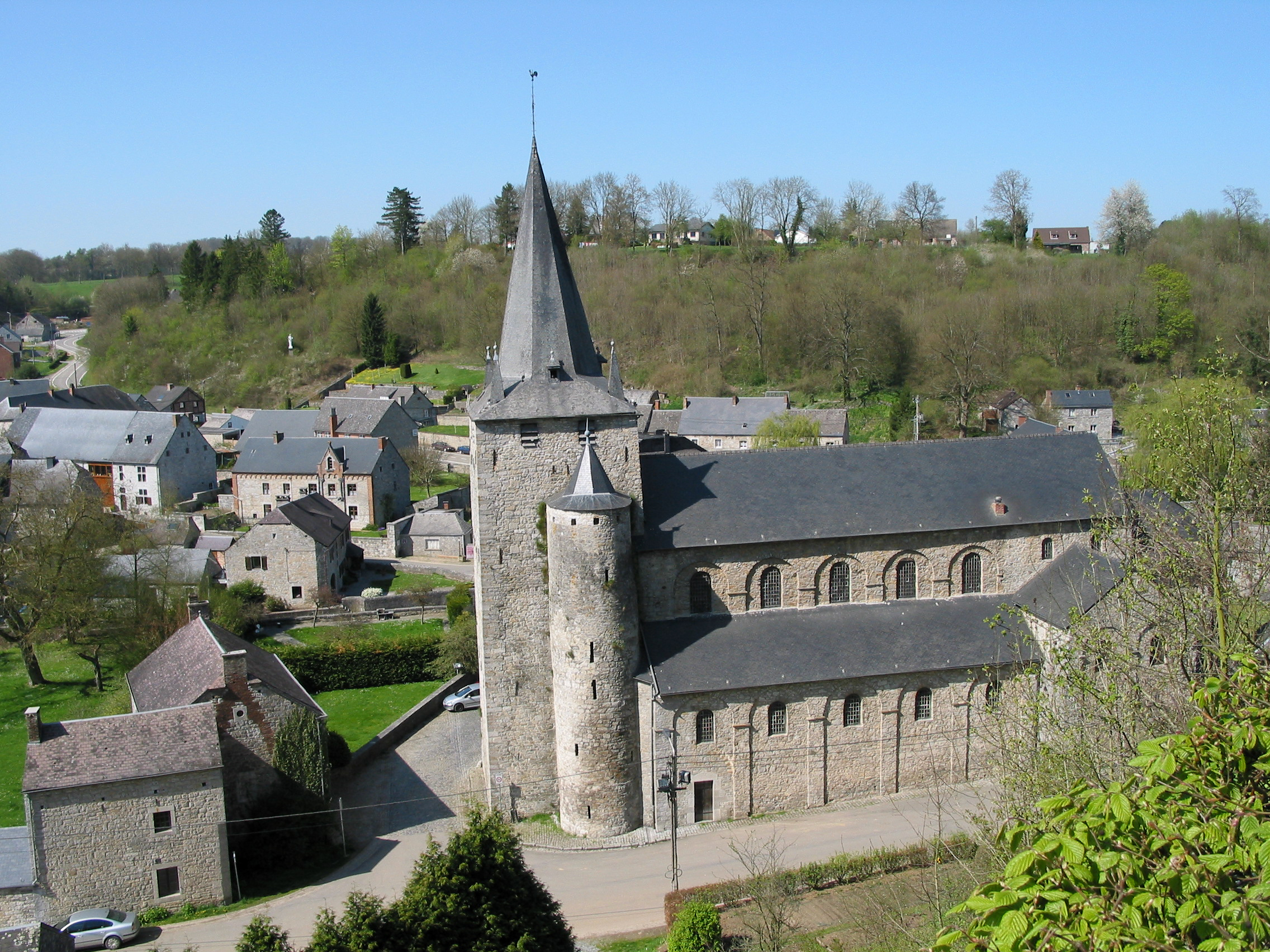
Collegiate Church of Saint Hadelin, Celles

- Tournai Cathedral in Tournai
- Abbey Church of Saint Peter, Hastière, Hastière
- Collegiate Church of Saint Bartholomew, Liège
- Collegiate Church of Saint Gertrude in Nivelles
- Collegiate Church of Saint Hadelin, Celles
- Collegiate Church of Saint Ursmer, Lobbes
- Collegiate Church of Saint-Vincent, Soignies
- Church of Saint James, Ghent
- Church of Saint Giles, Liège
- Church of Saint Remaclus, Ocquier
- Church of Saint Peter and Saint Paul, Nandrin
- Church of Saint Quentin, Tournai
- Church of Saint Peter, Xhignesse

=== Croatia ===
- St. Anastasia, Zadar
- St. Benedict, Split
- St. Peter, Rab
- St. Mary the Blessed, Rab

=== Czech Republic ===
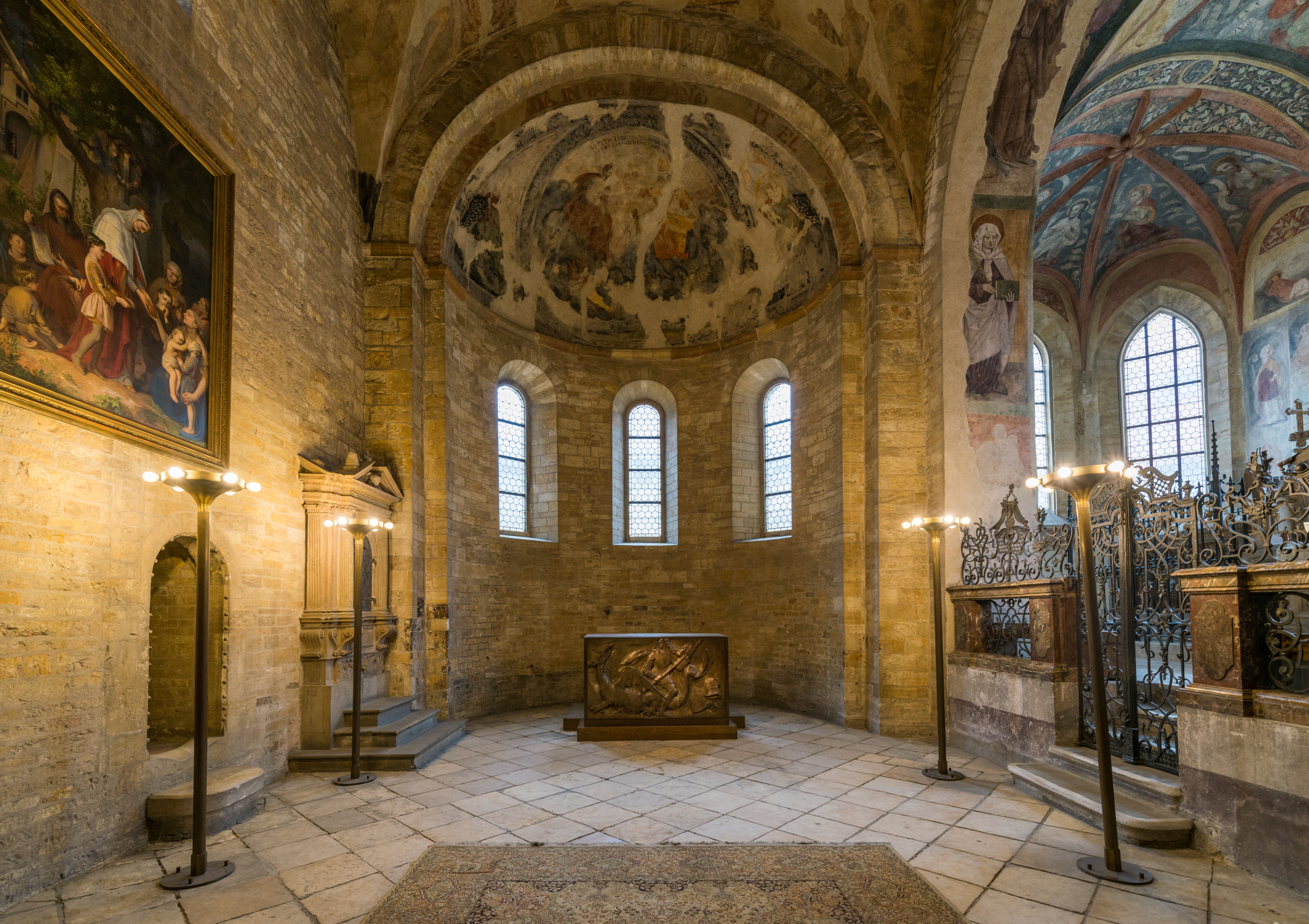
St. George's Basilica, Prague

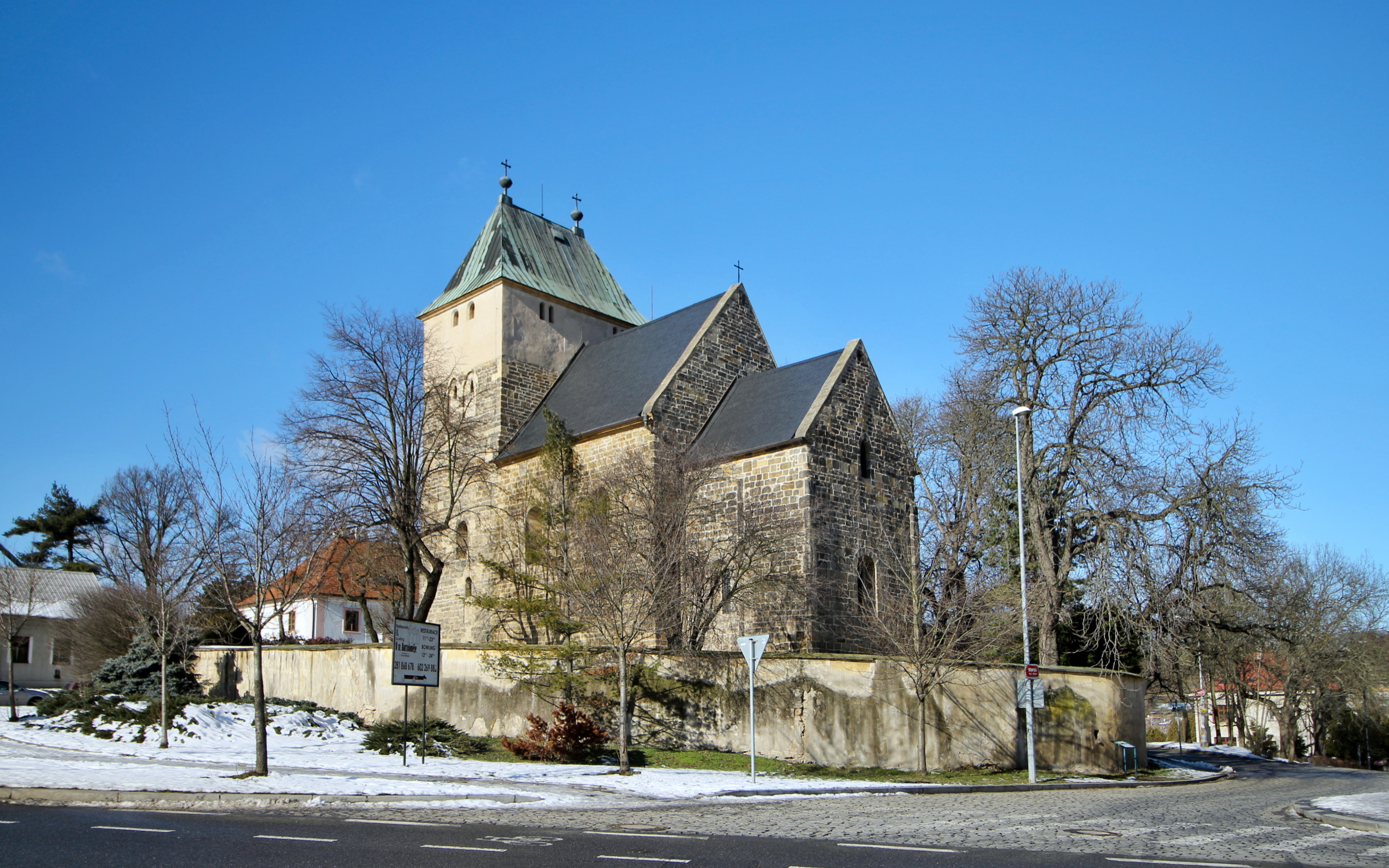
St. Bartholomew's Church in Prague-Kyje

- St. Longin's Rotunda in Prague
- Rotunda of the Finding of the Holy Cross in Prague
- St. George's Basilica, Prague (Bazilika svatého Jiří, Praha)
- St. Bartholomew's Church in Prague-Kyje
- St. George's Rotunda on Říp
- Castle and rotunda in Týnec nad Sázavou
- St. Peter and Paul (Petr a Pavel) Church in Poříčí nad Sázavou
- St. Jacob's (Jakub) Church in Cirkvice (near Kutná Hora)
- St. Procopius Basilica in Třebíč
- St. Peter's Rotunda in Starý Plzenec
- St. Peter and Paul Rotunda in Budeč (near Zákolany u Kladna)
- Rotunda of the Virgin Mary and St. Catherine in Znojmo
- St. Martin's Rotunda in Vyšehrad, Prague
- St. Catherine's Rotunda in Česká Třebová
- Basilica of the Assumption of the Virgin Mary in Tismice (near Český Brod)
- St. Bartholomew's Church in Kondrac (near Vlašim)
- Basilica of the Visitation of Our Lady, Premonstratensian Monastery in Milevsko
- Zdík's Palace (Zdíkův palác) in Olomouc
- Landštejn Castle, Landštejn
- Rotunda of St Wenceslaus, Malá Strana

=== France ===
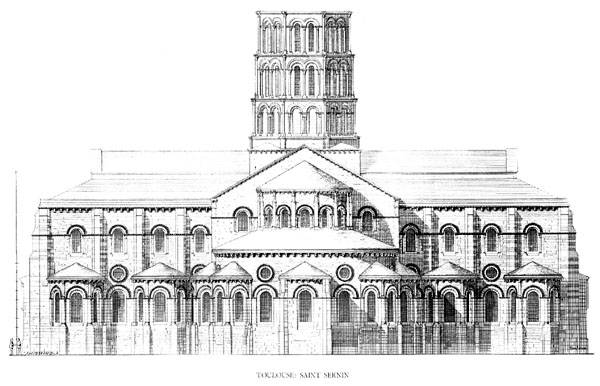
St-Sernin basilica, Toulouse, 1080 – 1120: elevation of the east end

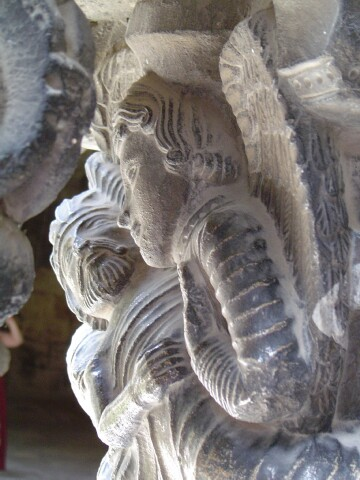
Romanesque sculpture, cloister of St. Trophime, Arles

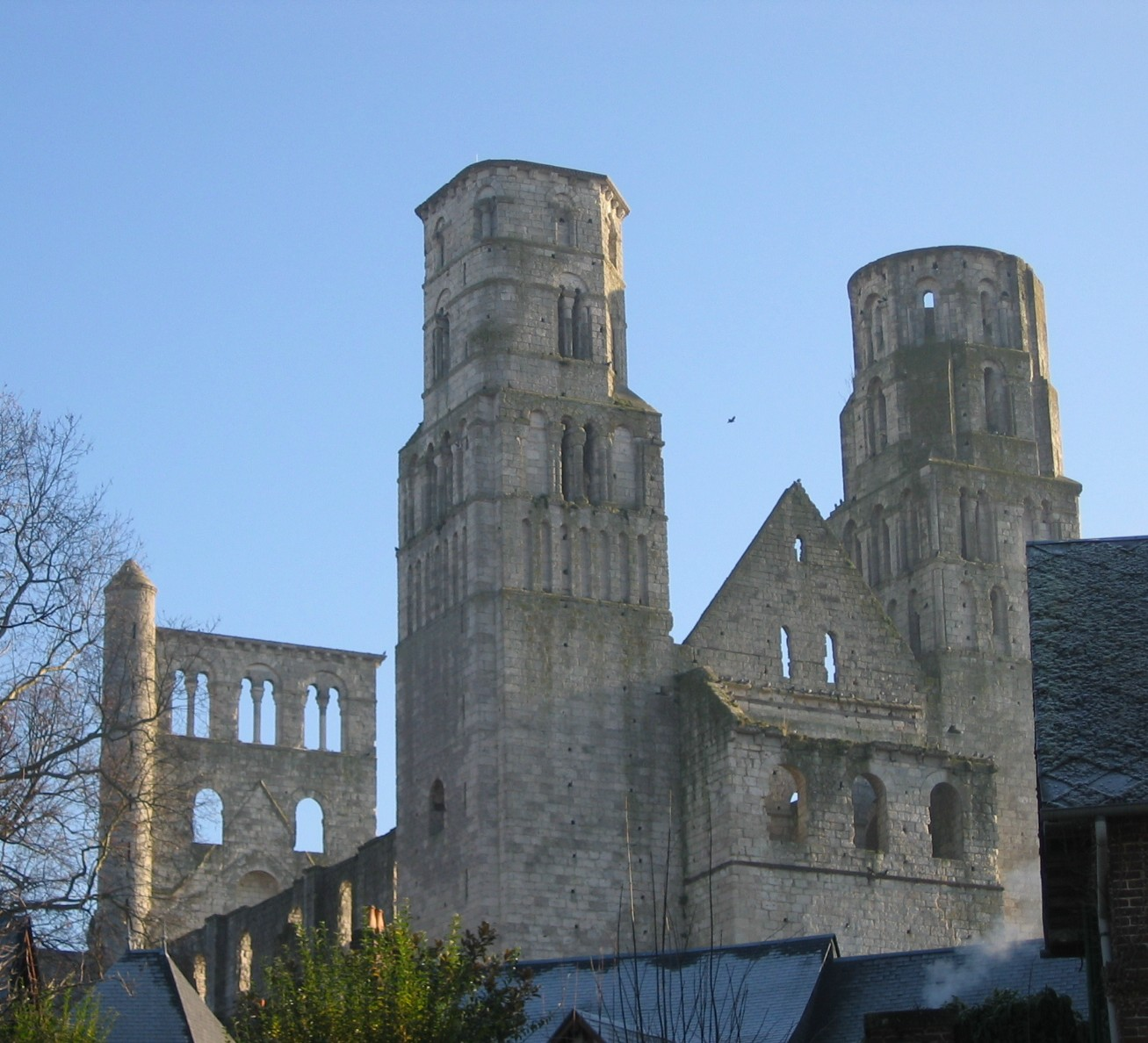
Romanesque abbey church of Jumièges, Normandy

Romanesque architecture expands in France through monasteries. Burgundy was the center of monastic life in France - one of the most important Benedictine monasteries of medieval Europe was located in Cluny. Pilgrimages also contributed to expansion of this style. Many pilgrims passed through France on their way to Santiago de Compostela.

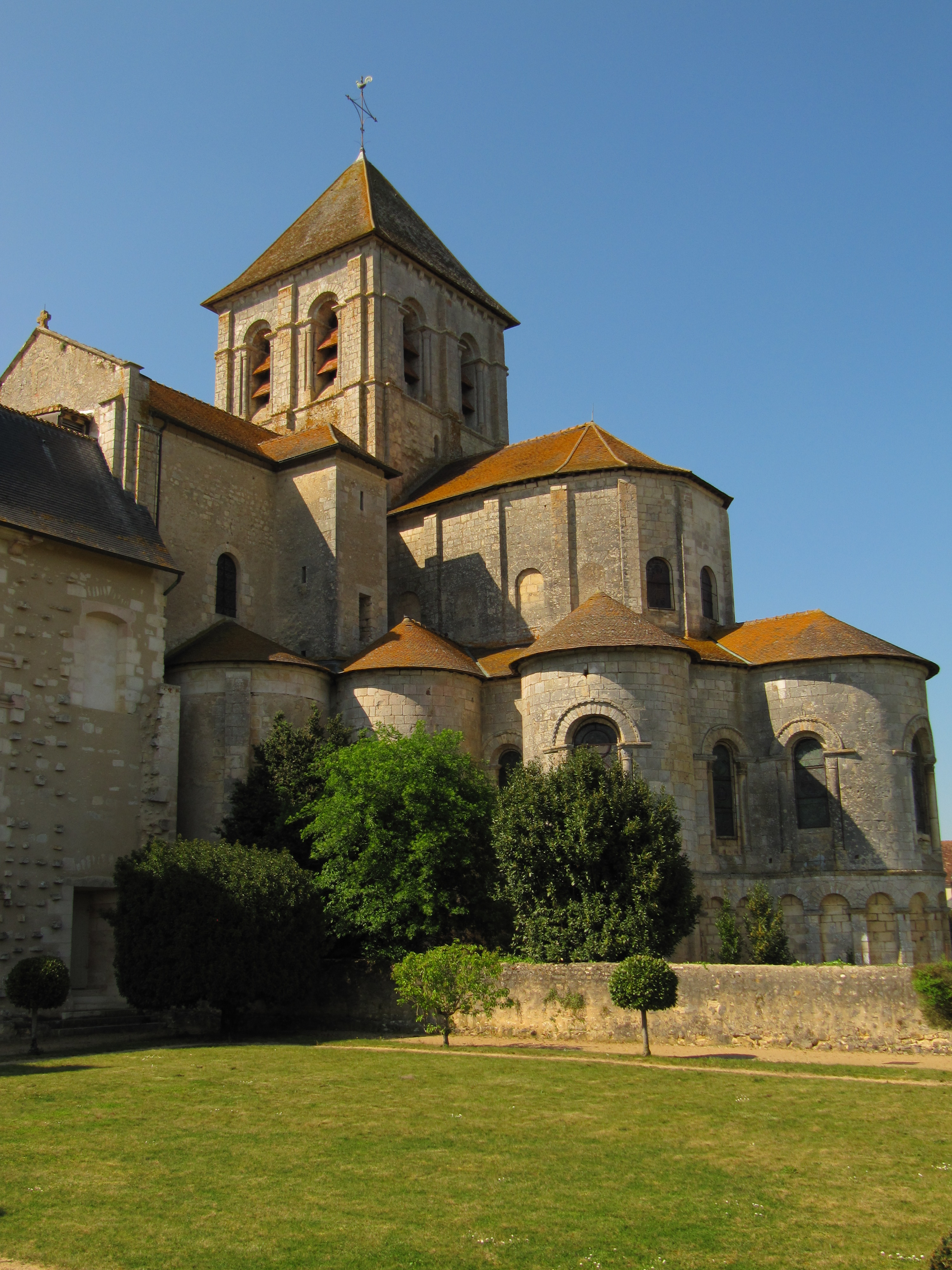
Abbey Church of Saint-Savin-sur-Gartempe

French Romanesque schools of architecture, which are specific for every region, are characterised by the variety of stone vaulting.

- Regions that developed distinctive styles are:
- Burgundy
  - abbey church, Cluny
  - Saint-Bénigne, Dijon
  - Autun
  - St Philibert at Tournus
- Provence
  - Church of St. Trophime and cloister, Arles
  - Tour Fenestrelle, Uzès
  - Abbey of Sénanque, Gordes
  - Le Thoronet Abbey, Brignoles
  - Fréjus Cathedral, Fréjus
  - Silvacane Abbey, La Roque-d'Anthéron
  - Montmajour Abbey, Arles
- Aquitaine
  - Saint-Front, Périgueux
  - Notre-Dame-la-Grande, Poitiers
  - Saint-Pierre, Angoulême
  - Sainte-Croix, Bordeaux
- Auvergne
  - Saint-Foy, Conques
  - Saint-Sernin, Toulouse
  - Notre-Dame-du-Port, Clermont-Ferrand
  - Saint-Austremoine, Issoire
  - Notre-Dame, Orcival
- Normandy
  - Saint-Étienne, Caen,
  - abbey church, Jumièges, Seine-Maritime
  - abbey church of Saint-Georges-de-Boscherville, Seine-Maritime
  - Sainte-Trinité, Caen, Calvados
  - Cerisy-la-Forêt, Manche
  - Lessay, Manche
  - abbey church, Mont Saint-Michel, Avranches
- Saint-Nectaire
- Saint-Saturnin
- Sainte-Madeleine, Vezelay
- Basilica of Paray-le-Monial
- Abbey Church of Saint-Savin-sur-Gartempe
- Chapaize
- Abbatiale de Cruas
- Abbey of Vigeois, Limousin
- Fontevraud Abbey
- Saint-Martin-du-Canigou, Roussillon
- Sainte-Croix de Quimperlé Abbey, Quimperlé

=== Germany ===
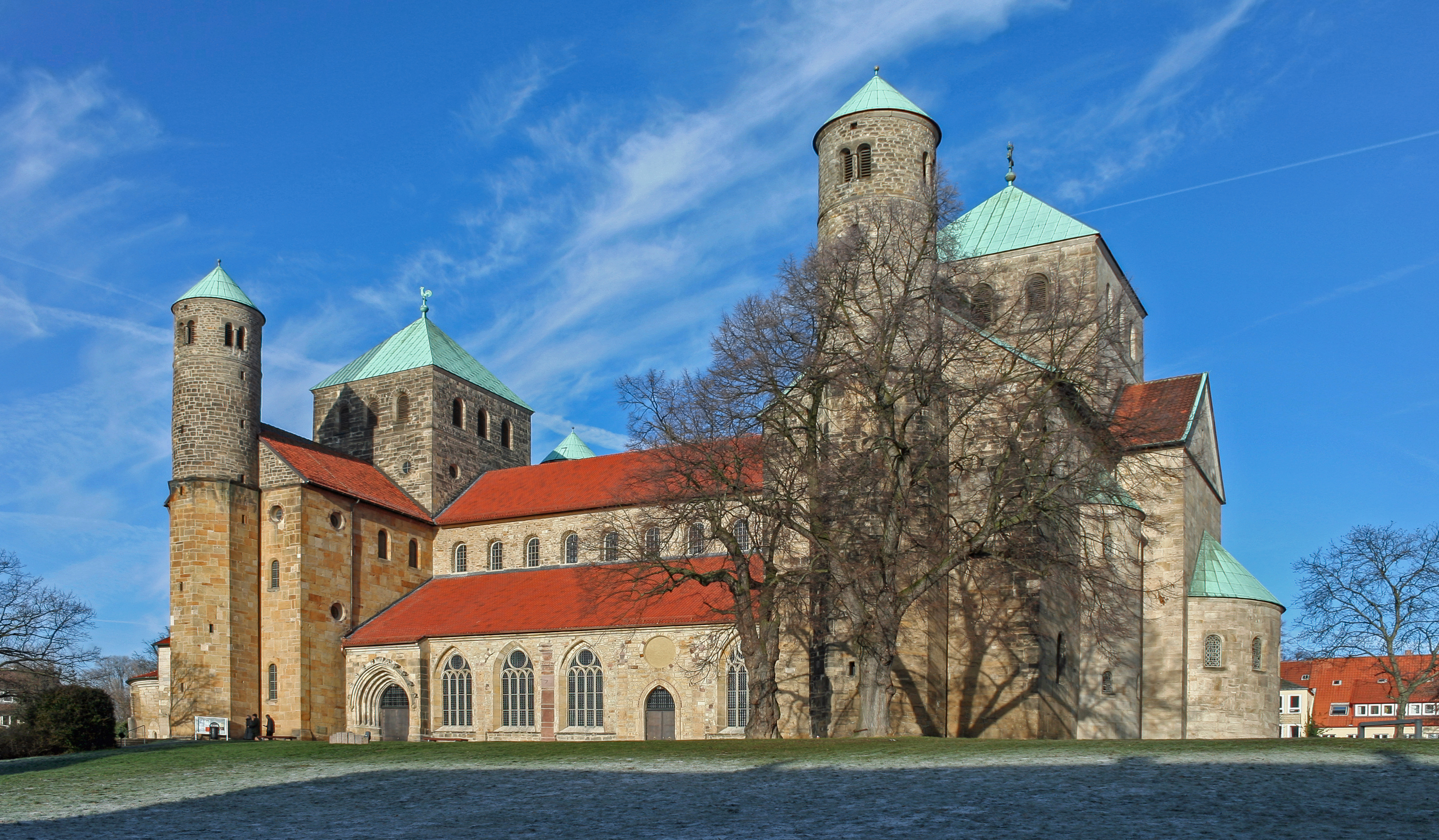
Romanesque St. Michael's Church (1010-33) in Hildesheim – a World Heritage Site

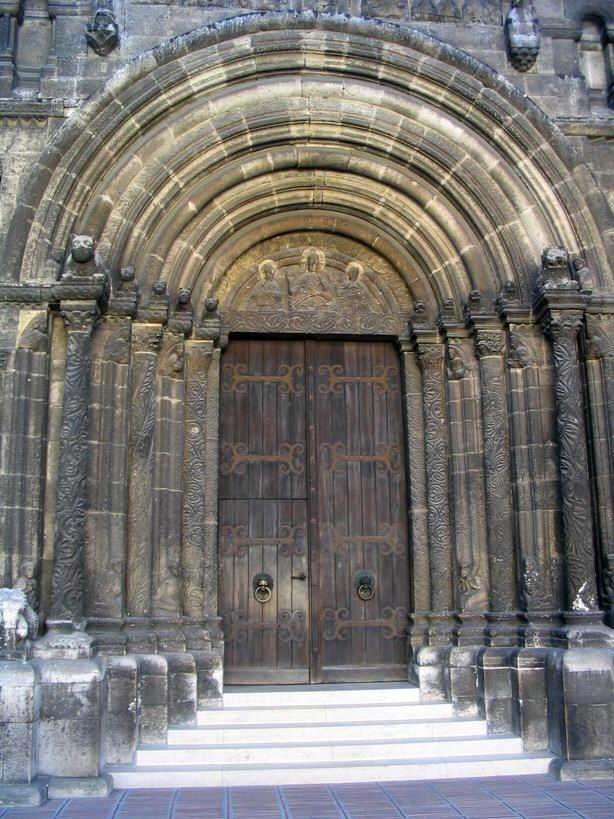
Romanesque portal of Schottenkirche, Regensburg

- Bamberg Cathedral
- Bonn Minster
- Brunswick Cathedral
- Cologne
  - the twelve Romanesque churches of Cologne, include Gross St Martin, St. Maria im Kapitol with fine wooden doors, the central plan St. Gereon, St. Aposteln, St. Pantaleon
- Freising, Cathedral
- Gernrode, St. Cyriakus' Church
- Goslar
  - Goslar Cathedral
  - Imperial Palace
- Hildesheim
  - Hildesheim Cathedral
  - St. Michael's Church
  - St. Godehard's Church
  - Church of the Holy Cross
  - St. Mauritius Church
- Mainz Cathedral
- Maria Laach Abbey
- Naumburg Cathedral
- Regensburg: Schottenkirche St. Jakob
- Trier Cathedral
- Speyer Cathedral
- Straubing: St. Peter's Church
- Worms Cathedral
- Würzburg Cathedral

=== Hungary ===
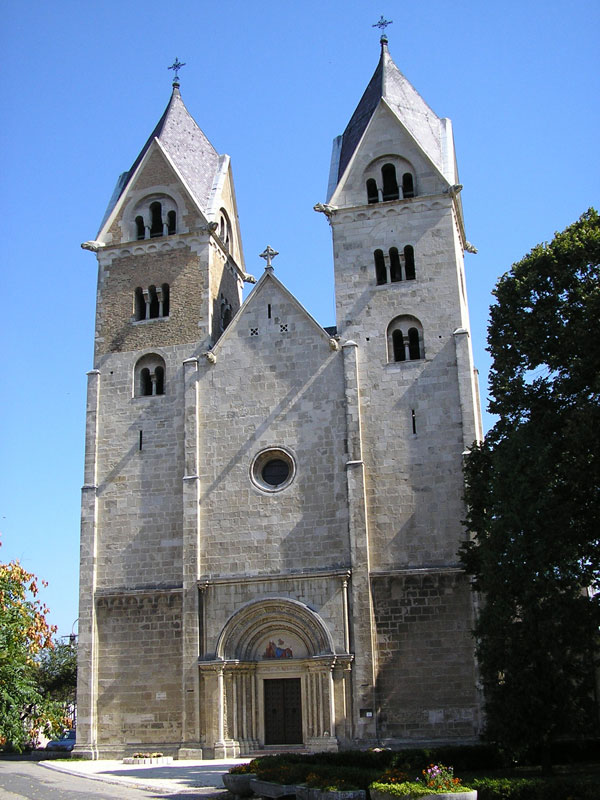
The Romanesque church of Lébény

- Calvinist church, Ócsa (e. 13th century)
- Parish church of the Annunciation of Our Lady, Türje (e. 13th century)
- Parish church of St. James the Apostle, Lébény (c. 1190-1212)
- Premontre monastery church, Zsámbék, (c. 1220–1235)
- Parish church of St. George, Ják (c. 1220-1256)
- Abbey Church of the Assumption of Our Lady, Belapatfalva (1232–1246)
- Cathedral of Pécs Pécs (11th century, 1882–1891)
- Royal palace at Esztergom Esztergom (10th-13th century)
- Pannonhalma Archabbey (certain parts) Pannonhalma (11th-13th century)

=== Ireland ===
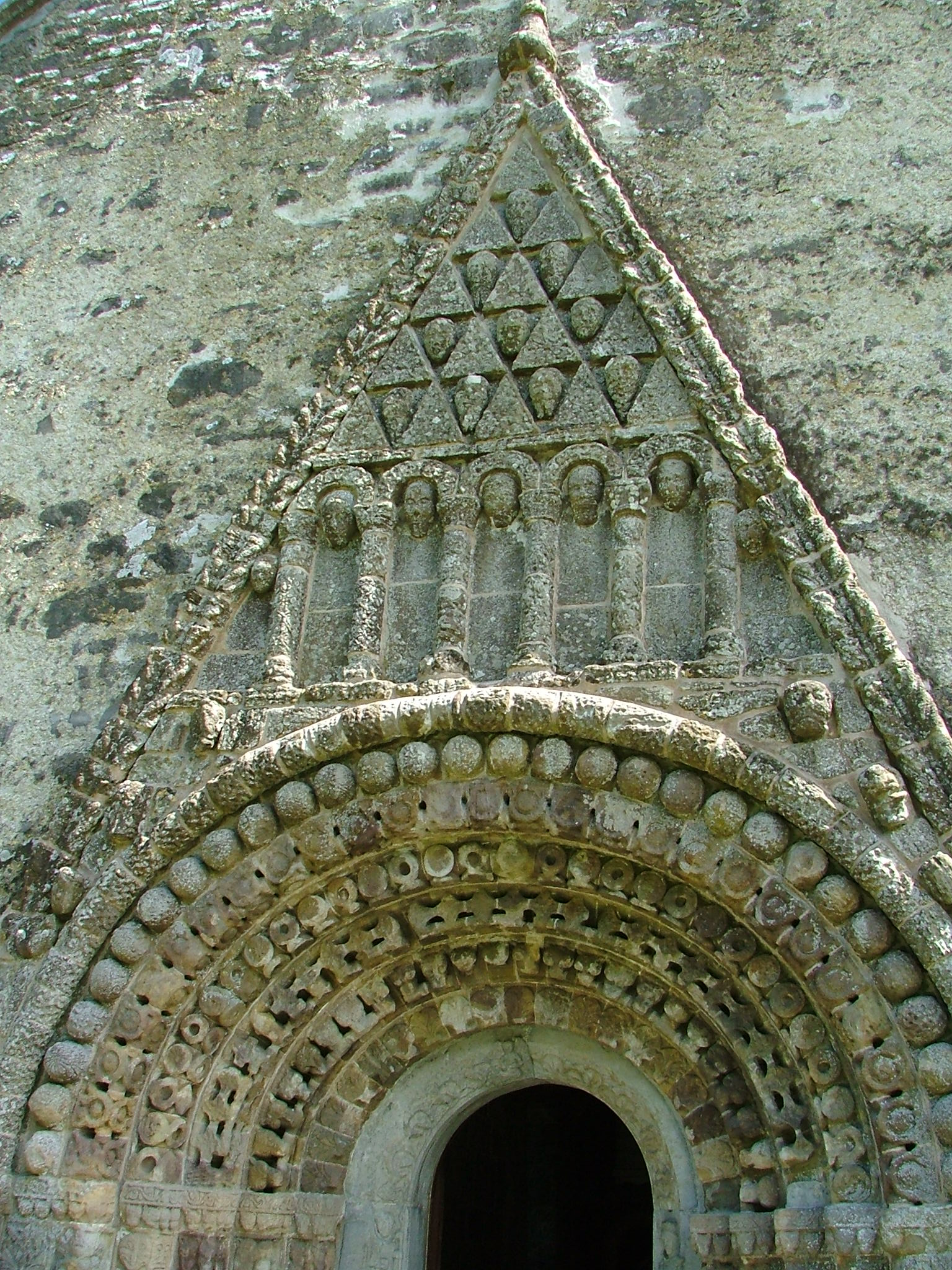
Carving above doorway, Clonfert Cathedral, Co. Galway, Ireland

- Cormac's Chapel, Cashel (1127–1134)
- Aghadoe, County Kerry (1158)
- Nuns' Church, Clonmacnoise (1167)
- Tuam Cathedral and Crosses (c. 1184)
- Ardmore Church and Round Tower, County Waterford
- Baltinglass Cistercian Abbey, County Wicklow
- Boyle Cistercian Abbey, County Roscommon
- Christ Church Cathedral, Dublin
- Clonfert Cathedral, County Galway
- Cong Abbey, County Galway
- Devenish Round Tower and Churches, County Fermanagh
- Dysert O'Dea Church and Round Tower, County Clare
- Freshford, County Kilkenny
- Jerpoint Cistercian Abbey, County Kilkenny
- Killeshin, County Laois
- Maghera, County Londonderry
- Monaincha Abbey and Cross, County Tipperary
- Rahan Church of Ireland Church, County Offaly
- Timahoe Round Tower, County Laois
- St. Saviour's, Glendalough

=== Italy ===
In Italy, the prevalent diffusion is in Lombardy, in Emilia - Romagna, in Tuscany, in the continental part of Veneto and in Apulia; everyone of these "Romanesque styles" has proper characteristics, for constructing methods and for materials. For example, a characteristic of Romanesque is that to change the classic elements with Christian elements, but in Tuscany and Apulia the classic decoratings remain.

Materials depended from the local disponibility, because the importation was too expensive. In fact, in Lombardy the most used material is ceramic, because of the argillous nature of the terrain; but that is not true for Como, where there were large diponibility of stone; in Tuscany buildings in white marble (from Carrara) are frequent, with inserts of green serpentin marble.

In Lombardy and Emilia, in that age united, in Romanesque epoque there was a great artistic flowering. The most monumental churches and cathedrals are often built with the campata system, with varying columns which weigh a tutto sesto arcos. In plain the material of construction is prevalently the mattone, but buildings in stone do not lack. The greater part of the Roman cities along the via Emilia is equipped in this age of monumental cathedral, between which they already maintain to the medieval system.

==== Apulia ====
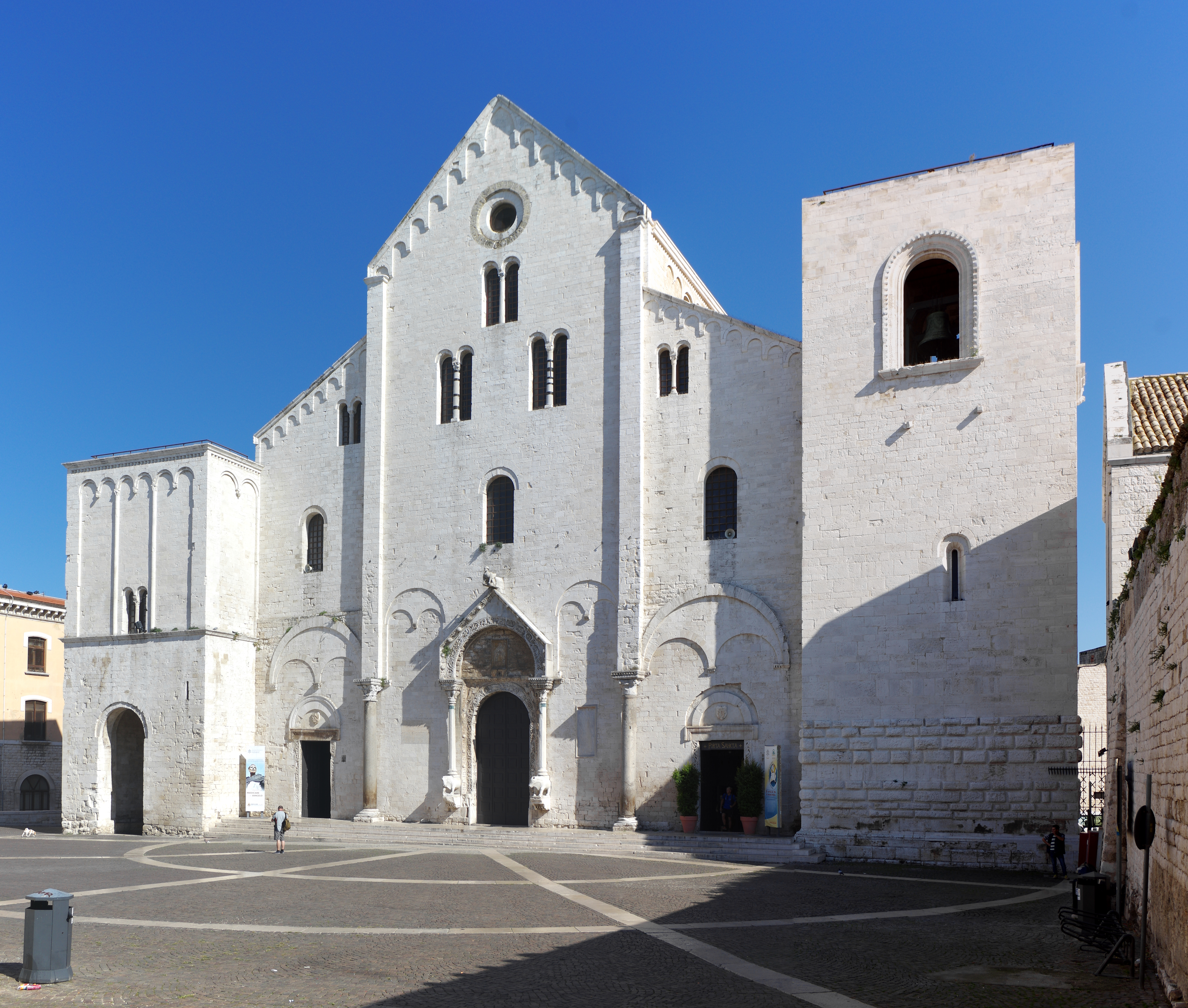
Basilica of St. Nicholas

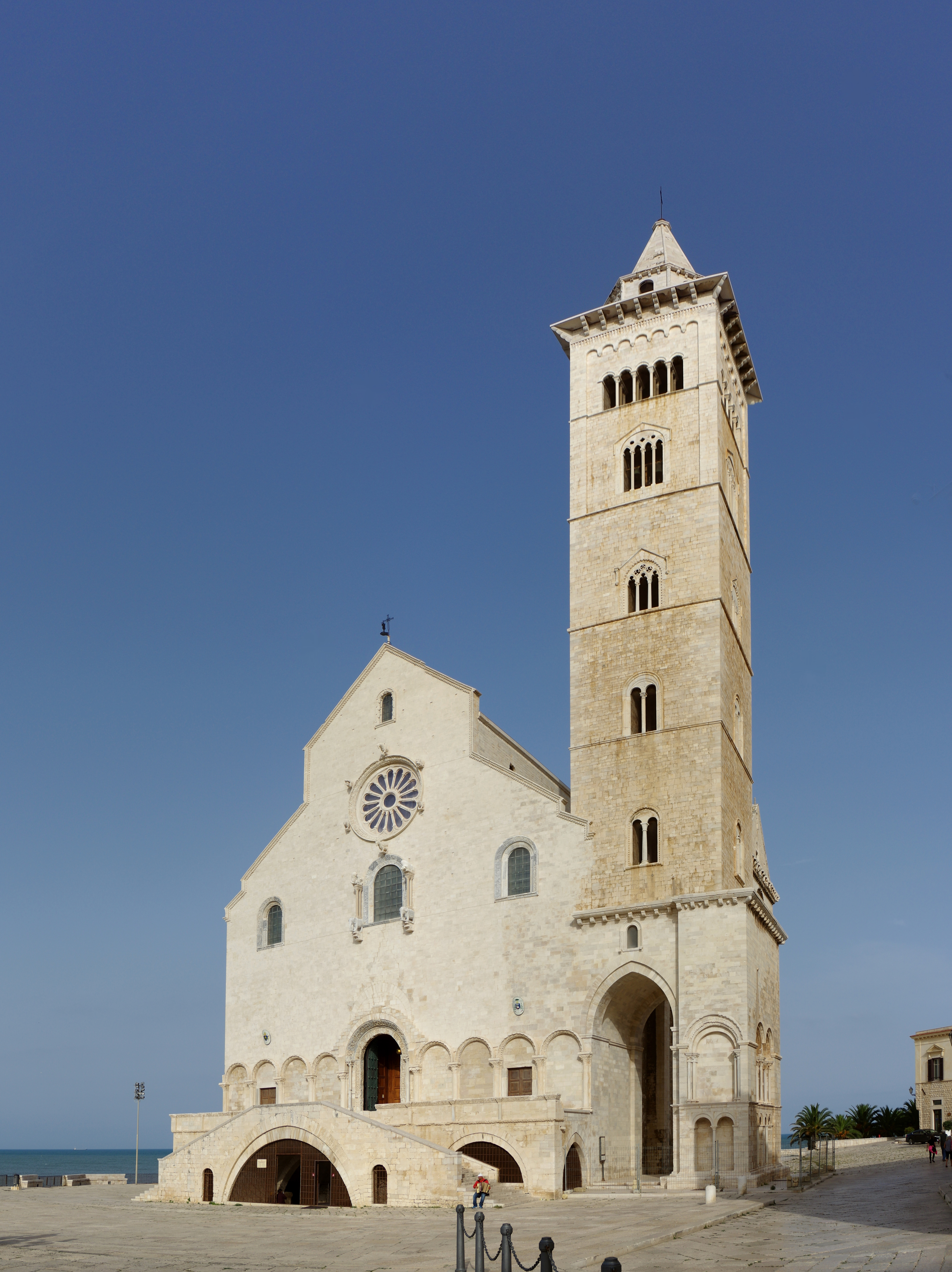
Trani Cathedral

- Basilica of San Nicola, Bari
- Bari Cathedral
- Ruvo Cathedral
- Otranto Cathedral
- Barletta Cathedral
- Andria Cathedral
- Church of Saint Conrad, Molfetta
- Altamura Cathedral
- Basilica of Santa Maria Maggiore di Siponto
- Conversano cathedral
- Basilica del Santo Sepolcro, Barletta
- Cathedral of Bitonto
- Trani Cathedral

==== Abruzzo ====
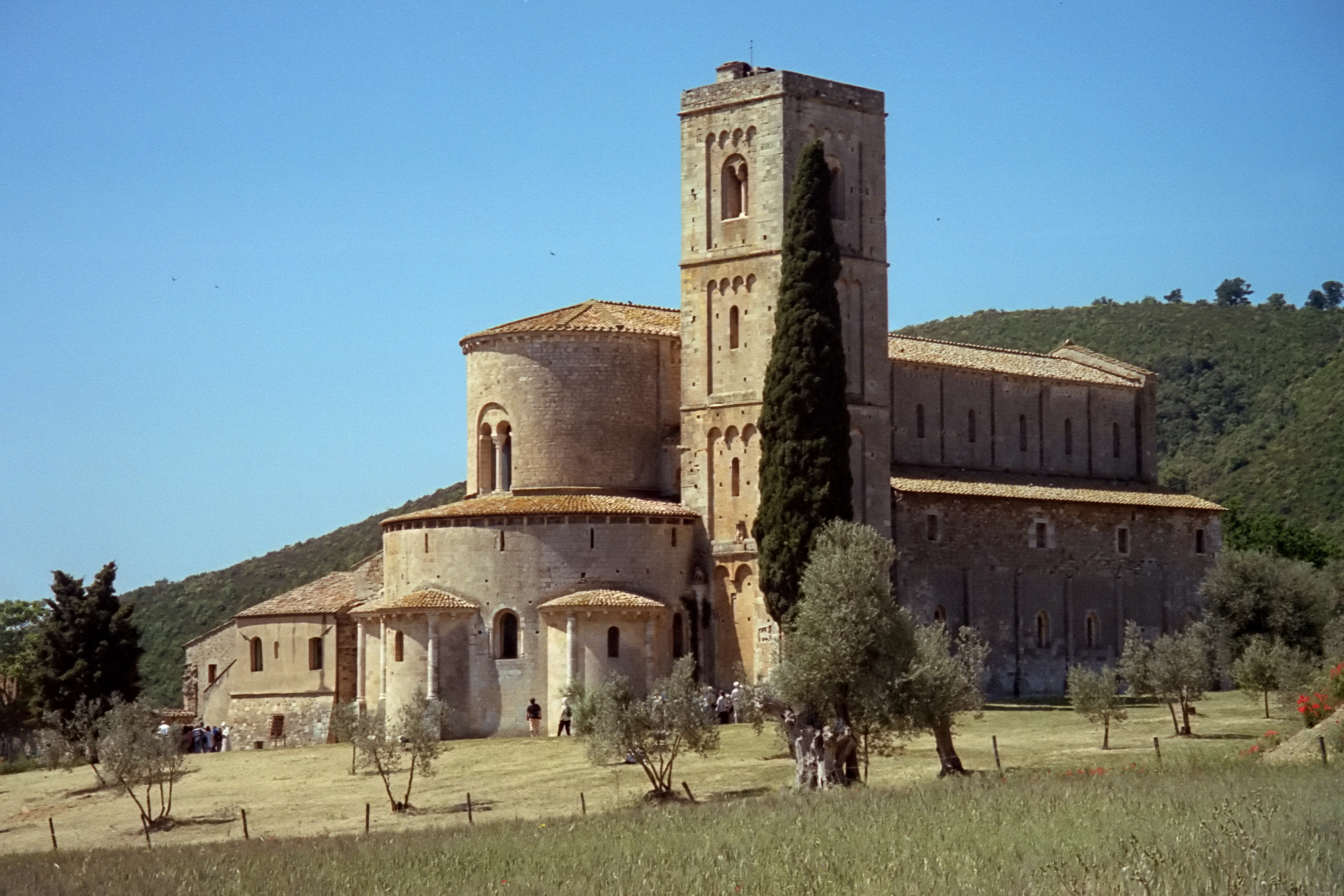
Abbey of Sant'Antimo

- San Clemente a Casauria
- San Liberatore a Maiella
- Santa Maria Arabona
- Sant'Antimo Abbey

==== Aosta Valley ====
- Aosta Cathedral
- Collegiate church of Saint Ursus

==== Emilia-Romagna ====
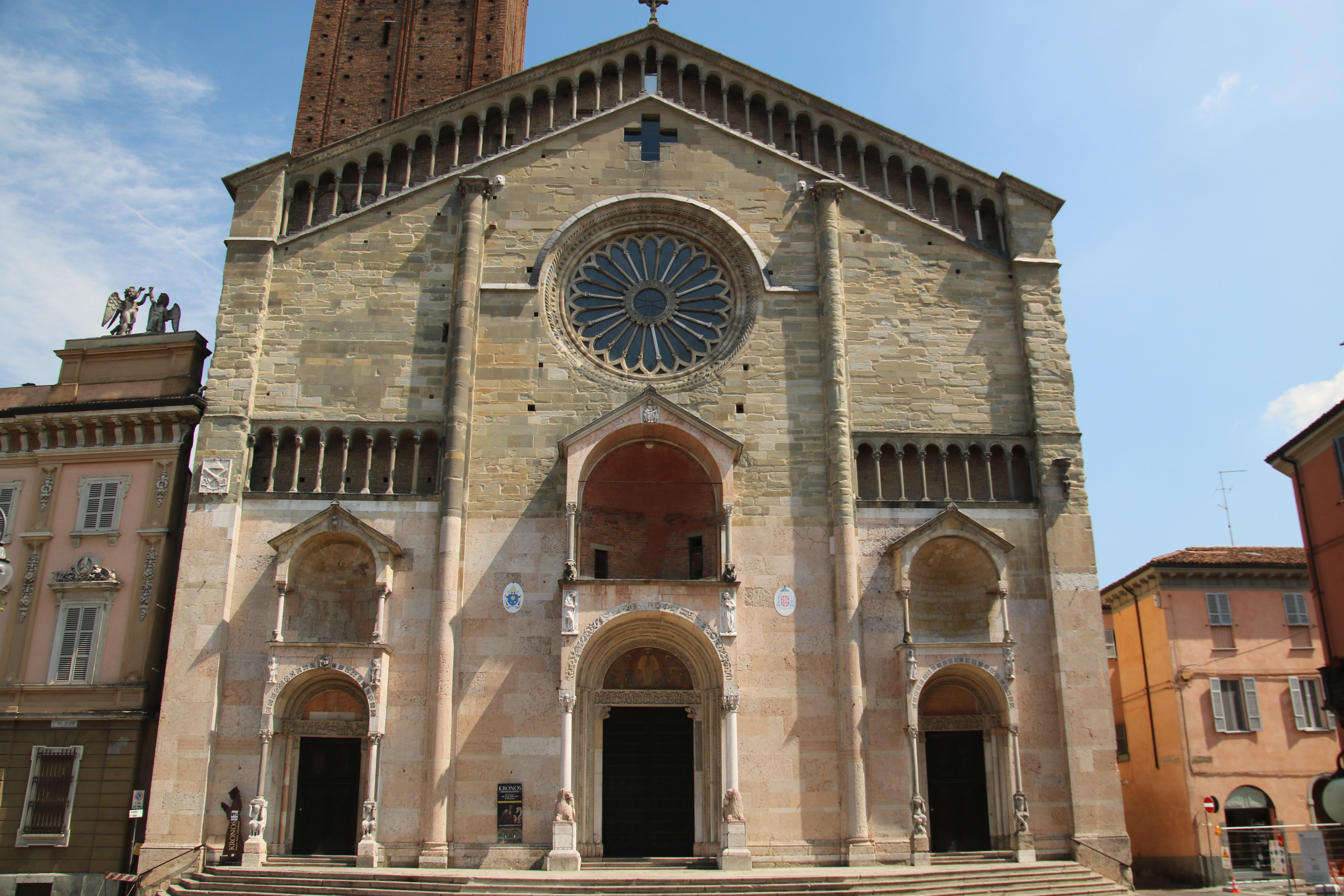
Piacenza Cathedral

- Modena Cathedral - Media related to the Modena Cathedral at Wikimedia Commons
- Abbey of San Mercuriale, Forlì and campanile - Media related to San Mercuriale at Wikimedia Commons
- Chiesa di S. Maria Oliveto (Albinea - province of Reggio Emilia)
- Parma Baptistery - Media related to Parma Baptistery at Wikimedia Commons
- Parma Cathedral - Media related to the Parma Cathedral at Wikimedia Commons
- Piacenza Cathedral - Media related to the Piacenza Cathedral at Wikimedia Commons

==== Friuli-Venezia Giulia ====
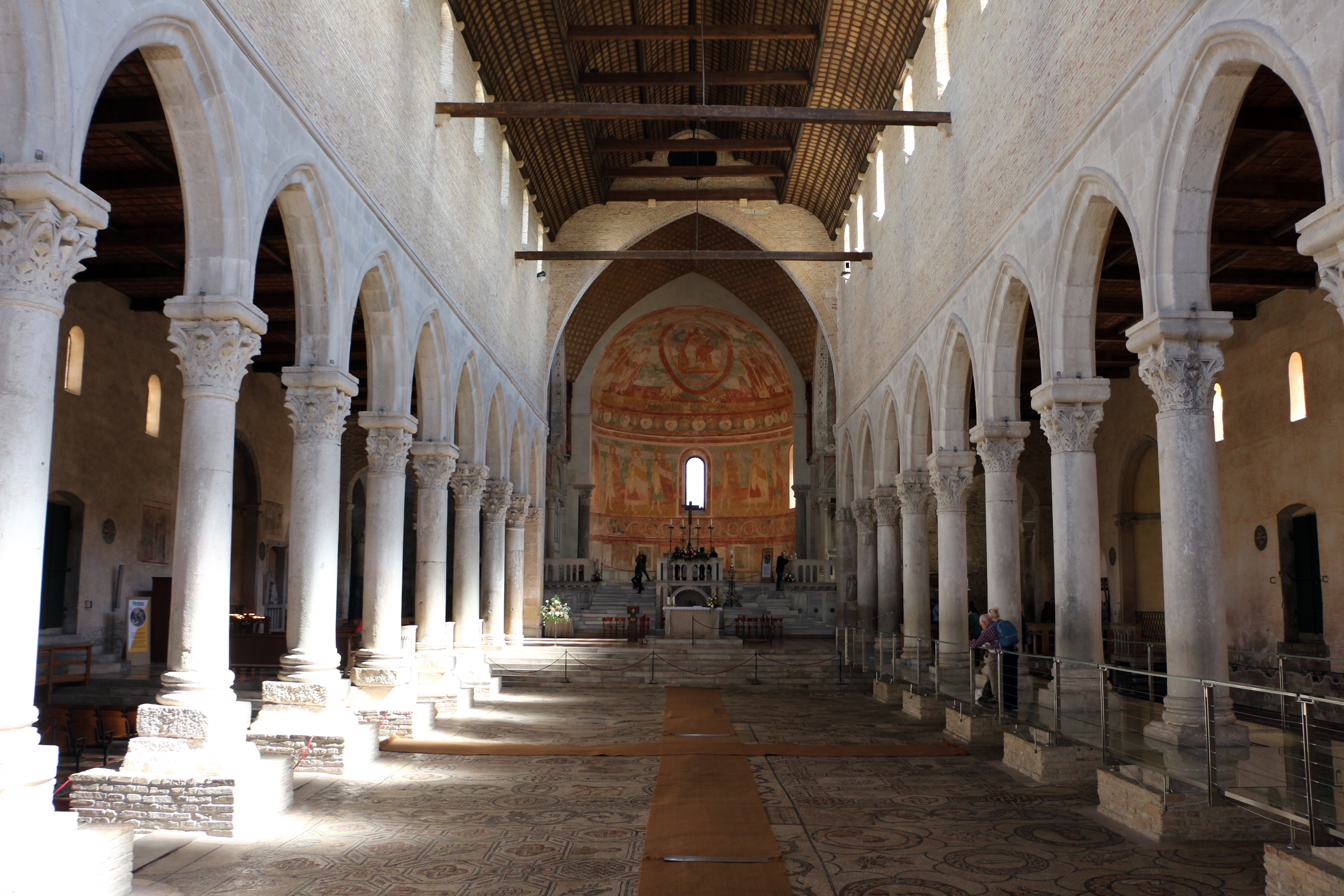
Basilica di Santa Maria Assunta, Aquileia

- Basilica di Poppo, Aquileia, province of Udine
- Basilica patriarcale, Aquileia - province of Udine

==== Latium ====
- Cathedral of Acquapendente (province of Viterbo)
- Church of S. Maria della Libera (Aquino - province of Frosinone)

==== Lombardy ====
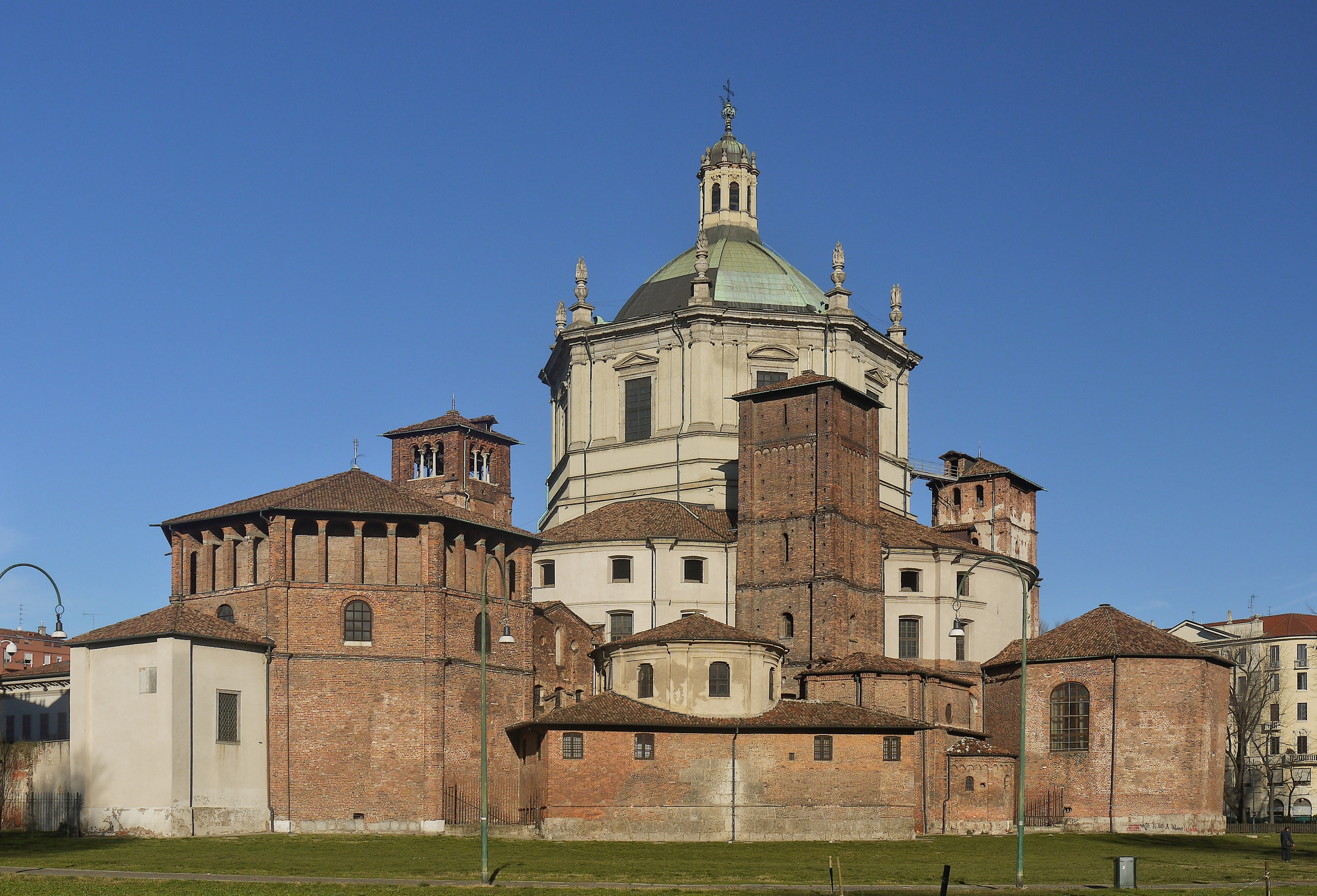
Basilica of San Lorenzo, Milan

- Sant'Ambrogio, Milan
- San Lorenzo, Milan
- Duomo vecchio, Brescia
- San Michele Maggiore, Pavia
- Cathedral of Monza
- S. Cosma e Damiano (Rezzago - province of Como)
- Madonna del Ghisallo (Magreglio - province of Como)
- S. Alessandro (Lasnigo - province of Como)
- S. Pietro (Albese - province of Como)
- Chiesa di S. Tommaso (Acquanegra sul Chiese - province of Mantova)
- Sant'Abbondio (Como)
- San Tomè (Almenno San Bartolomeo - province of Bergamo)

==== Marche ====
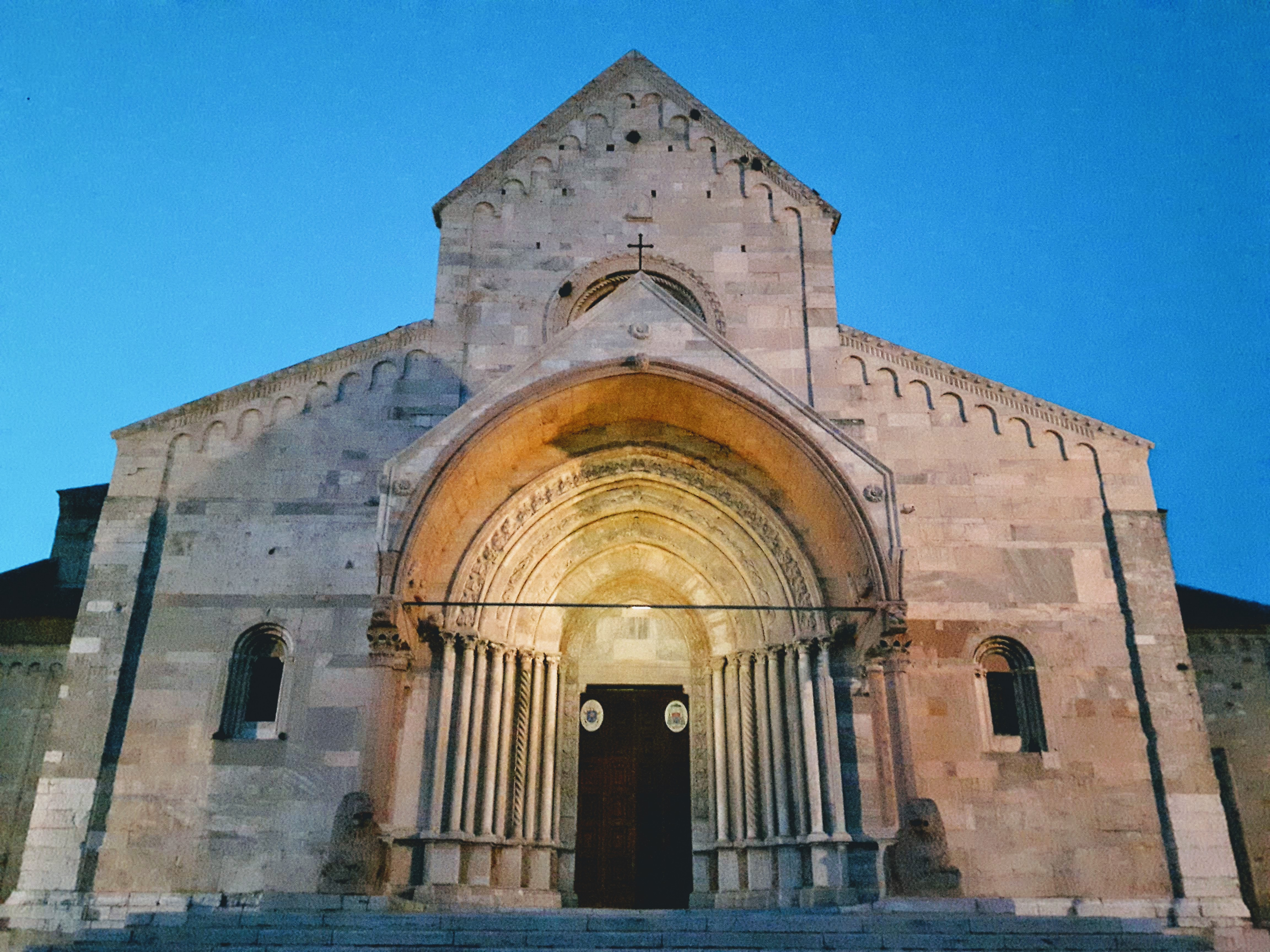
Ancona Cathedral

- Ancona Cathedral (Ancona)
- Santa Maria della Piazza, Ancona (Ancona)
- Pieve of Sant'Urbano (Apiro - province of Macerata)
- San Vittore alle Chiuse

==== Marche ====
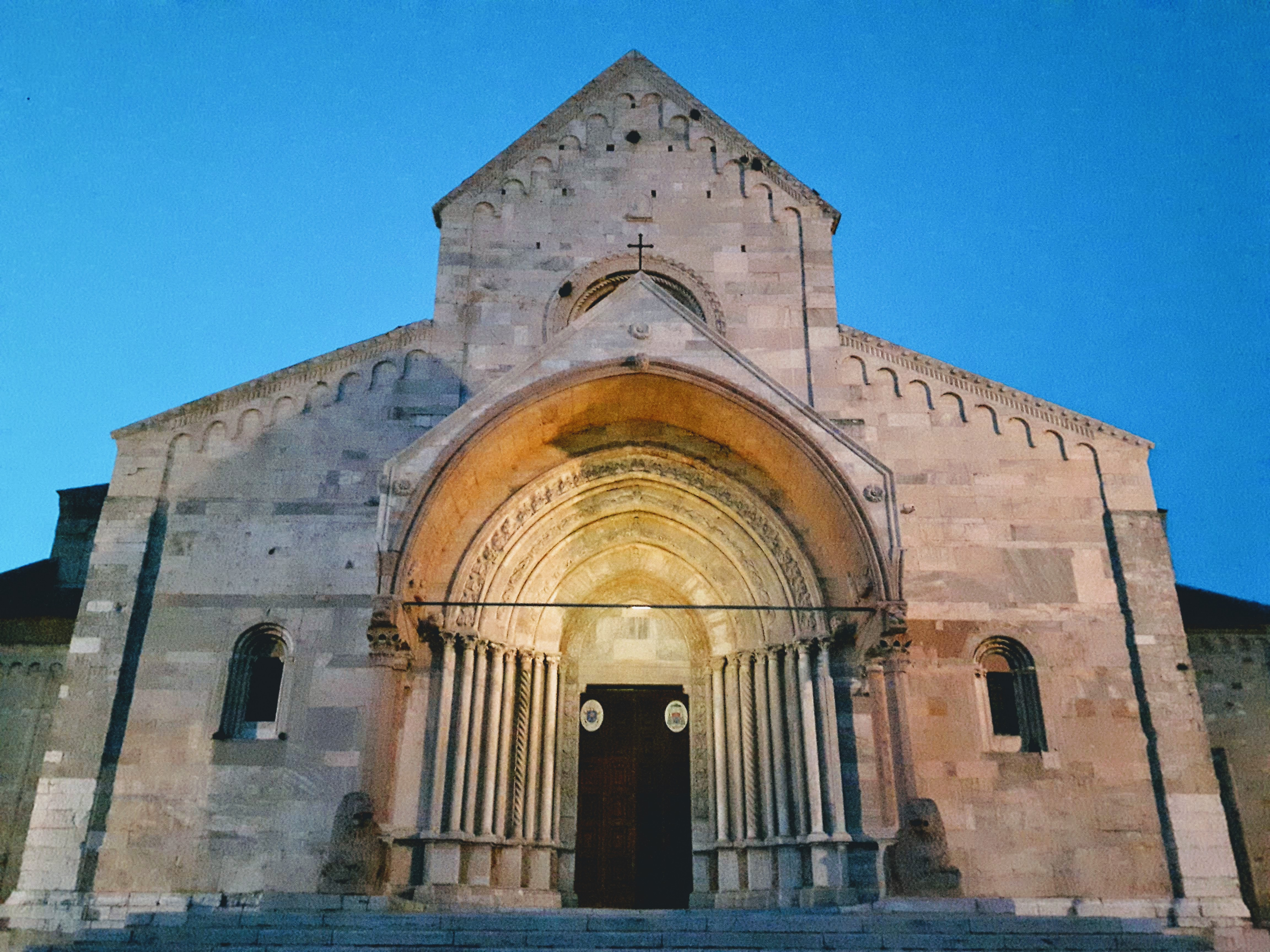
Ancona Cathedral

- Ancona Cathedral (Ancona)
- Santa Maria della Piazza, Ancona (Ancona)
- Pieve of Sant'Urbano (Apiro - province of Macerata)
- San Vittore alle Chiuse

==== Piedmont ====
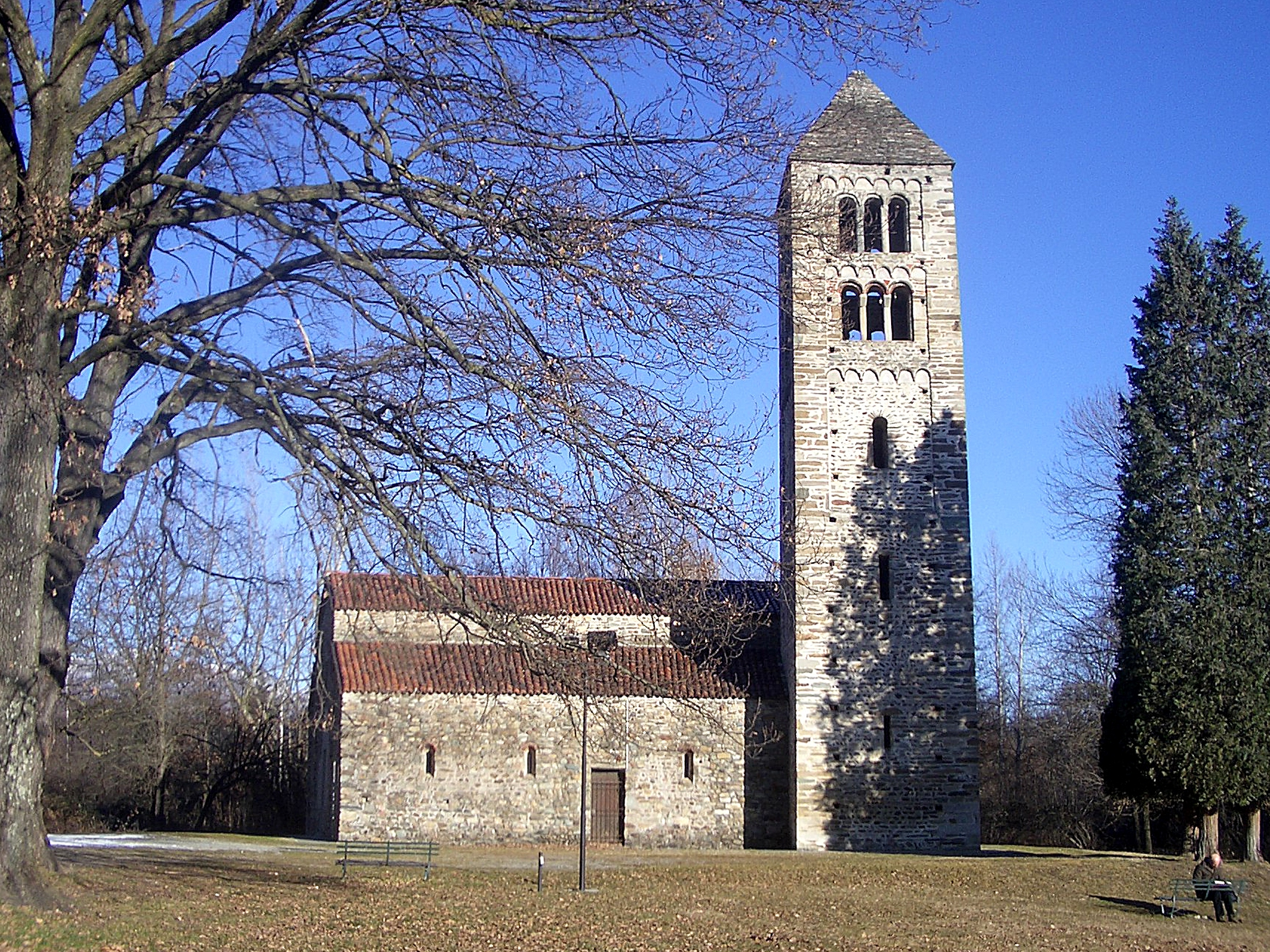
San Secondo (Magnano)

- Vezzolano Abbey (Albugnano - province of Asti)
- Crypt of Sant'Anastasio (Asti)
- Pieve of San Secondo (Cortazzone - province of Asti)
- San Secondo (Magnano)
- Church of Saints Nazarius and Celsus (Montechiaro - province of Asti)
- Pieve of San Lorenzo (Montiglio - province of Asti)
- San Michele, Oleggio
- Abbey of Santi Nazario e Celso (San Nazzaro Sesia - province of Novara)
- Abbey of Santa Fede (Cavagnolo - province of Tourin)
- Cattedrale dell'Addolorata (Acqui Terme - province of Alessandria)
- Church of S. Pietro (Albugnano - province of Asti)
- Baptistery of Agrate (Agrate Conturbia - province of Novara)
- Romanesque architecture in Canavese area Ivrea - Media related to Romanesque architecture in Canavese at Wikimedia Commons

==== Sardinia ====
- S. Giusta (S. Giusta)
- S. Maria (Bonarcado)
- S. Paolo (Milis)
- S. Palmerio (Ghilarza)
- Il Carmine (Mogoro)
- S. Gregorio (Sardara)
- S. Leonardo (Masullas)
- S. Lussorio (Fordongianus)
- S. Gregorio (Solarussa)
- S. Nicola di Trullas (Semestene)
- San Nicola di Silanis (Sedini)
- S. Pietro (Zuri - Sardinia
- S. Maria Maddalena (Silì)
- S. Maria della Mercede (Norbello)
- S. Pietro di Sorres (Borutta)
- Santissima Trinità di Saccargia
- Sant'Antioco di Bisarcio (Ozieri)
- Santa Maria del Regno (Ardara)
- San Simplicio, Olbia
- Nostra Signora di Tergu
- S. Pantaleo (Dolianova)
- S. Alenixedda (Cagliari)
- S. Lorenzo (Silanus)
- S. Leonardo (Siete Fuentes)
- S. Maria (Uta)
- S. Maria (Tratalias)
- S. Pietro Extramuros (Bosa)
- S. Gavino (Porto Torres)

Sicily

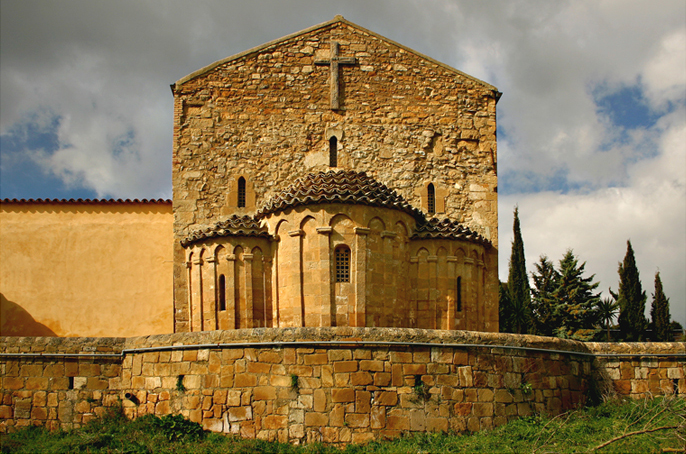
Abbey of the Santo Spirito, Caltanissetta

- Cathedral, Cefalù
- Cathedral, Monreale
- Cathedral, Palermo
- Palatine Chapel in Norman Palace, Palermo
- Church of the Holy Spirit, Palermo
- Church of the Holy Spirit (Sicily), Palermo
- Church of San Cataldo, Palermo
- Church of Santi Pietro e Paolo d'Agrò Casalvecchio Siculo
- Church of Saints Peter and Paul, Itala
- Church of San Nicolò la Latina, Sciacca
- Church of Santa Maria della Raccomandata, Sciacca
- Church of Madonna delle Giummare, Mazara del Vallo
- Church of San Nicolò Regale, Mazara del Vallo
- Church of the Santissima Annunziata dei Catalani, Messina
- Abbey of the Santo Spirito, Caltanissetta
- Church of San Nicolò ai Cordari, Syracuse

Tuscany

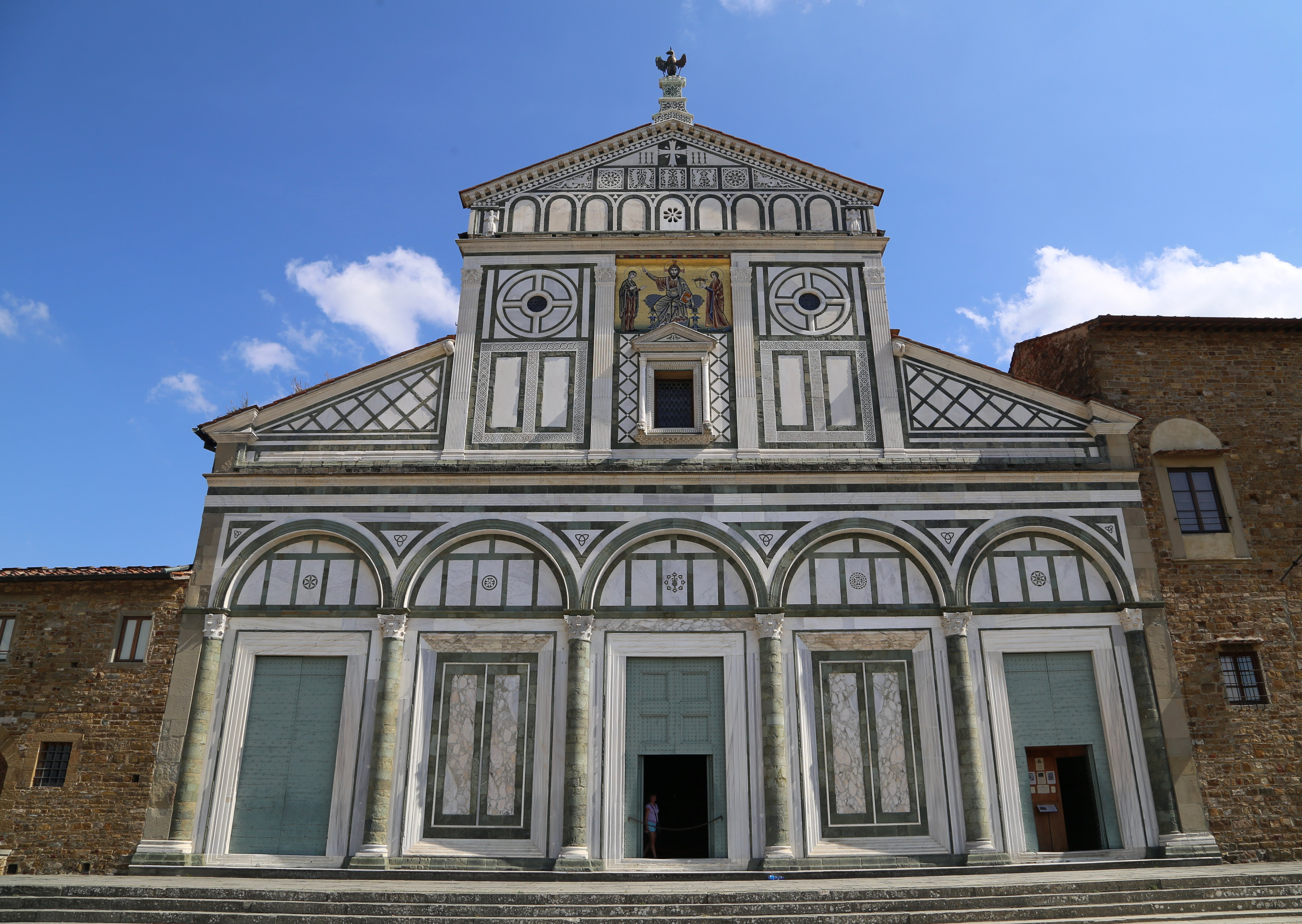
San Miniato al Monte

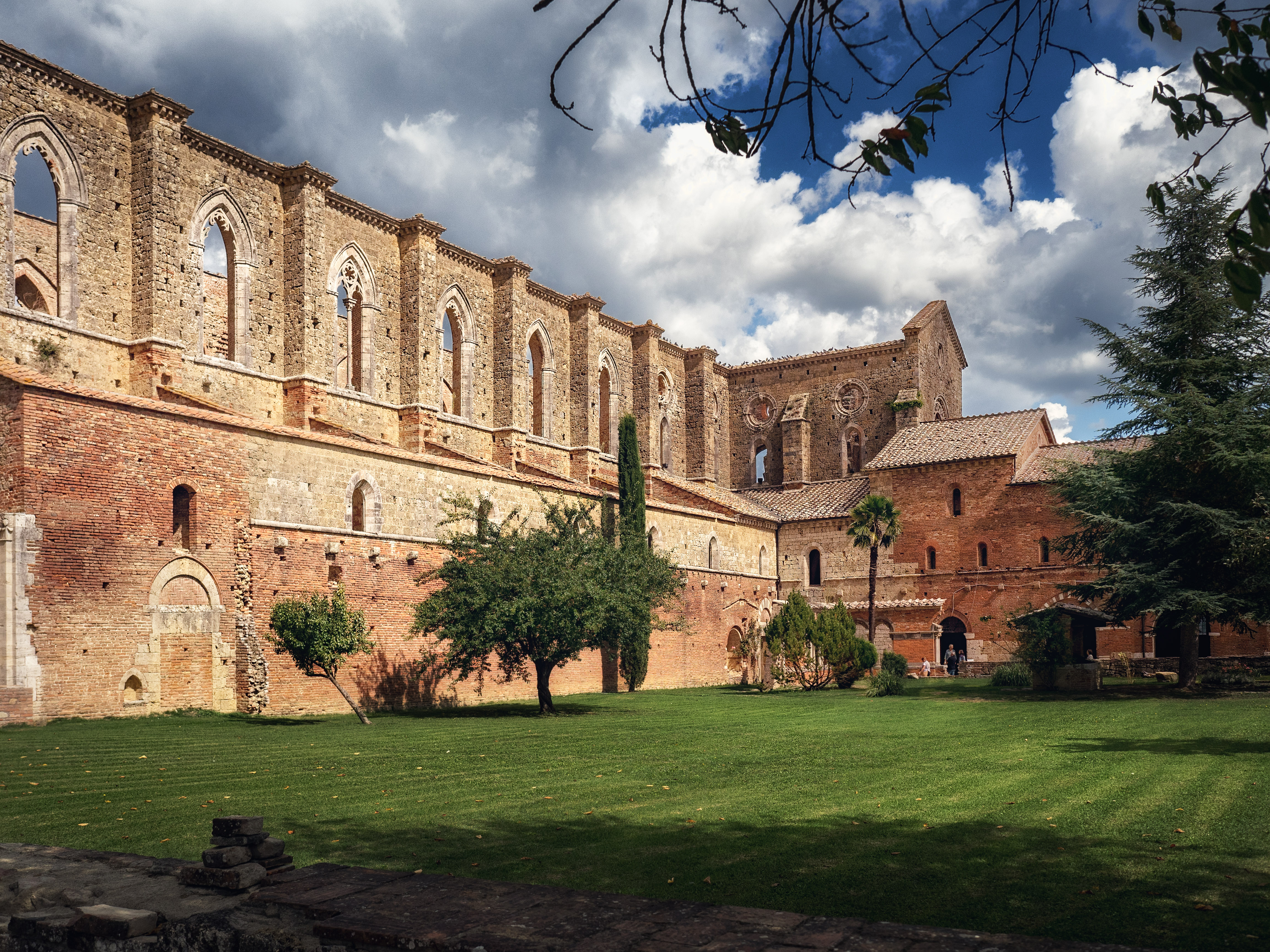
Abbey of San Galgano

- San Miniato al Monte, Florence
- Pisa Cathedral
- San Paolo a Ripa d'Arno, Pisa
- Santa Maria della Pieve, Arezzo
- Sant'Ambrogio, Florence
- Pieve of Romena, Pratovecchio, Arezzo
- Pieve of Làmulas (Arcidosso - province of Grosseto)
- Chiesa abbaziale (Abbadia Isola - province of Siena)
- Chiesa abbaziale (Abbadia San Salvatore - province of Siena)
- Abbey of San Galgano (province of Siena)
- Oratorio of Alpe di Poti, province of Arezzo
- Chiesa di S. Jacopo Maggiore (Altopascio - province of Lucca)
- Chiesa di S. Stefano (Anghiari - province of Arezzo)
- Parish church of Saints Ippolito and Cassiano

Umbria

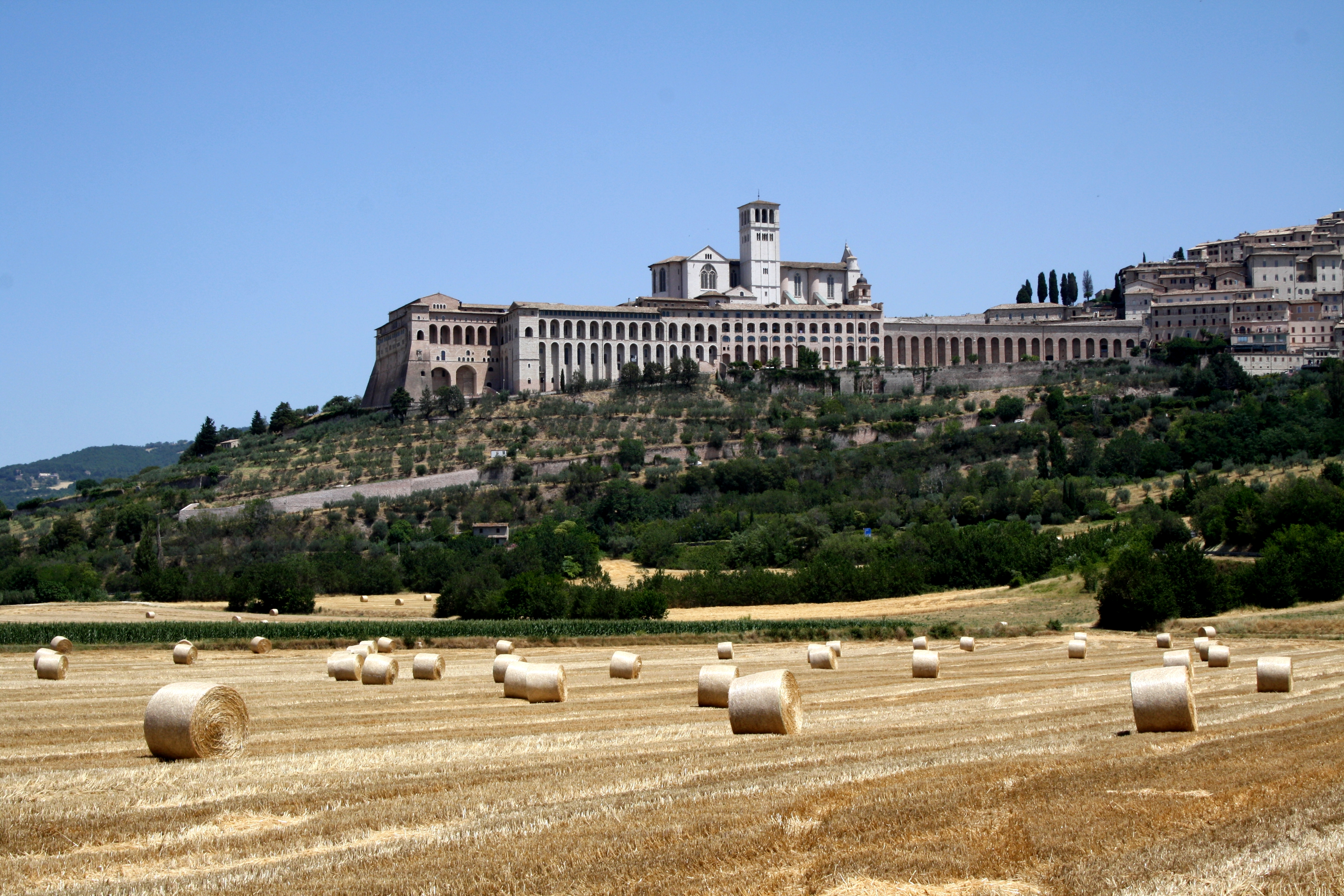
Basilica of Saint Francis of Assisi

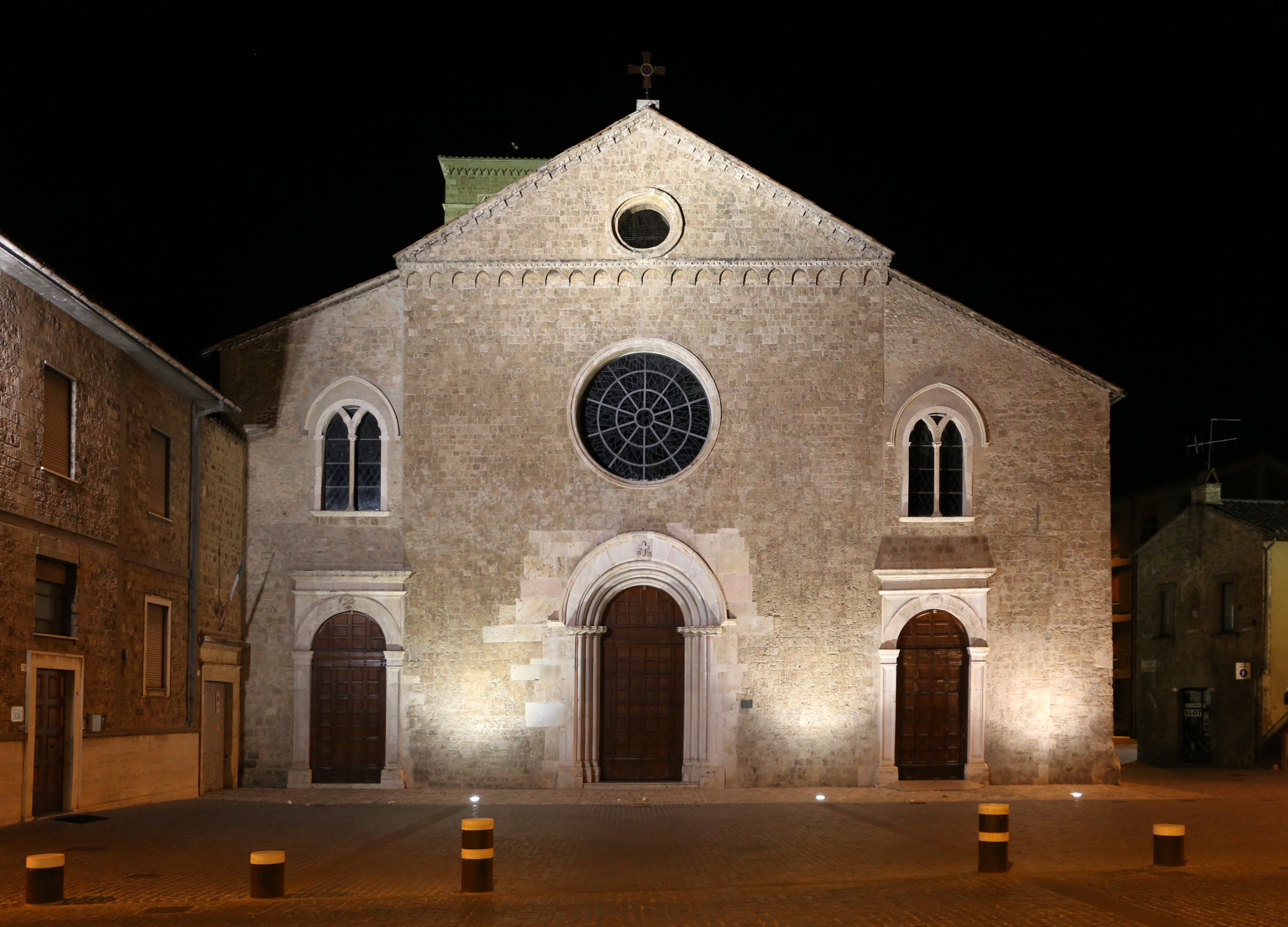
San Francesco, Terni

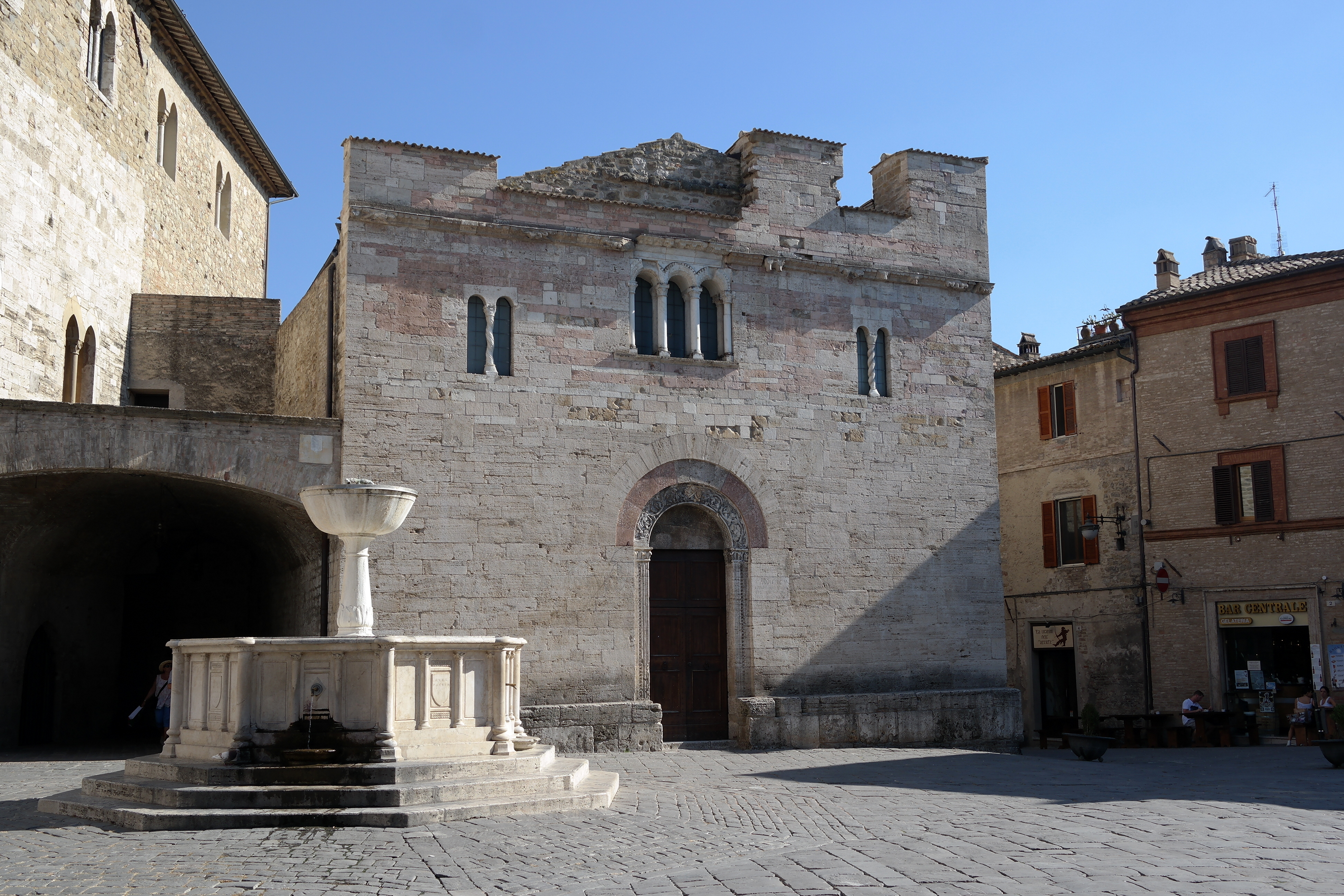
Church of San Silvestro (Bevagna)

- Basilica of Saint Francis of Assisi
- Cathedral of Spoleto
- San Francesco, Terni
- Chiesa di San Bernardino da Siena (La Pigge - Trevi - province of Perugia)
- Chiesa di Sant'Arcangelo (La Pigge - Trevi - province of Perugia)
- Eremo di San Marco e la grotta del Beato Ventura (La Pigge - Trevi - province of Perugia)
- Chiesa Tonda (La Pigge - Trevi - province of Perugia)
- S. Maria di Pietrarossa (Trevi - province of Perugia)
- S. Stefano di Piaggia (Trevi - province of Perugia)
- S. Nicolò (Trevi - province of Perugia)
- S. Fabiano (Trevi - province of Perugia)
- S. Tommaso (Trevi - province of Perugia)
- S. Sabino (Trevi - province of Perugia)
- S. Pietro a Pettine (Trevi - province of Perugia)
- S. Costanzo (Trevi - province of Perugia)
- S. Andrea (Trevi - province of Perugia)
- S. Egidio di Borgo (Trevi - province of Perugia)
- S. Donato (Trevi - province of Perugia)
- S. Leonardo del Colle (Trevi - province of Perugia)
- S. Martino in Manciano (Trevi - province of Perugia)
- S. Apollinare (Trevi - province of Perugia)
- S. Stefano in Manciano (Trevi - province of Perugia)
- S. Pietro in Bovara (Trevi - province of Perugia)
- S. Maria di Pelan (Trevi - province of Perugia)
- S. Paolo di Coste (Trevi - province of Perugia)
- S. Croce in Val dell'Aquila (Trevi - province of Perugia)
- S. Emiliano (Trevi - province of Perugia)

Veneto

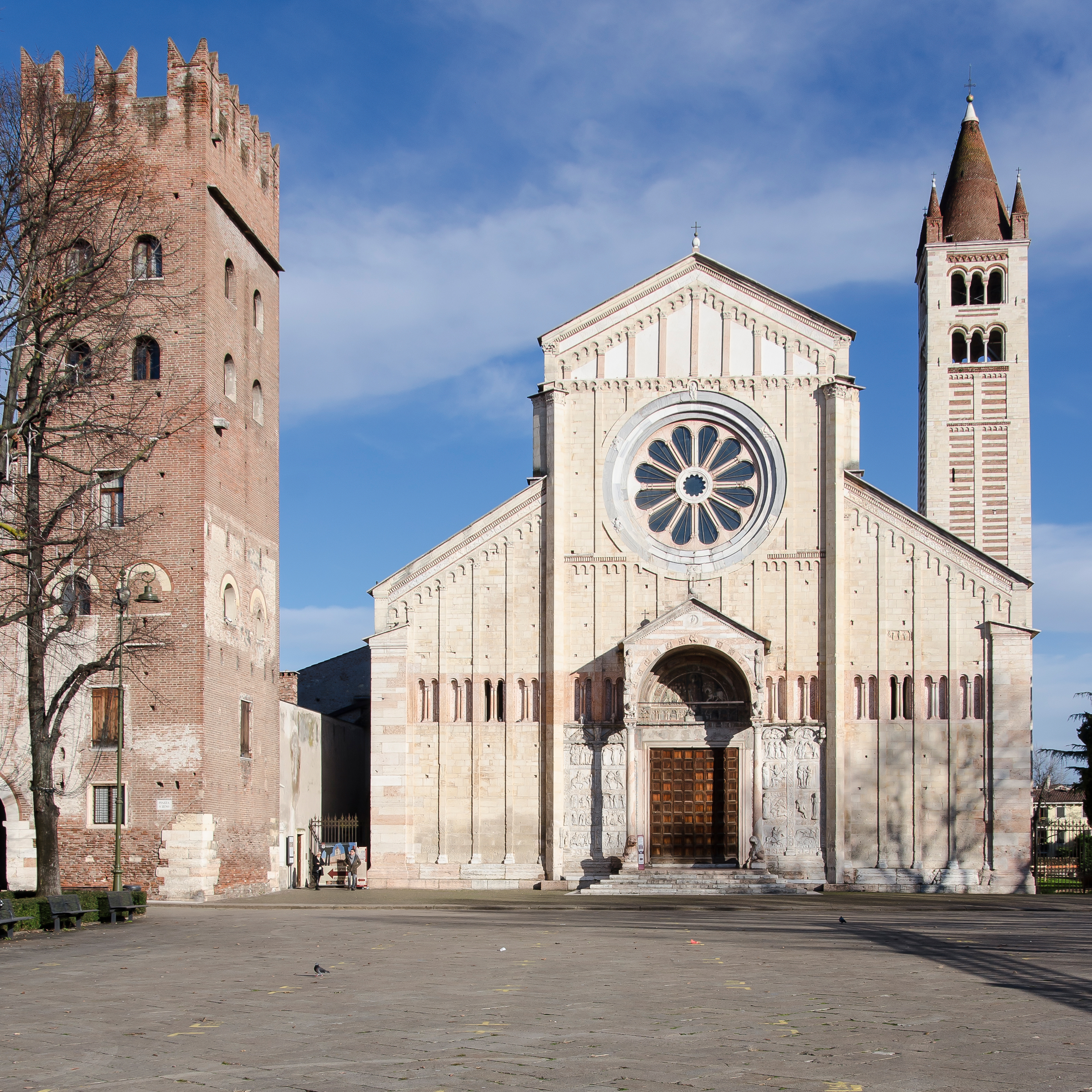
Basilica di San Zeno, (Verona)

- Basilica di San Zeno, Verona
- Santa Sofia Church (Padua)
- San Giacomo dell'Orio (Venice)
- San Lorenzo, Verona
- Santa Toscana, Verona
- Santa Maria Maggiore (Gazzo, province of Verona)
- S. Pietro (Villanova - province of Verona)
- S. Maria (Bonavigo - province of Verona)
- S. Michele (Belfiore - province of Verona)
- S. Andrea (Sommacampagna - province of Verona)

=== Netherlands ===
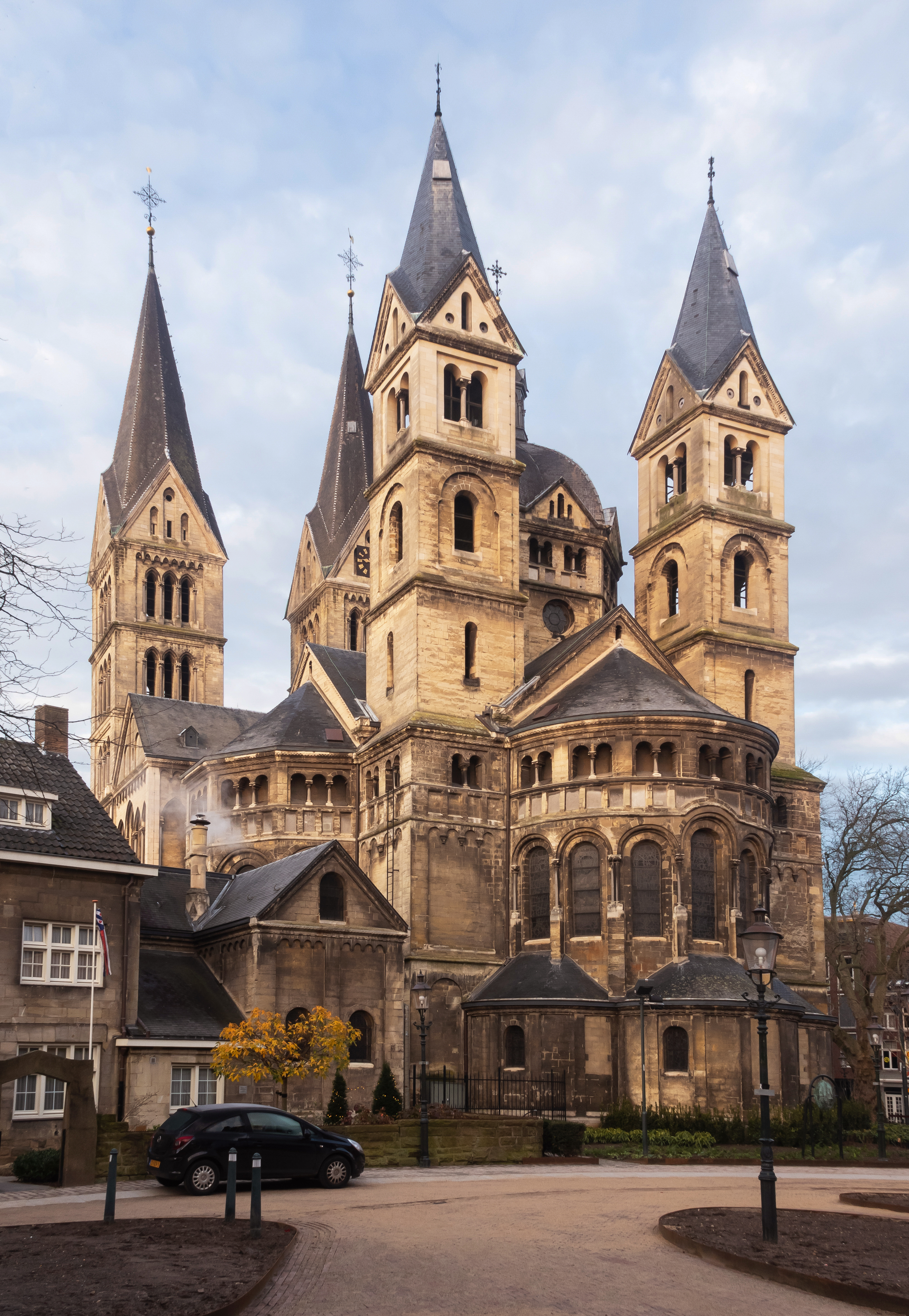
Munsterkerk in Roermond, The Netherlands

- Basilica of Saint Servatius, Maastricht (English:Saint Servaes)
- Onze-Lieve-Vrouwe, Maastricht (Church of Our Lady)
- Munsterkerk, Roermond
- Janskerk, Utrecht (Saint John's Church)
- Pieterskerk, Utrecht (Saint Peters Church)
- St. Plechelmus, Oldenzaal (Saint Plecholmus Church)
- Chapel, Lemiers (Chapel)
- Reformed church, Oirschot
- Abbey church Rolduc, Kerkrade
- Susteren Abbey, Susteren
- St. Wiro, Plechelmus and Otgerus, Sint Odiliënberg
- St. Remigius, Klimmen

=== Poland ===
- Greater Poland
  - St. Trinity-Church in Strzelno
  - St. Prokop-Rotunda in Strzelno
  - St. Nicolaus-Church in Giecz
  - Romanesque doors in Gniezno Cathedral
  - Church of St. John from Jerusalem Outside the Walls in Poznań
  - Born of Blessed Virgin Mary Church in Kotłów
  - Benedictine Abbey in Mogilno

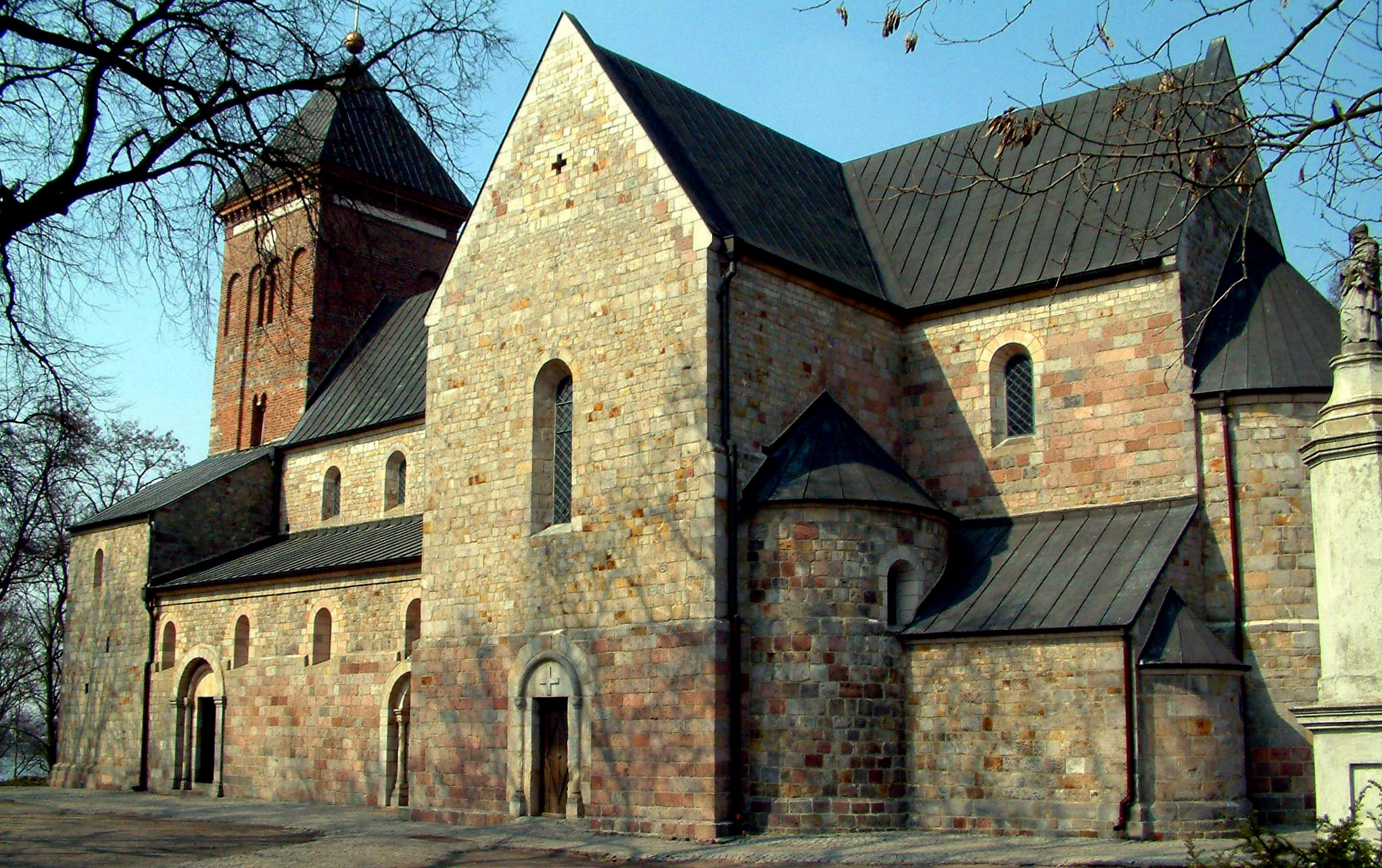
St Peter and Paul-Collegiate, Kruszwica

- Kuyavia
  - St. Peter and Paul-Collegiate in Kruszwica
  - St. Mary-Church in Inowrocław
  - St. Margaret Church in Kościelec Kujawski

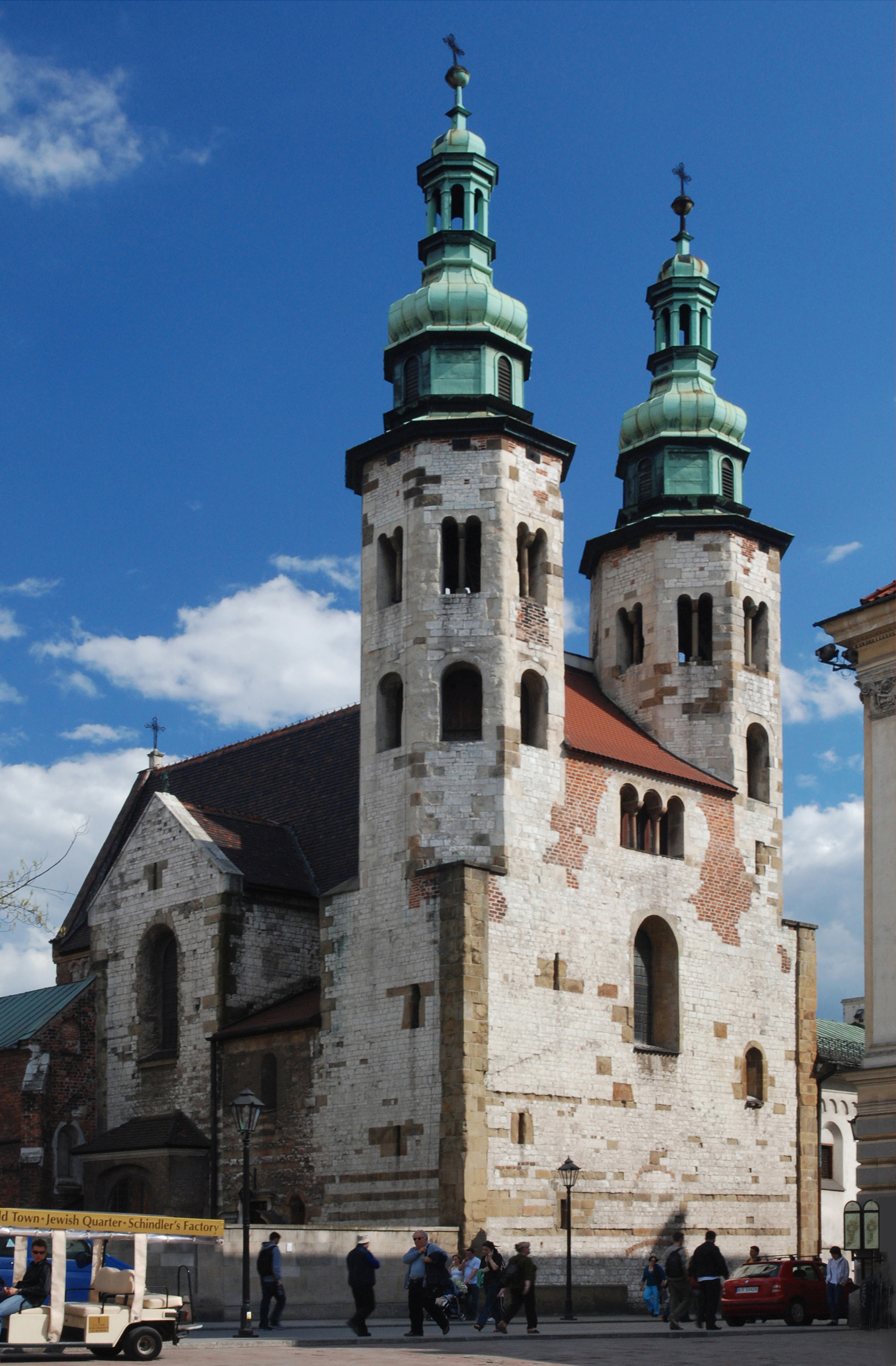
St. Andrew's Church, Kraków

- Lesser Poland
  - St. Andrew's Church in Kraków
  - St. Adalbert Church in Kraków
  - St. Leonard Crypt in Wawel, Kraków
  - St. Nicholas Church in Wysocice
  - St. John the Baptist church in Prandocin
- Lublin Voivodeship
  - Dungeon in Lublin Castle

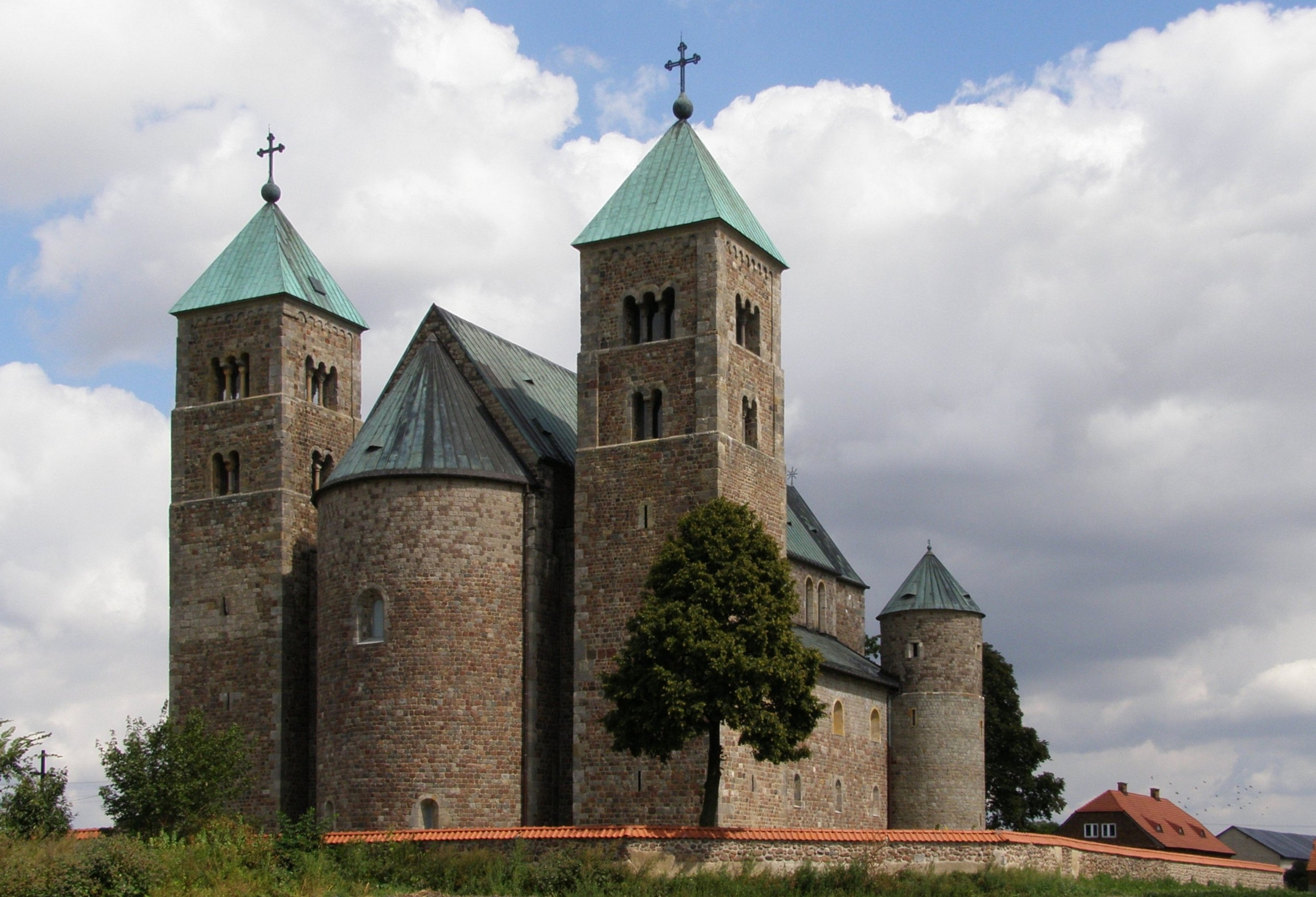
Collegiate church, Tum

- Łódzkie
  - St. Giles-Church in Inowłódz
  - Church and campanile in Krzyworzeka
  - Cistercians Abbey in Sulejów
  - St. Ursula-Church in Strońsko
  - Collegiate church in Tum
  - St. Nicholas Church in Żarnów
- Masovia
  - Masovian Blessed Virgin Mary Cathedral in Płock
  - Abbey church in Czerwińsk nad Wisłą

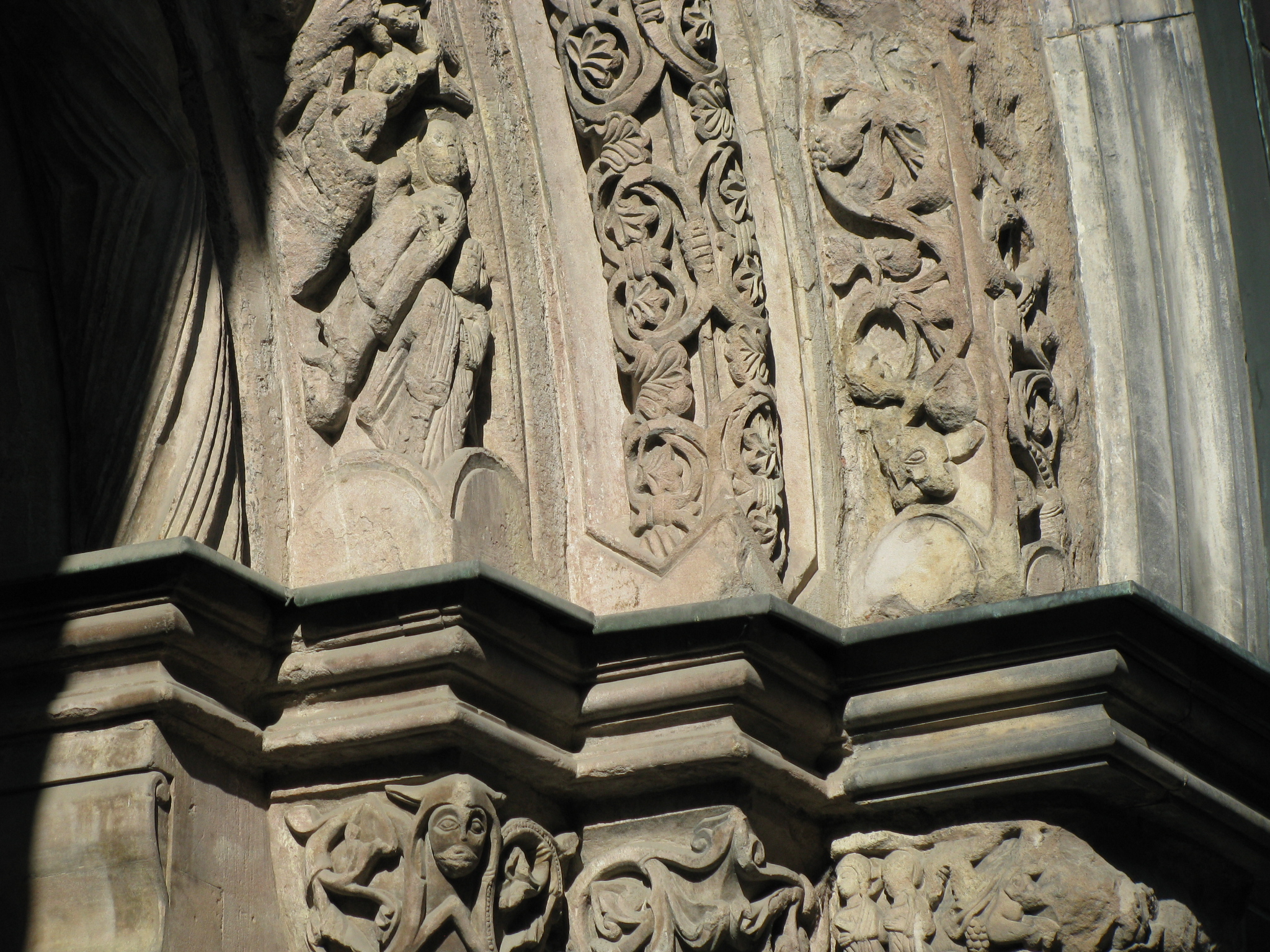
St. Mary Magdalene Church, Wrocław

- Silesia
  - Saint Godehard-Rotunda in Strzelin
  - St. Giles-Church in Wrocław
  - Romanesque House in Wrocław
  - St. Nicolaus-Rotunda in Cieszyn
  - Castle in Będzin
  - Blessed Virgin Mary-Church in Lwówek Śląski
  - Blessed Virgin Mary church in Złotoryja
  - South part and ruins of a chapel at the Piast Castle in Legnica
  - Blessed Virgin Mary church in Środa Śląska
  - St. John the Baptist church in Siewierz
- Świętokrzyskie
  - St. Martin-Collegiate in Opatów
  - St. Jacob-Church in Sandomierz
  - St. Florian-Church in Koprzywnica
  - Cistercians Abbey in Wąchock
  - St. Giles-Church in Tarczek
  - St. John the Baptist-Church in Grzegorzowice
  - St. John the Baptist church in Skalbmierz
- West Pomerania
  - Knights Templar chapel in Rurka
  - Knights Templar chapel in Chwarszczany
  - Cistercians Abbey in Kołbacz
- Ziemia Lubuska
  - Blessed Virgin Mary Church in Lubsko
  - Church in Biedrzychowice
  - St. Andrew's Church in Szprotawa

=== Portugal ===
Façade of the Old Cathedral of Coimbra (Portugal, second half of the 12th century).

- Ganfei Convent in Valença, destroyed in 1000 by the Muslims, rebuilt in 1018, façade and main chapel changed in later periods, the rest of the temple is Romanesque
- Pombeiro Monastery in Felgueiras, began in 1059, only the apse and the portal are from this period)
- Church and tower of the Travanca Monastery in Amarante, Preromanesque, Romanesque reconstruction in 1096, most of the building remained intact since the 13th century
- Lisbon Cathedral, began in 1147. Romanesque portals and nave
- Braga Cathedral, began in the first half of the 12th century. Romanesque portals and nave
- Porto Cathedral, began in the first half of the 12th century. Romanesque nave
- Castle of Almourol, built after 1160 by the Knights Templar
- Old Cathedral of Coimbra, began 1162
- Round church in the Convent of the Order of Christ in Tomar, 12th century, built by the Knights Templar
- Church of Cedofeita in Porto, second half of the 12th century
- Monastery of Rates in Póvoa de Varzim, most of the building is from the 12th century, except the main chapel
- Domus Municipalis, Bragança

=== Romania ===
- St. Michael's Cathedral, Alba Iulia, began in 1009, reconstructed 1246-1291.
- St. Michael's fortified church, Cisnădioara, late 12th century.
- Herina Evangelical Church, Herina, raised by the Order of Saint Benedict 1250-1260.
- Cluj-Mănăștur Calvaria Church, Cluj-Napoca, 9th-10th centuries, reconstructed 1896.
- Cincu Evangelical fortified church, Cincu, 13th century.
- Reformed church of Acâș, Acâș, early 13th century.
- Dormition of the Theotokos Church, Strei 1270 or middle 14th century.
- Evangelical fortified church in Vurpăr, Vurpăr, early 13th century.
- Reformed Church in Ocna Sibiului, Ocna Sibiului, 1240-1280.
- Rotunda church in Geoagiu, Geoagiu, 11th century

=== Serbia ===
- Voljavča monastery (1050)
- The Tracts of Saint George monastery, Novi Pazar (1166). See Đurđevi stupovi built by Stefan Nemanja in the 12th century.
- Đurđevi stupovi, Montenegro, founded by Stefan Prvoslav, the nephew of Stefan Nemanja in 1213.
- The Studenica monastery (1190)
- Patriarchal Monastery of Peć (13th century)
- Pridvorica Monastery (12th century)
- Žiča crowning church, Kraljevo (1217)
- Arača (around 1230)
- Mileševa monastery (1234)
- Morača (monastery) (1252)
- The Sopoćani monastery (1265)
- Gradac Monastery (1270)
- Tronoša Monastery (1276)
- Church of St. Achillius, Arilje (1296)
- Gračanica Monastery (1321)
- Visoki Dečani monastery, Kosovo (1327)
- Vojlovica monastery (1375)
- Ravanica Monastery (1375)
- Ljubostinja (1388)
- Kalenić monastery (1407)
- Church of Saint Mary, Morović

=== Slovakia ===
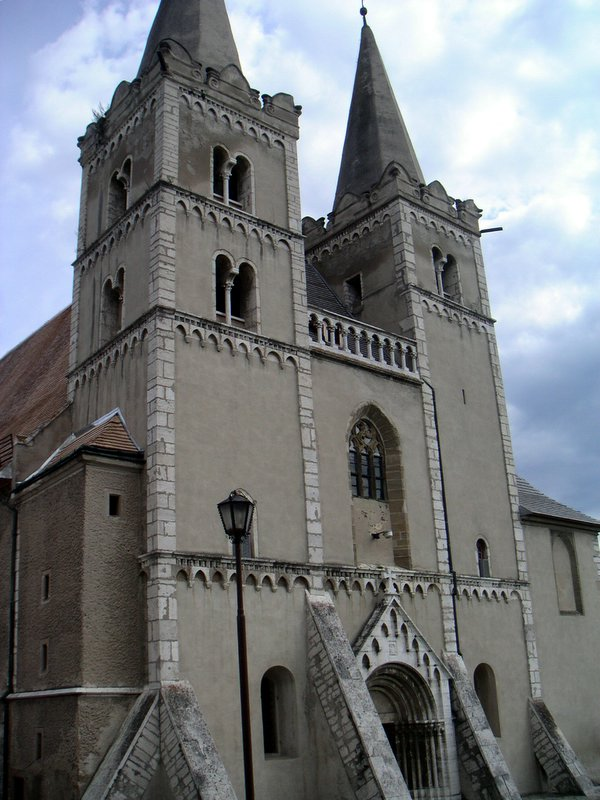
Spišská Kapitula.

During the time of early Christianity every 10 villages were ordered to build a church. Several rotunda have been built in this time.

- Boldog, Romanesque church with Gothic modifications.
- Spišská Kapitula, an ecclesiastical town with a Romanesque cathedral
- Nitra-Drazovce, a tiny Romanesque church on the hill above the village
- Levice-Kalinciakovo, a well preserved tiny Romanesque church built of hewn stone
- The Church of Saint George, Nitrianska Blatnica, the Great Moravian period or shortly after
- Haluzice, Nové Mesto nad Váhom, Romanesque church
- Sedmerovec-Pominovce
- Diakovce, Romanesque cathedral
- Boldog, Romanesque Church
- Bíňa, Premontre Abbey monastery in the romanesque style
- Veľký Klíž, Partizánske, Church
- Romanesque Church in Veľká Tŕňa
- Romanesque church in Kšinná

=== Spain ===
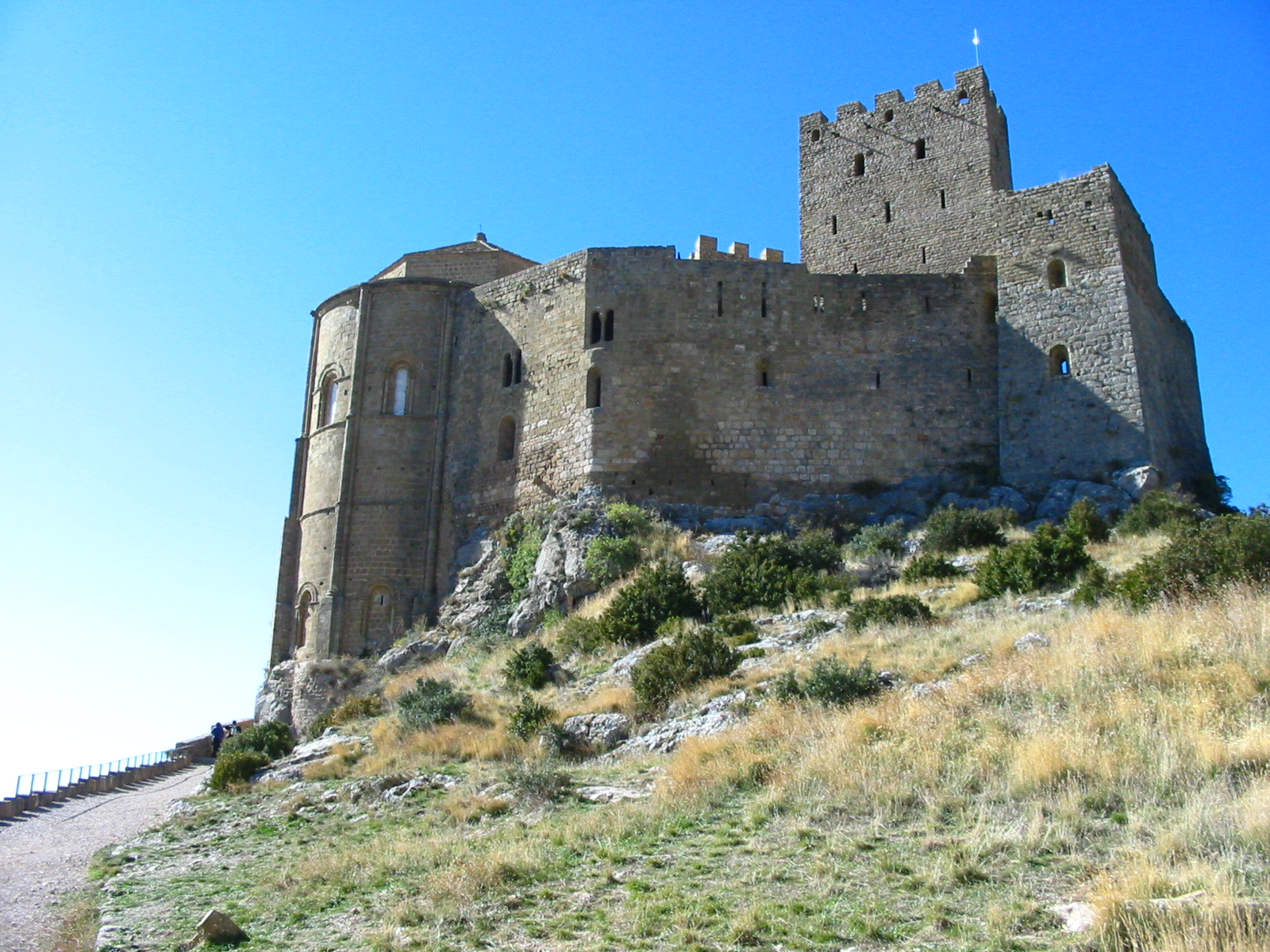
Castle of Loarre, Huesca

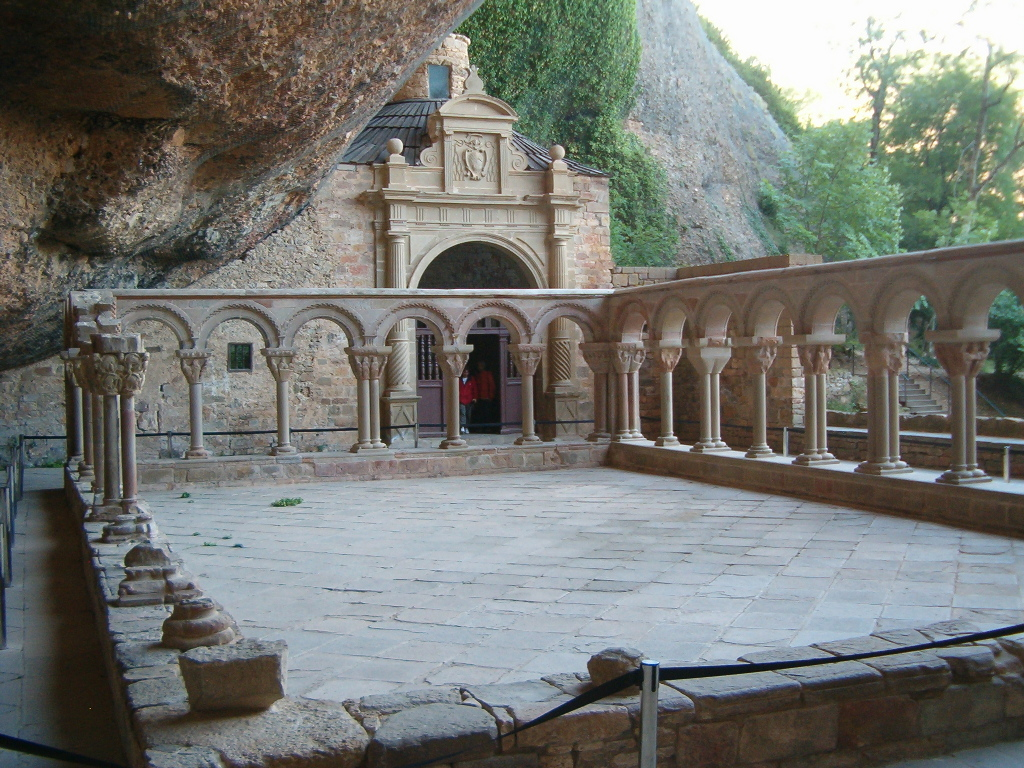
San Juan de la Peña, Huesca

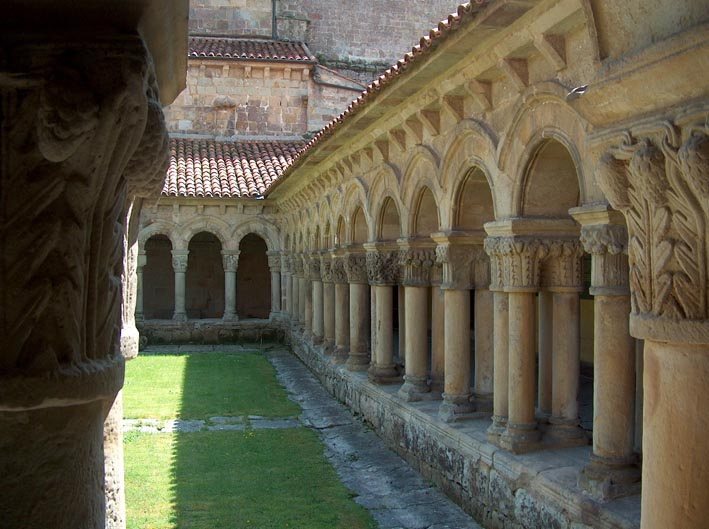
Collegiate church of Santillana del Mar, Spain. Cloister

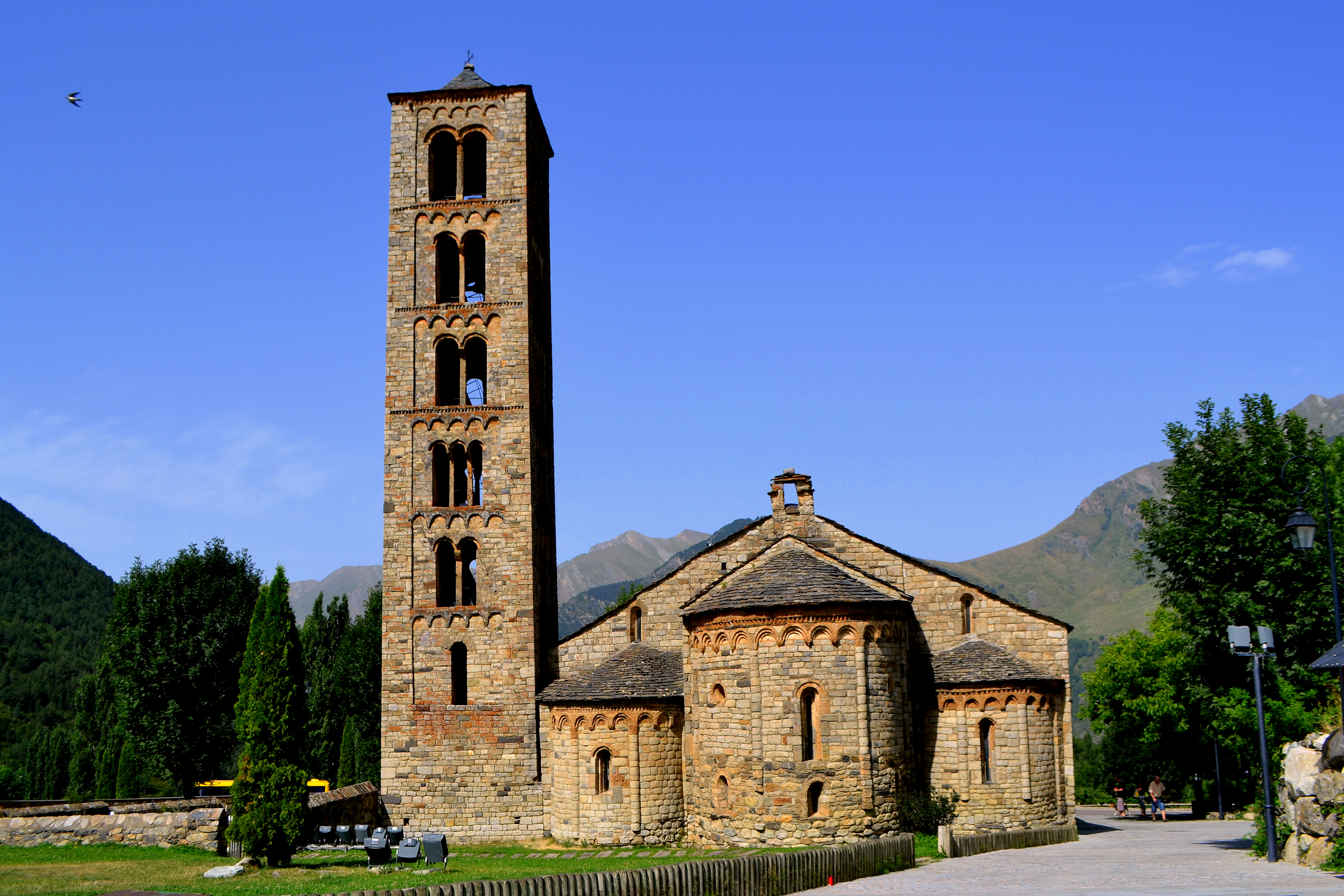
Saint Clement of Taüll in Catalonia, Spain. Lombard Romanesque

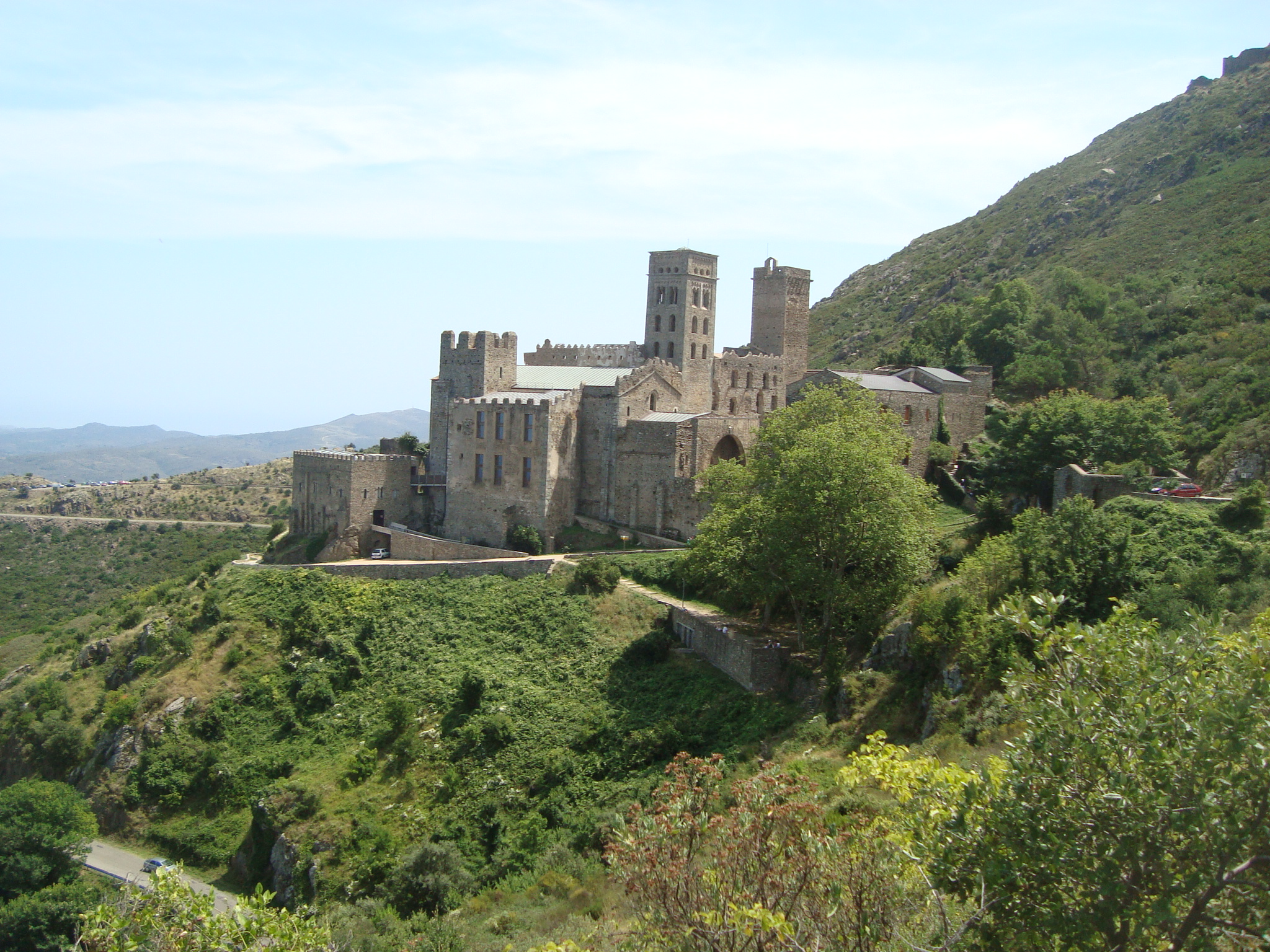
Sant Pere de Rodes, Girona

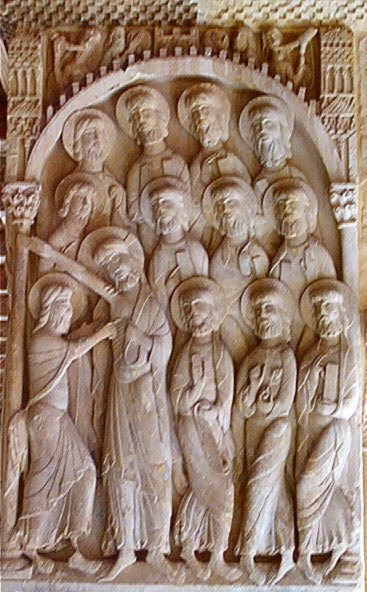
Monastery of Santo Domingo de Silos, Spain. Capitel detail

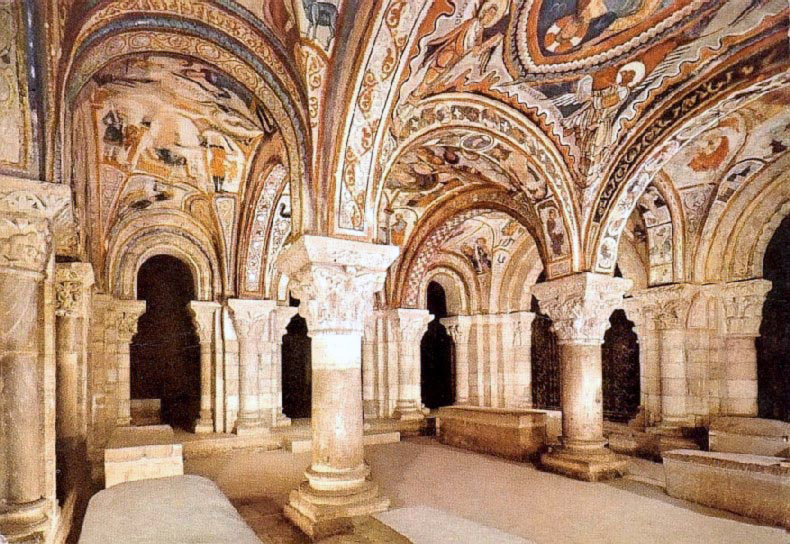
San Isidoro, León

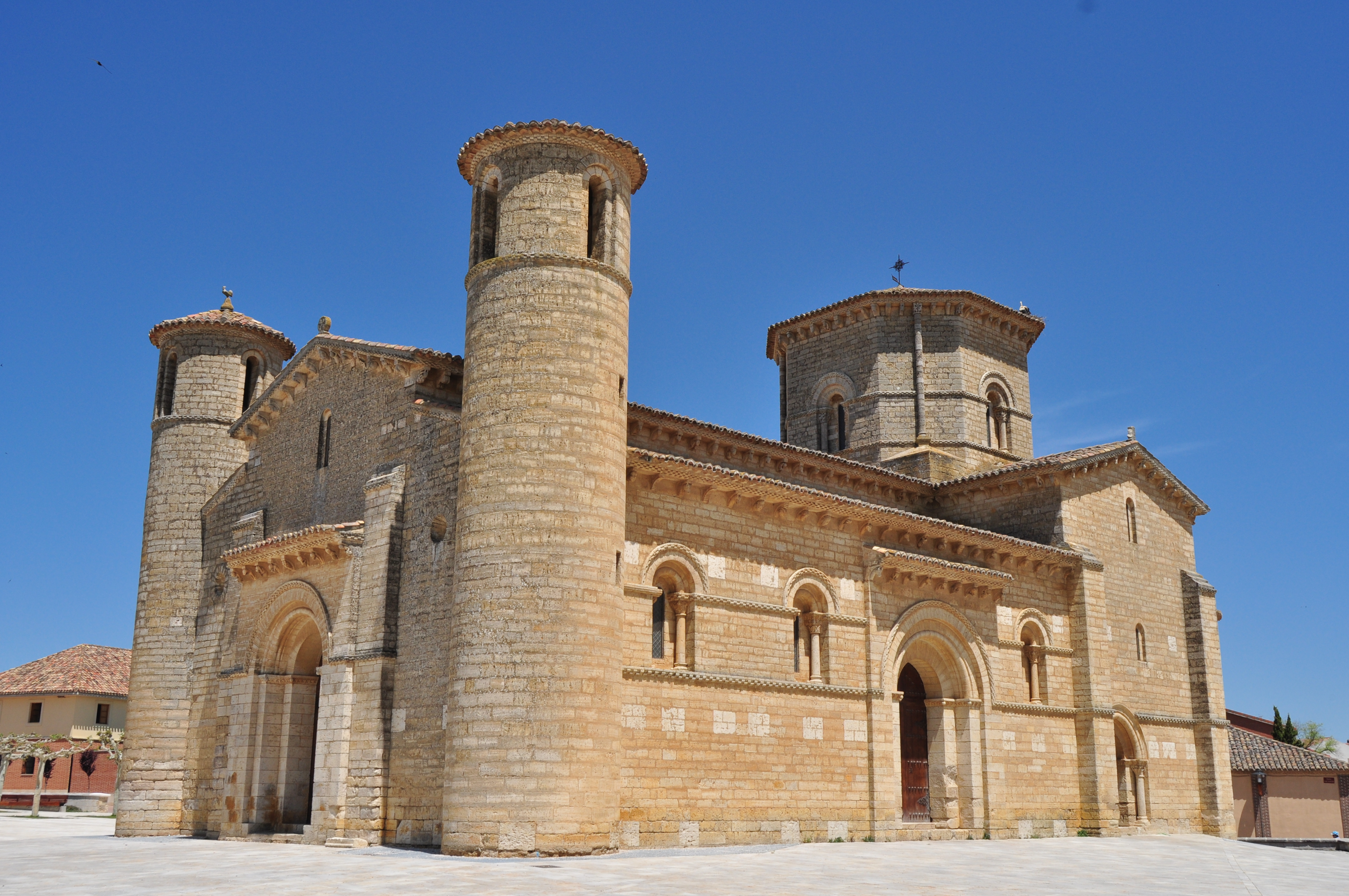
San Martín de Tours de Frómista

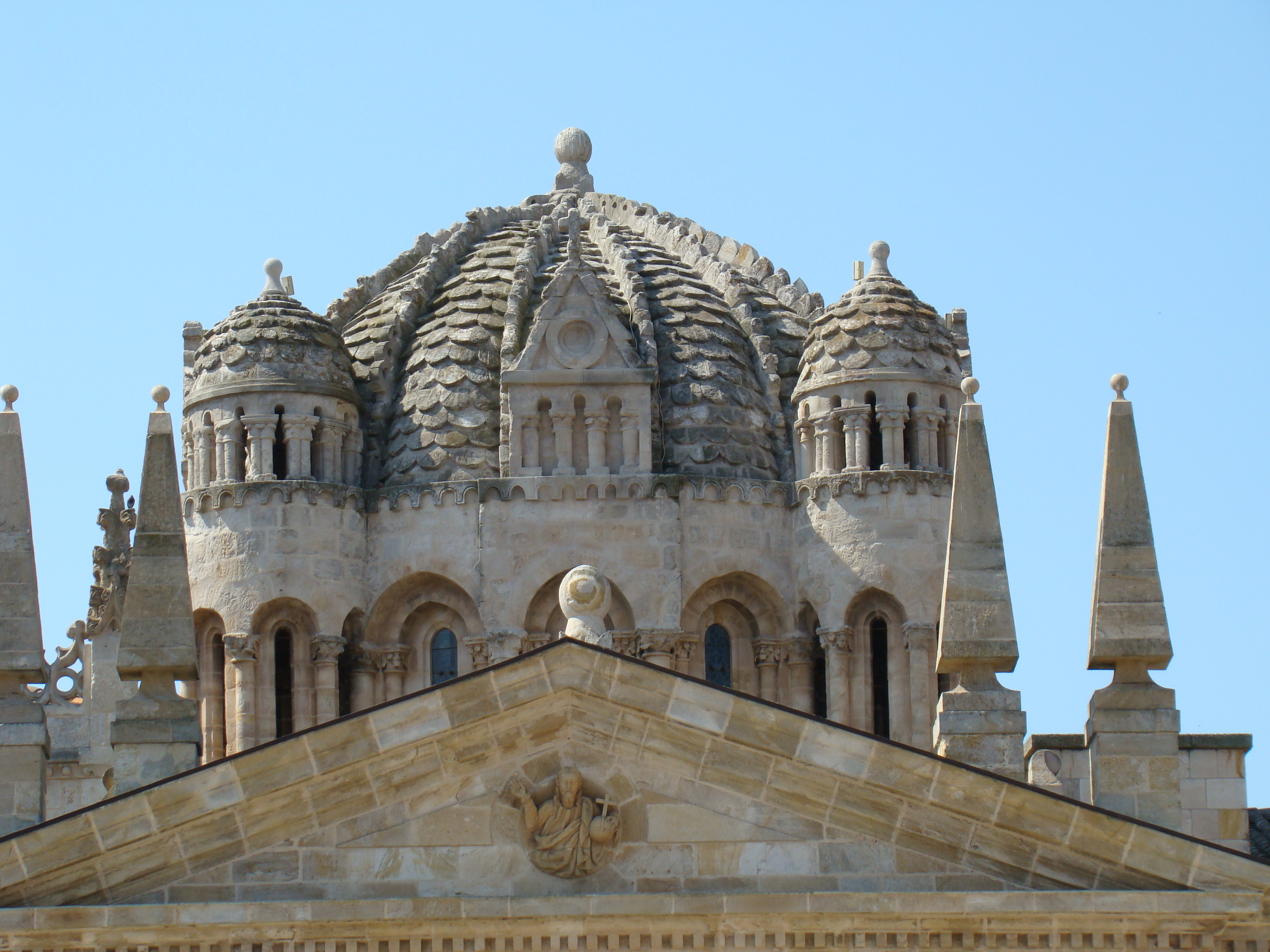
Cathedral of Zamora

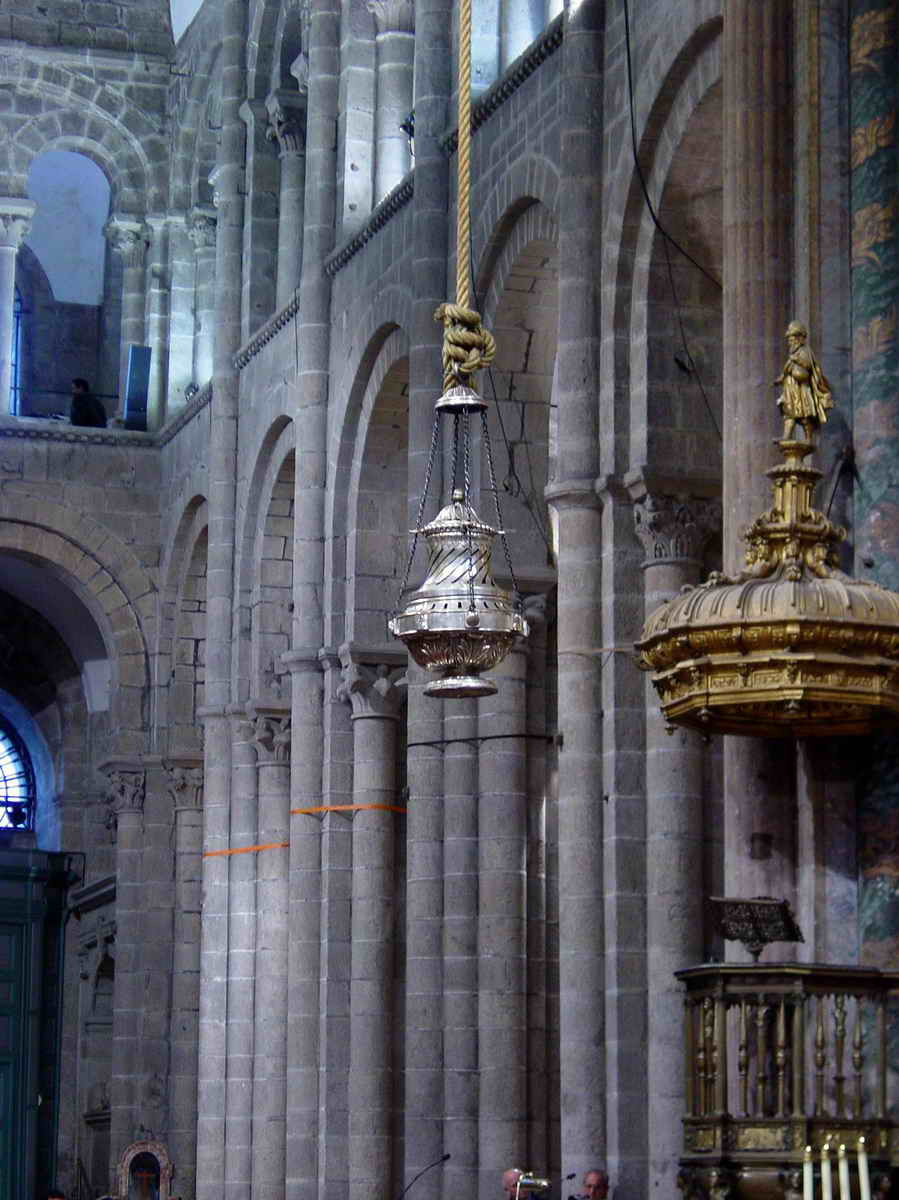
Inner view of the Cathedral of Santiago de Compostela, Spain.

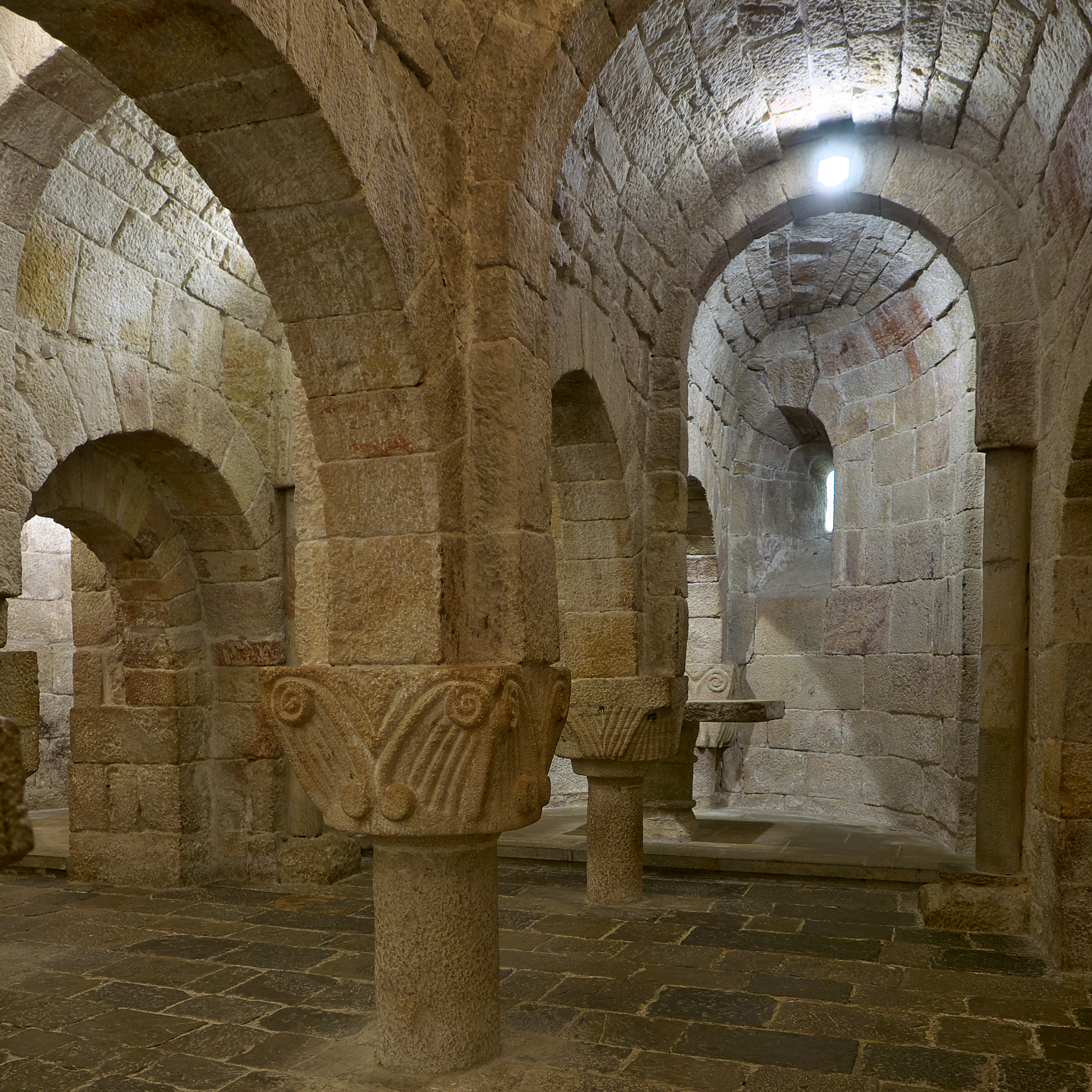
Crypt of the Monastery of Leyre, Navarra

Before Cluny`s influence, Romanesque first developed in Spain in the 10th and 11th centuries in Catalonia, Huesca and the Aragonese Pyrenees, simultaneously with the north of Italy, into what has been called "First Romanesque" or "Lombard Romanesque". It is a primitive style whose characteristics are thick walls, lack of sculpture and the presence of rhythmic ornamental arches.

Romanesque architecture truly arrives with the influence of Cluny through the Way of Saint James pilgrimage route that ends in the Cathedral of Santiago de Compostela. The model of the Spanish Romanesque in the 12th century was the Cathedral of Jaca, with its characteristic apse structure and plan, and its "chess" decoration in strips called taqueado jaqués. As the Christian kingdoms advanced towards the South, this model spread throughout the reconquered areas with some variations. Spanish Romanesque was also influenced by the Spanish pre-Romanesque styles, mainly the Asturian and the Mozarab. But there is also a strong influence from the moorish architecture, so close in space, specially the vaults of Córdoba`s Mosque, and the polylobulated arches. In the 13th century, some Romanesque churches were built with early Gothic architectural elements. Aragón, Catalonia, Castile and Navarra are the areas where numerous examples of Spanish Romanesque can be found.

==== Aragon ====
Province of Zaragoza

- Monastery of San Pedro el Viejo
- Jaca Cathedral
- Loarre castle
- San Juan de la Peña
- Churches of San Caprasio and Santa María in Santa Cruz de la Serós
- San Adrián de Sasabe
- Santa Maria de Iguacel
- Church of Santiago in Agüero
- Serrablo churches

Province of Zaragoza

- Real Monasterio de Nuestra Señora de Rueda, Aragon region

==== Cantabria ====
- Santillana del Mar Collegiate Church and cloister
- Collegiate Church of San Pedro de Cervatos

==== Catalonia ====
Province of Barcelona

- Sant Benet de Bages
- Churches of Saint Mary (old Cathedral), Saint Peter and Saint Michael in Terrassa

Province of Lleida

- Sant Climent de Taüll, Vall de Boí

Province of Girona

- Girona Cathedral
- Sant Pere de Galligants
- Sant Pere de Rodes
- Monastery of Santa Maria de Ripoll
- Sant Pere, Camprodon
- Abbey of Saint-Michel-de-Cuxa
- Sant Quirze de Colera

Province of Tarragona

- Tarragona Cathedral

==== Castile and León ====
Province of Avila

- Church of San Vicente
- Ermita de San Pelayo y San Isidoro, formerly in Ávila, moved to Madrid

Province of Burgos

- Monastery of Santo Domingo de Silos
- San Juan de Ortega Church

Province of León

- Basilica of San Isidoro, with "Royal Pantheon"
- Arbás Church

Province of Palencia

- Carrión de los Condes Church of Santiago
- Carrión de los Condes Church of Santa María de las Victorias
- Aguilar de Campoo Church of Santa Cecilia
- Monastery of Santa María la Real in Aguilar de Campoo
- Arenillas de San Pelayo Church of San Pelayo
- Barrio de Santa María Church of Santa Eulalia
- Cillamayor Church of Santa María la Real
- St. Martin, Frómista
- Olmos de Ojeda Church of Santa Eufemia
- San Salvador de Cantamuda Collegiate Church

Province of Salamanca

- Salamanca Cathedral

Province of Segovia

- Duratón La Asunción de María, church
- Fuentidueña Church of San Miguel
- Grado del Pico Church of San Pedro
- Perorrubio Church of San Pedro
- Requijada Church of Virgen de Las Vegas
- San Pedro de Gaillos Church
- Sepúlveda Church of San Salvador

Province of Soria

- Soria, Santo Domingo
- Soria San Juan de Duero, Cloister

Province of Zamora

- Zamora Cathedral
- Other Romanesque buildings in Zamora
- Benavente: Church of Santa María del Azogue
- Santa María la Mayor, Collegiate Church, Toro, province of Zamora

==== Galicia ====
Province of A Coruña

- Santiago de Compostela Cathedral
- Santiago de Compostela Gelmirez Palace
- Santiago de Compostela Santa María del Sar (Colegiata)
- A Coruña Church of Santiago
- A Coruña Collegiate Church of Santa María del Campo

Province of Lugo

- Lugo Cathedral
- Noia Church of San Martiño
- Church of San Juan of Portomarín
- Vilar de Donas, Monastery
- Sarria, Church
- Barbadelo, Church

Province of Ourense

- Cathedral, Ourense, Romanesque and Gothic

==== Madrid ====
- Church of San Juan Bautista (Talamanca de Jarama)

==== Navarra ====
- San Pedro de la Rúa. Church and cloister. Estella
- Church of San Miguel, Estella
- Palace of the Kings of Navarra, Estella
- Church of Santo Sepulcro, Torres del Río
- Monastery of Leyre (San Salvador de Leyre) Abbey
- Church of Santa María la Real, Sangüesa

=== Norway ===
- Hamar Cathedral, Hamar
- Nidaros Cathedral, Trondheim

=== Sweden ===
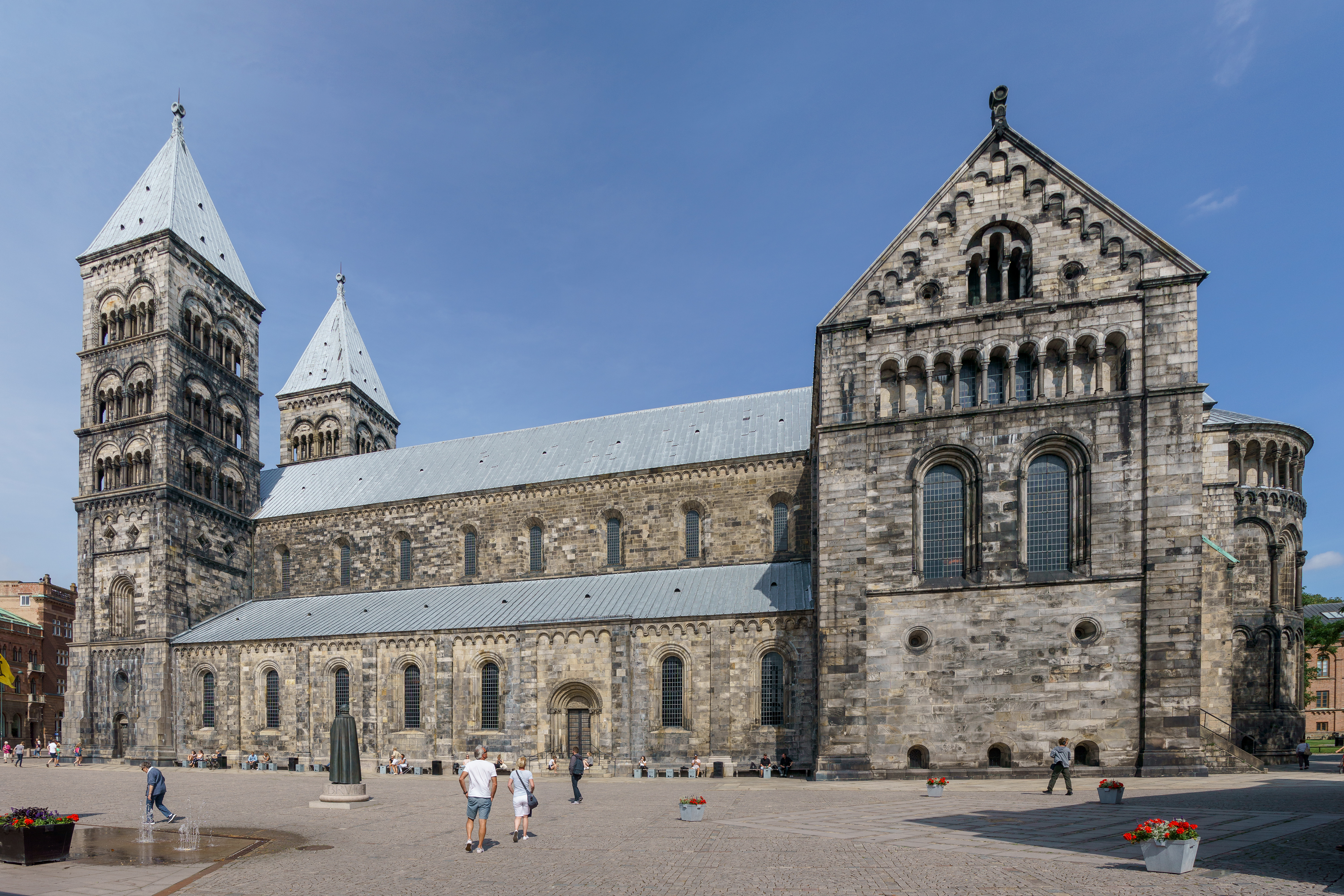
Lund Cathedral

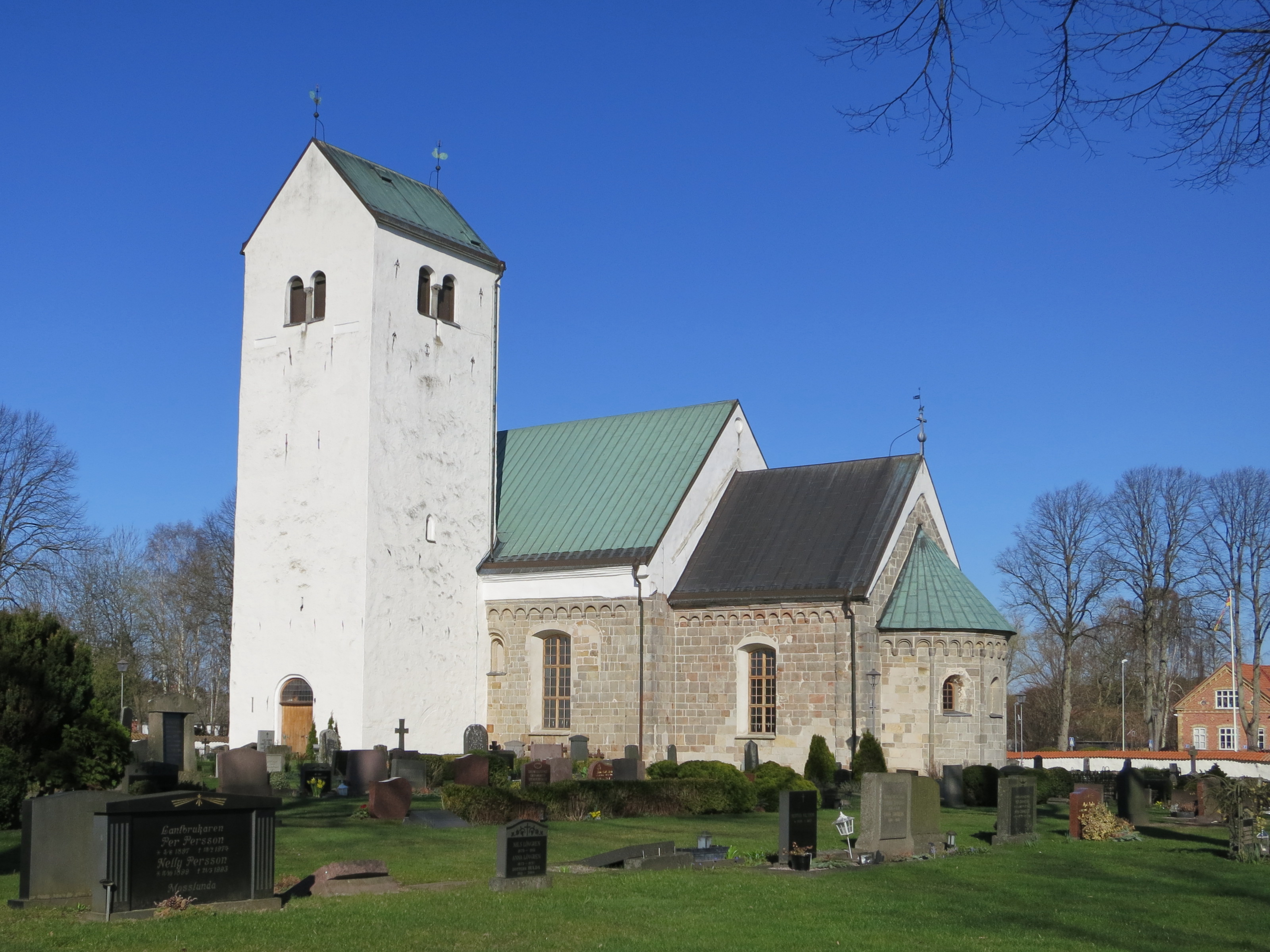
Vä Church, Sweden

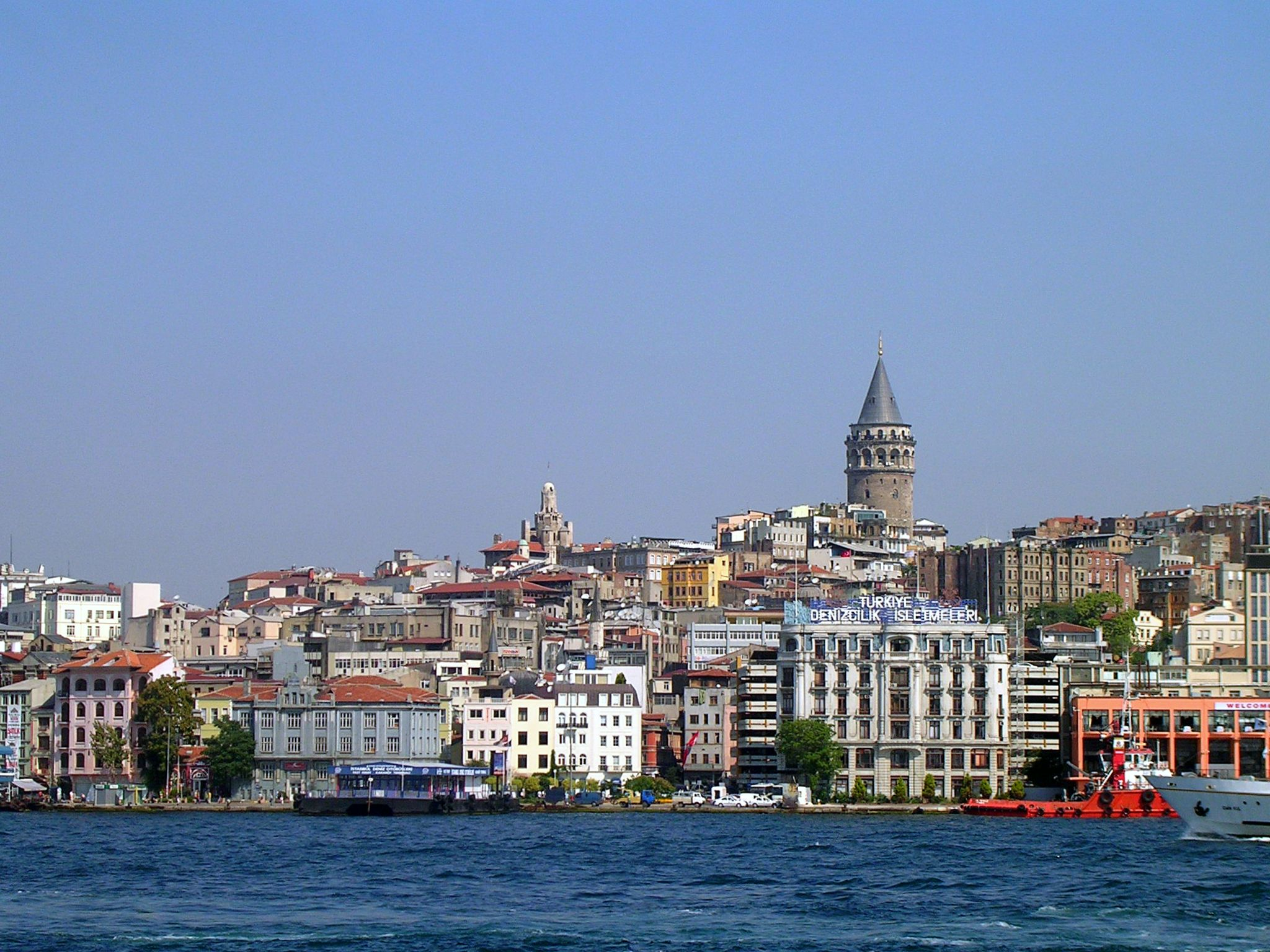
Galata Tower, Galata, Istanbul

- Akebäck Church, Akebäck
- Anga Church, Anga
- Bjäresjö Church, Bjäresjö
- Dalby Church, Dalby
- Gamla Uppsala kyrka, Gamla Uppsala
- Garde Church, Garde
- Havdhem Church, Havdhem
- Lund Cathedral, Lund
- Vä Church, Vä

=== Switzerland ===
- Abbey of Romainmôtier Abbey
- Church of Saint-Sulpice, Vaud
- Grossmünster Church, Zürich
- Münster Schaffhausen
- Payerne
- Rüeggisberg Priory

=== Turkey ===
- Galata Tower, Galata, Istanbul

=== Ukraine ===
Galicia, Galician architecture

- Saint Pantaleon Church, Shevchenkove
- Dormition Cathedral, Krylos: foundations
- Church of St. Nicholas, Lviv

=== United Kingdom ===
==== England ====
In England, Romanesque architecture is often termed 'Norman architecture'. Castles, cathedrals and churches of the Norman period have frequently been extended during later periods. It is normal to find Norman in combination with Gothic architecture.

- Durham Cathedral is regarded as the finest Norman building in England.
- Peterborough Cathedral is an intact Norman cathedral except for the early Gothic west front and late Gothic eastern ambulatory.
- Ely Cathedral: the nave is Norman and west front Norman and Transitional
- Norwich Cathedral, excluding the Gothic spire and vault
- Canterbury Cathedral: the crypt, chapels and two small towers remain from the previous building destroyed by fire.
- Hereford Cathedral
- Southwell Minster
- St Albans Cathedral
- Gloucester cathedral, the nave arcades
- Tewkesbury abbey church
- Rochester Cathedral
- St Bartholomew-the-Great, Smithfield, London
- Patrixbourne Church, Kent
- Barfrestone Church, Kent
- Tixover church
- Bradford Church of St. Chad, West Yorkshire
- Kilpeck Church
- Leominster Priory
- Oakham castle hall, a unique survival in England of the hall of a Norman fortified manor house
- Tower of London: the keep known as the White Tower
- Norwich Castle
- Ludlow Castle
- Rochester Castle, Kent
- The Holy Sepulchre, Cambridge
- Waltham Abbey Church, Essex
- St John's Priory Crypt, London

==== Scotland ====
- Dunnottar Castle, older portions as Romanesque
- Muchalls Castle, ground level groin vault course only
- Myres Castle, undercroft only survives as Romaneseque
- St. Margaret's Chapel in Edinburgh Castle

== See also ==
- Romanesque architecture
- List of regional characteristics of Romanesque churches
- Romanesque secular and domestic architecture
- Pre-Romanesque art and architecture
- Ottonian architecture
- Romanesque art
- Romanesque sculpture
- Renaissance of the 12th century
- Romanesque Revival architecture
- Medieval architecture
- Romano-Gothic architecture
