= Romanesque architecture in Poland =

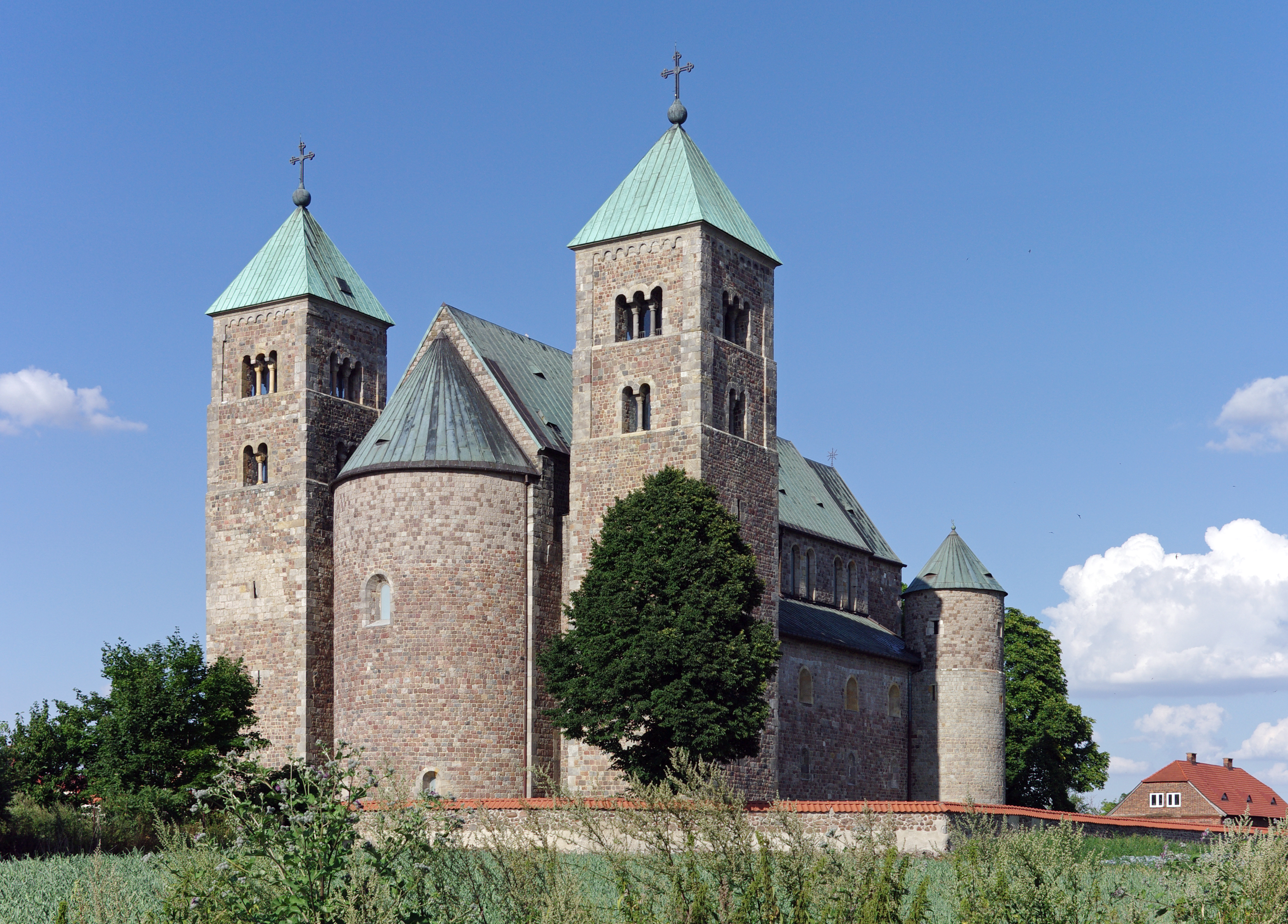
- Collegiate church in Tum, one of the best preserved Romanesque structures in Poland, listed as a Historic Monument of Poland
- Location: Poland

Romanesque architecture in Poland dates back to the 11th century to the reign of Casimir I the Restorer. It was developed in and ranging approximately from the 11th century until well into the half 13th century and it was succeeded by Polish Gothic architecture.

Romanesque style in Poland was preceded by Pre-Romanesque architecture of the early Polish state. Its prime foundations were the Wawel Cathedral in Kraków, the Gniezno Cathedral and the Poznań Cathedral (later re-built in different styles). Polish Romanesque architecture was influenced by the Polish Pre-Romanesque style. Most of Romanesque buildings in Poland can be found in Greater Poland, Kuyavia, Lower Silesia and Lesser Poland regions. Many Polish Romanesque buildings represent the characteristic Brick Romanesque style due to limited stone resources. Majority of these buildings are churches, rotundas and chapels. Most significant Polish Romanesque buildings include the Collegiate church in Tum, St. Nicholas Church in Wysocice, St. Peter and Paul-Collegiate in Kruszwica and the Saint Nicholas rotunda church in Cieszyn.

== Historic Monuments of Poland ==
A number of Romanesque structures are listed as Historic Monuments of Poland, including:

- Abbey Church, Czerwińsk nad Wisłą
- Mogiła Abbey in Kraków
- Saint Procopius church as part of the Norbertine monastery complex in Strzelno
- Sulejów Abbey
- Tum Collegiate Church
- Romanesque-Gothic Saint George church in Ziębice

== Gallery ==
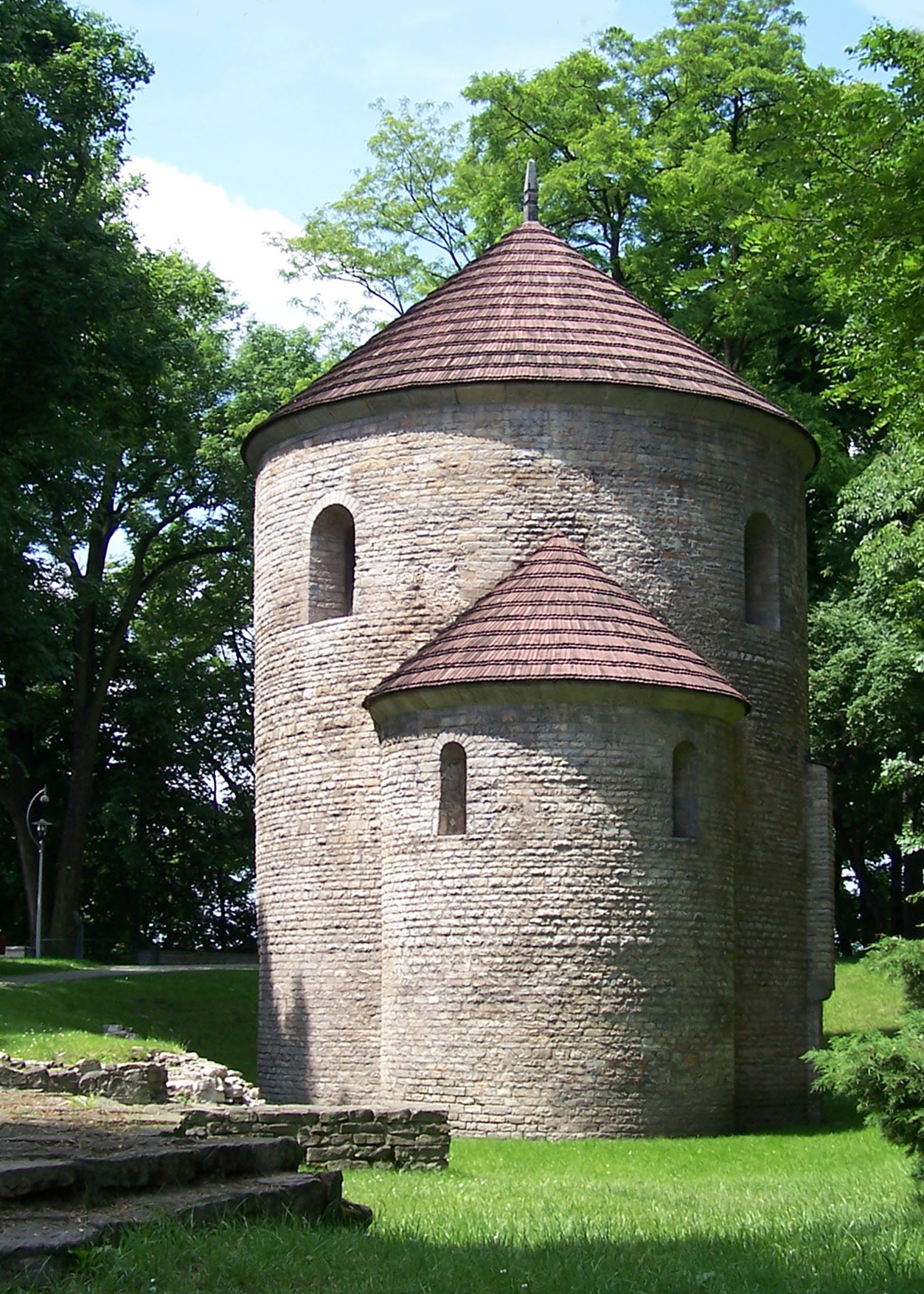
St. Nicholas rotunda church, Cieszyn, Upper Silesia

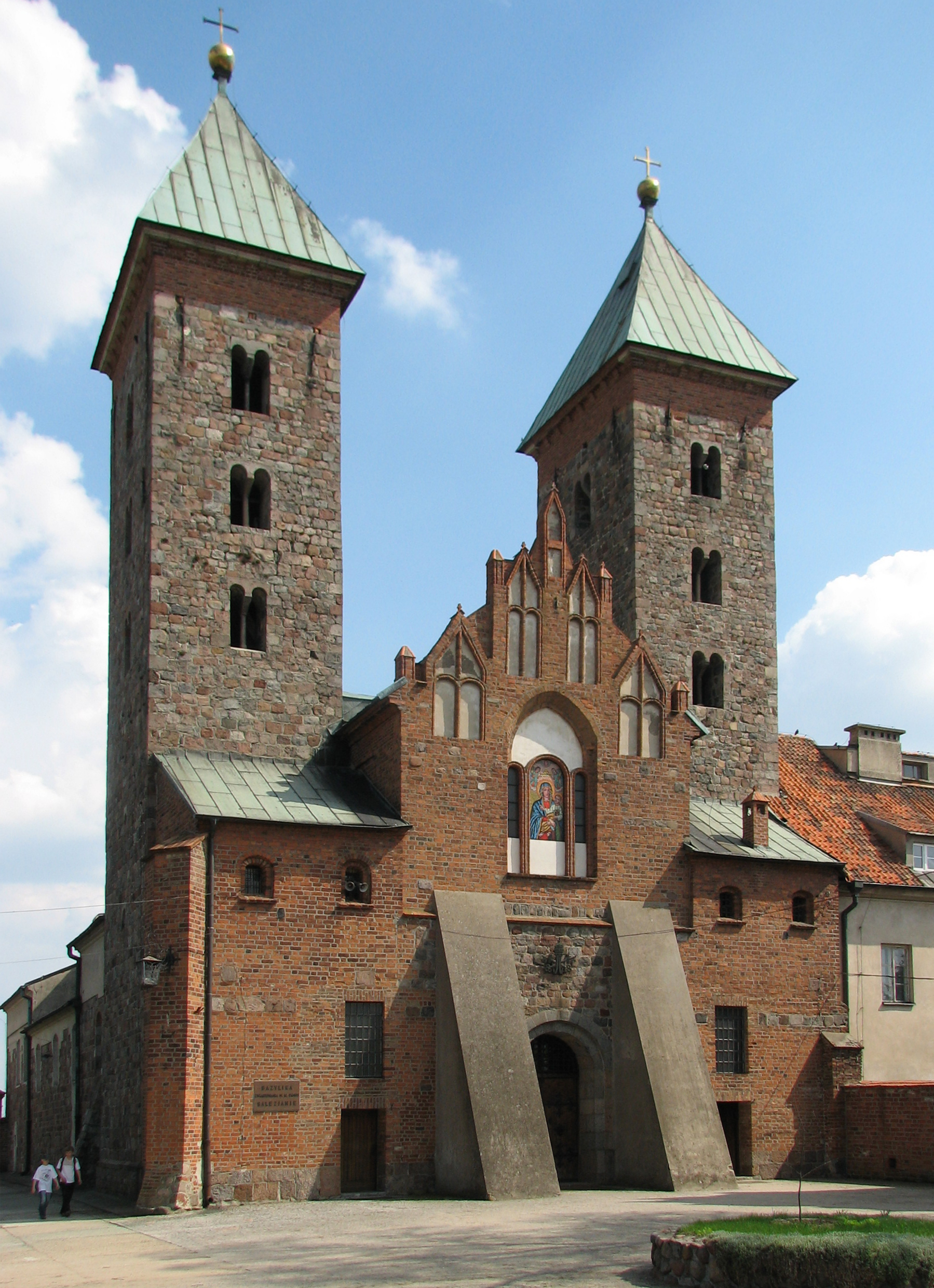
Abbey Church, Czerwińsk

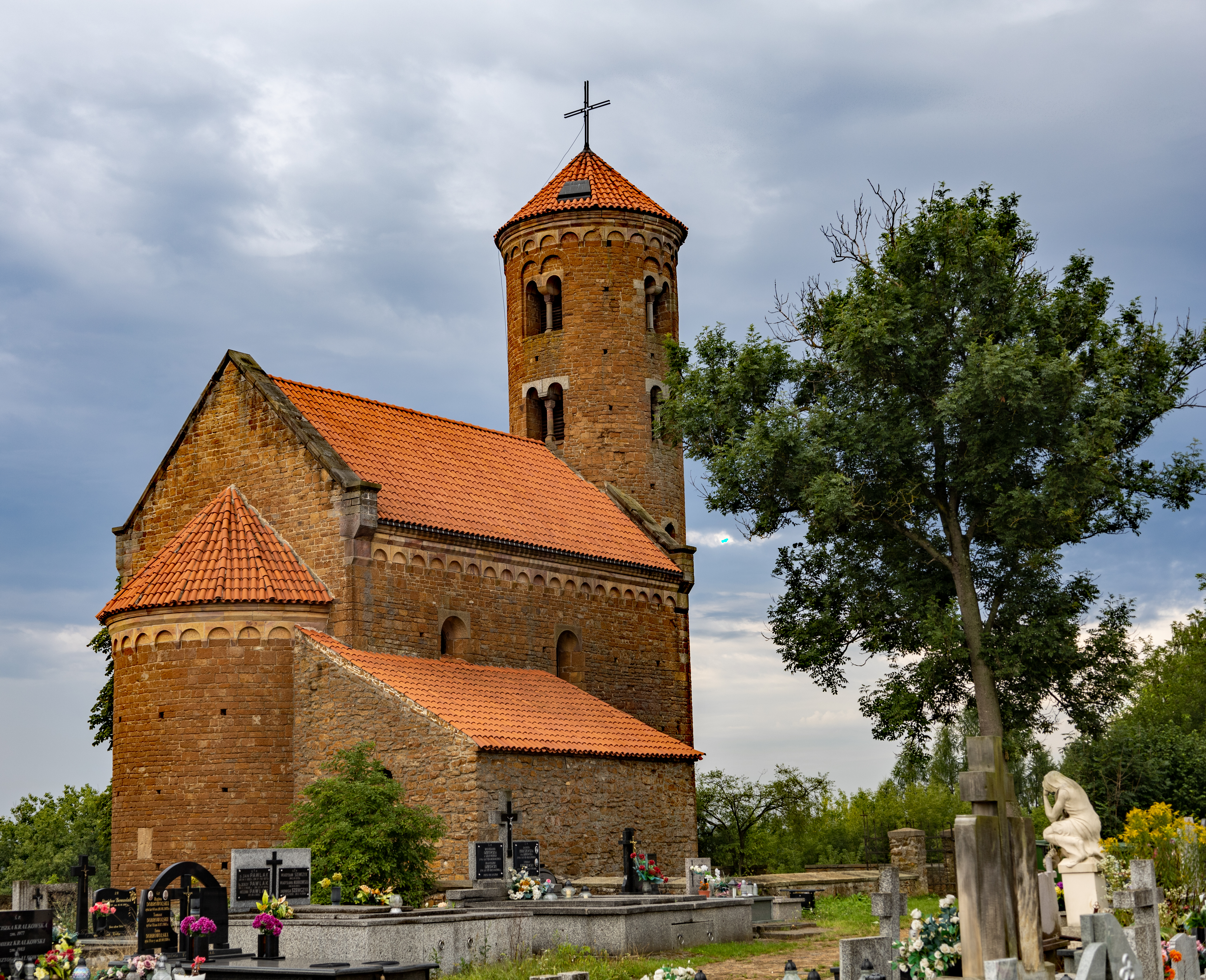
St. Giles' Church, Inowłódz

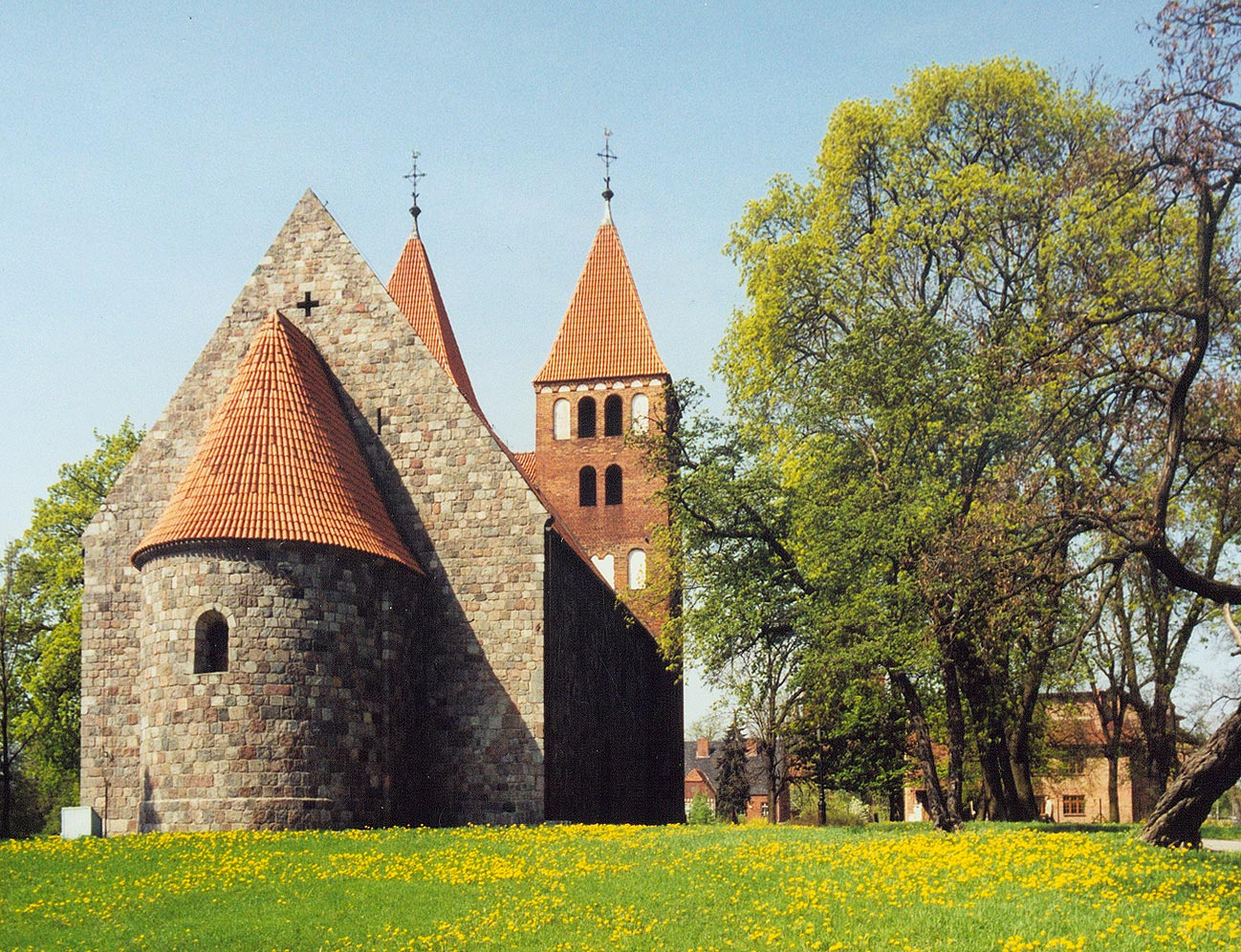
Holy Name of Mary church, Inowrocław, Kuyavia

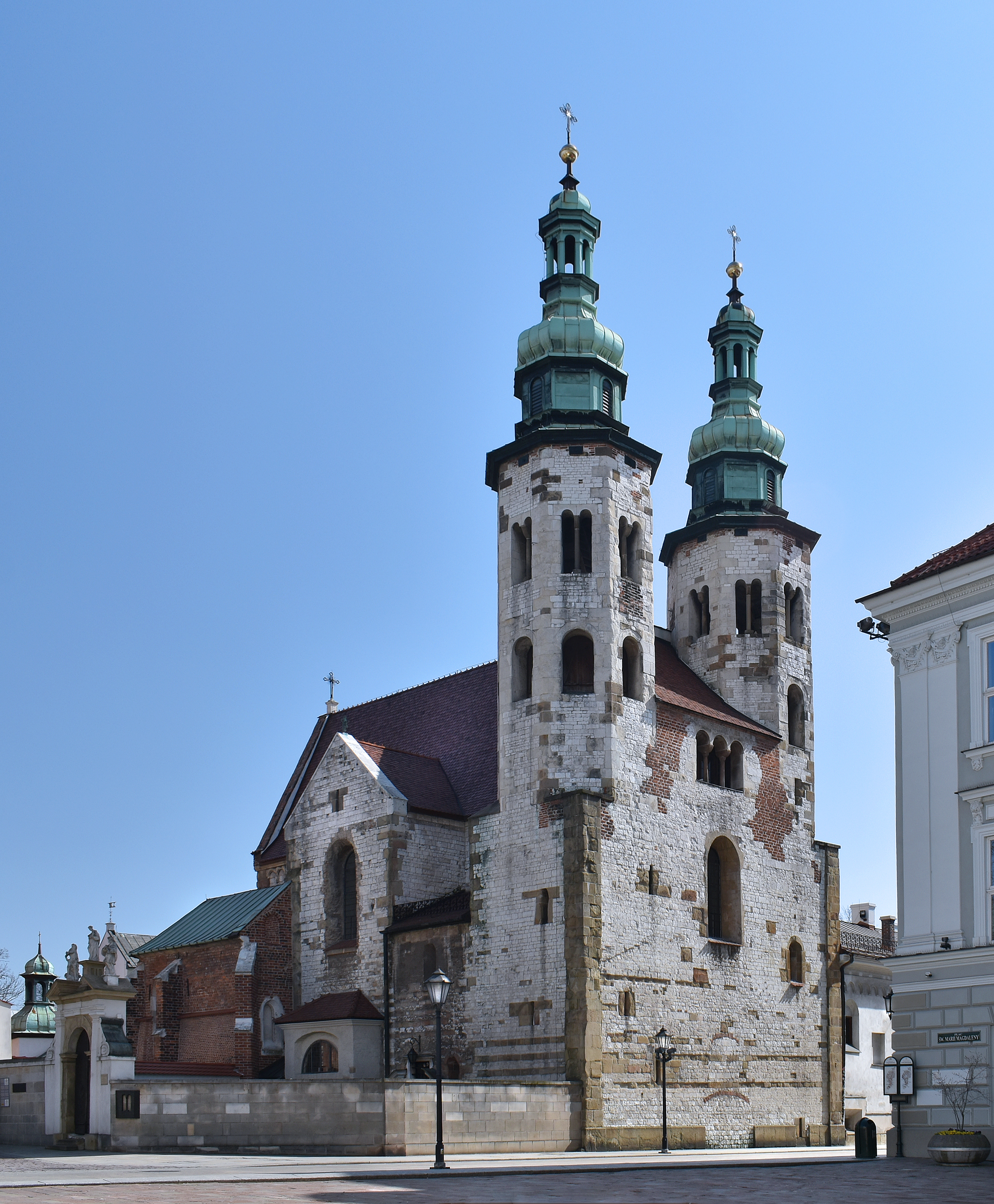
St. Andrew's Church, Kraków, Lesser Poland

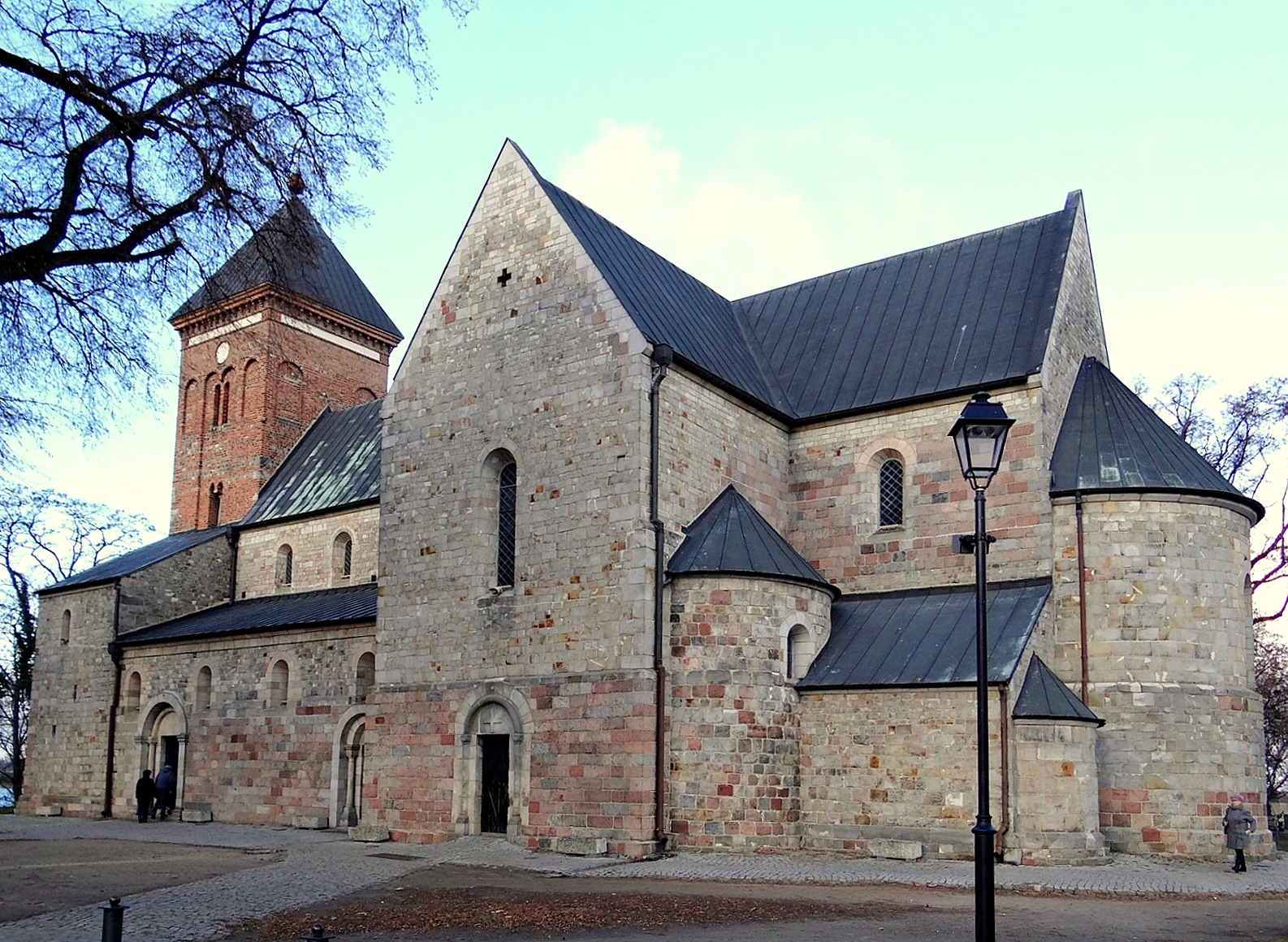
St. Peter and Paul-Collegiate, Kruszwica, Kuyavia

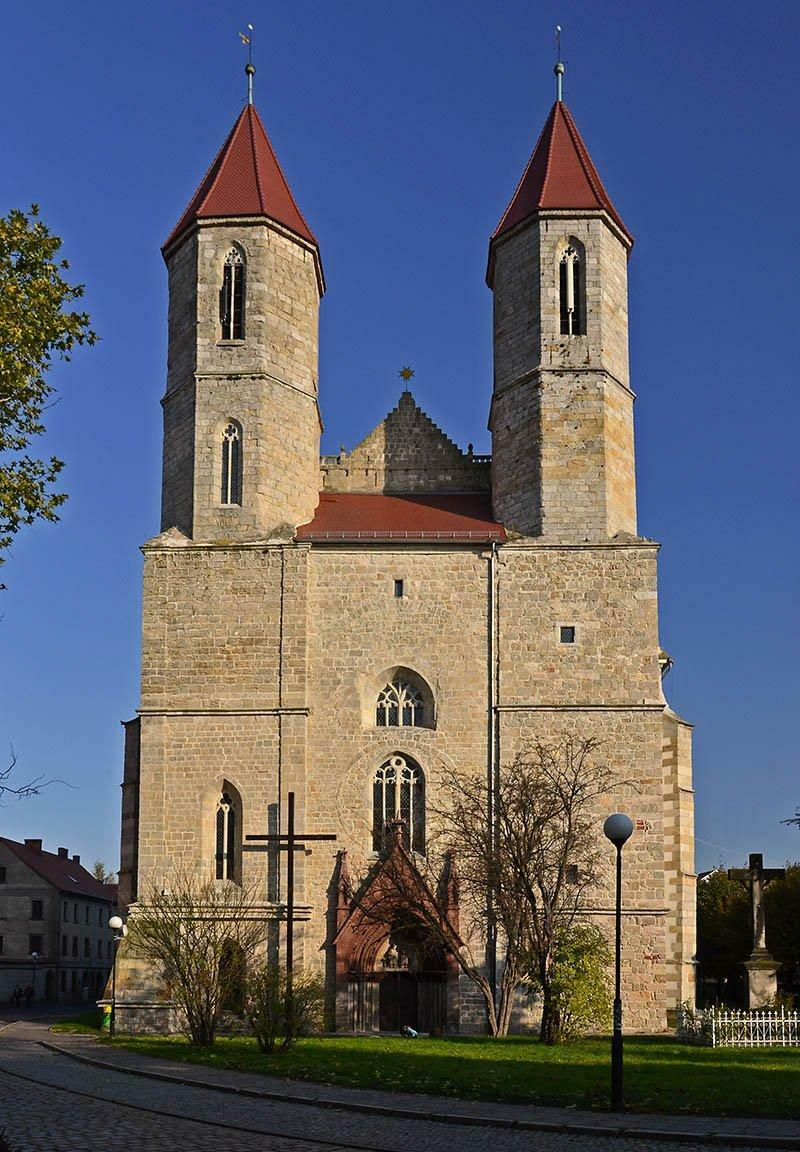
West façade of St. Mary Church in Lwówek Śląski, Lower Silesia

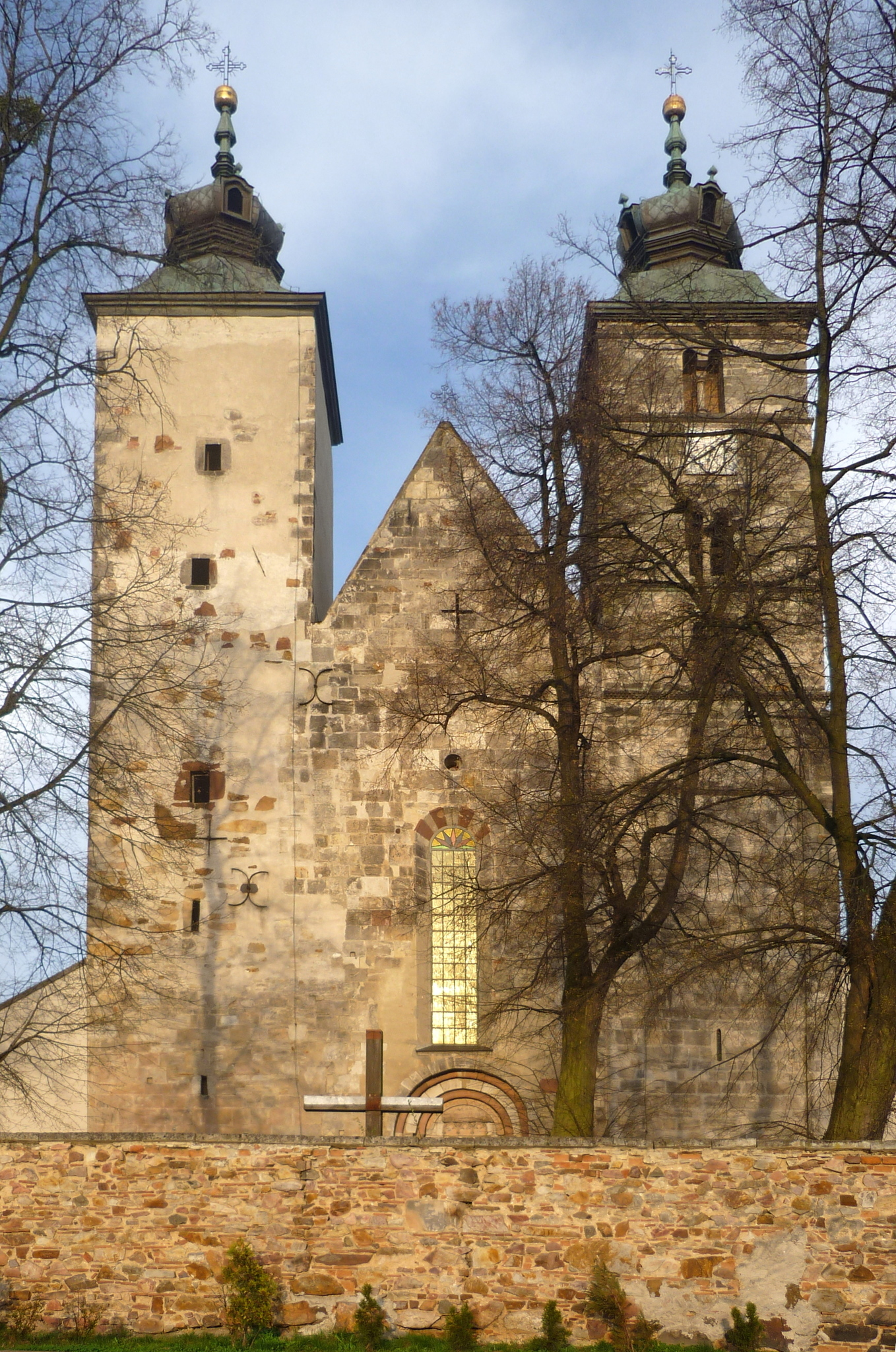
St Martin's Collegiate Church, Opatów, Lesser Poland

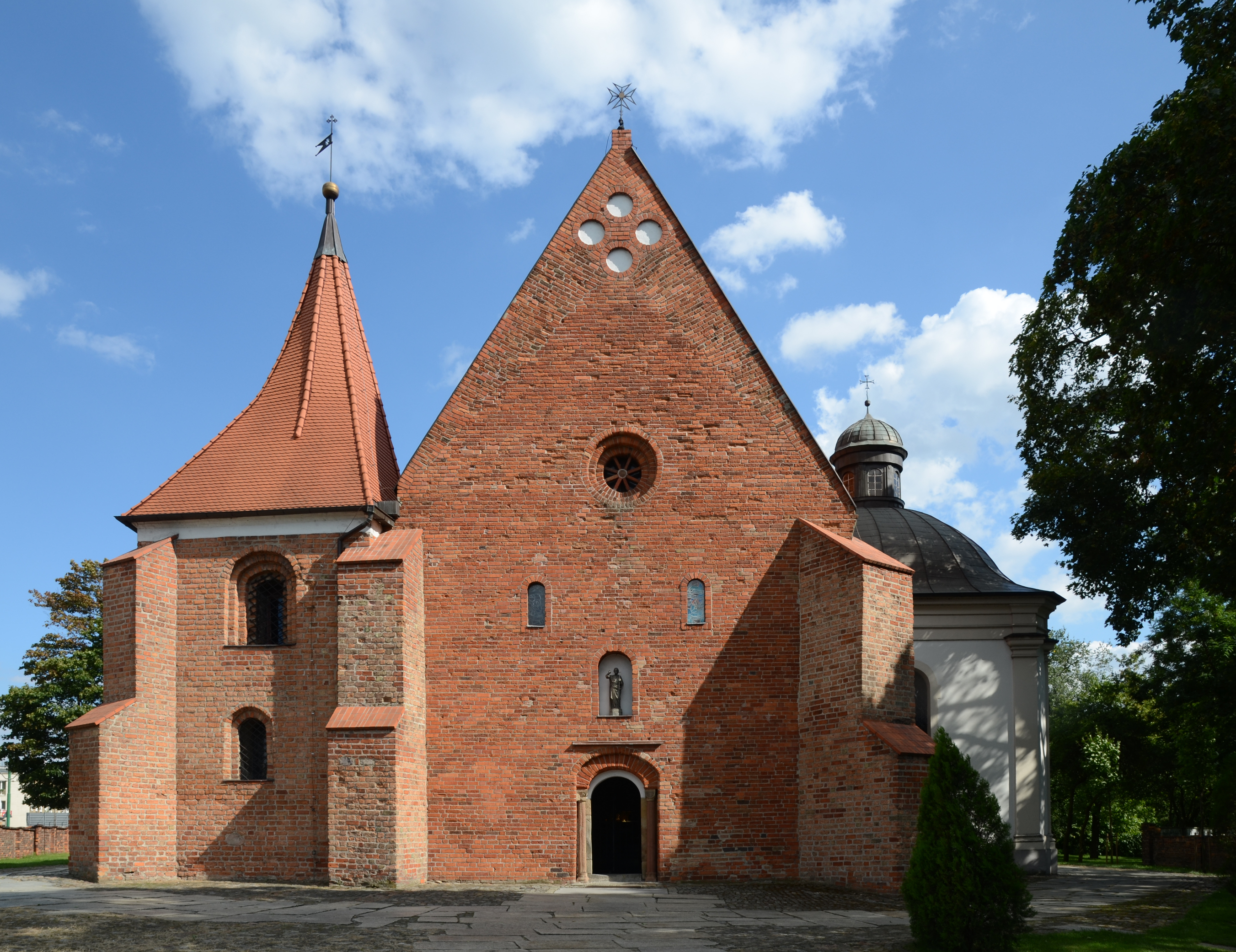
Church of St. John of Jerusalem Outside the Walls, Poznań, Greater Poland

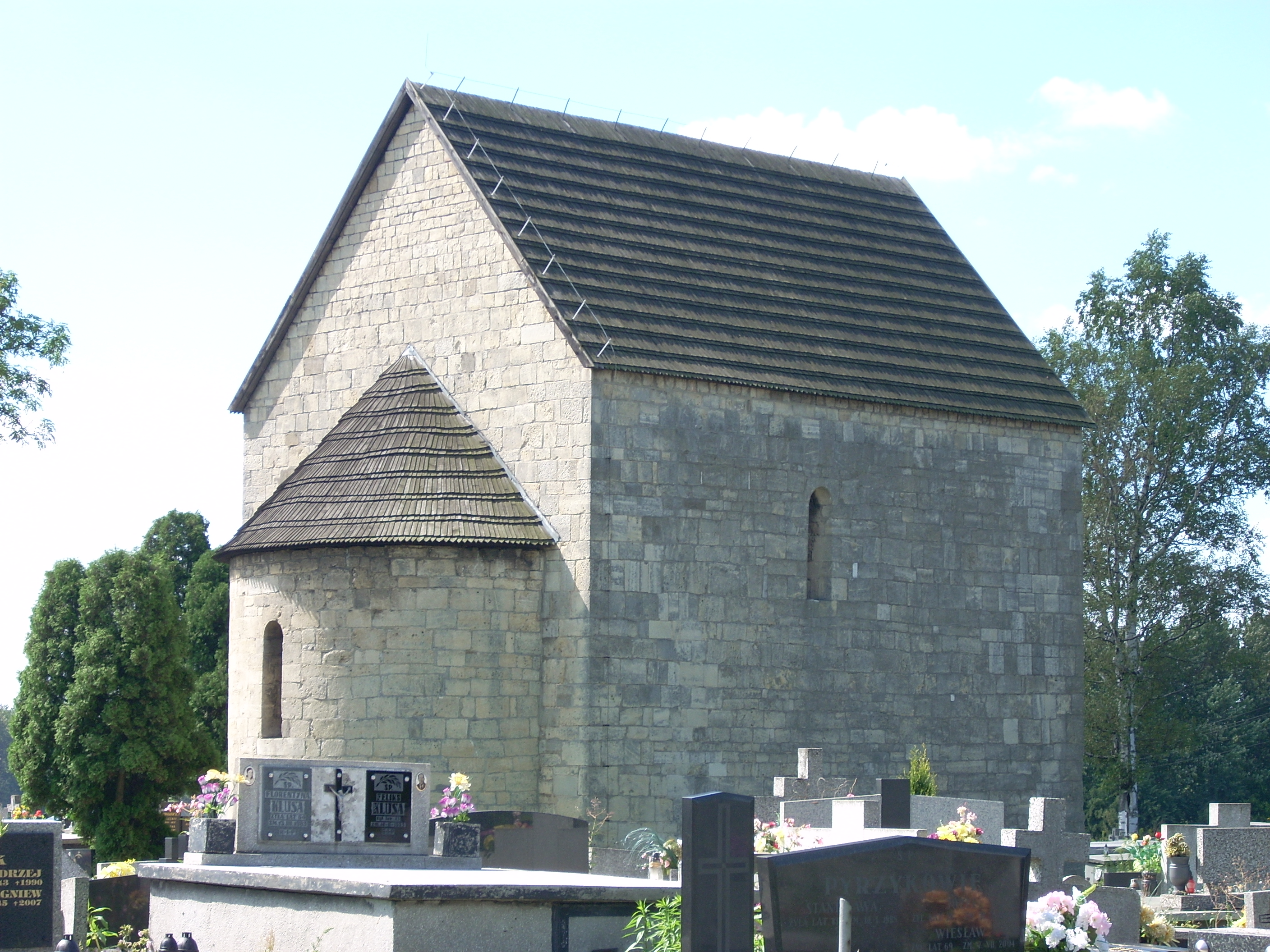
Church of St. John, Siewierz, Lesser Poland

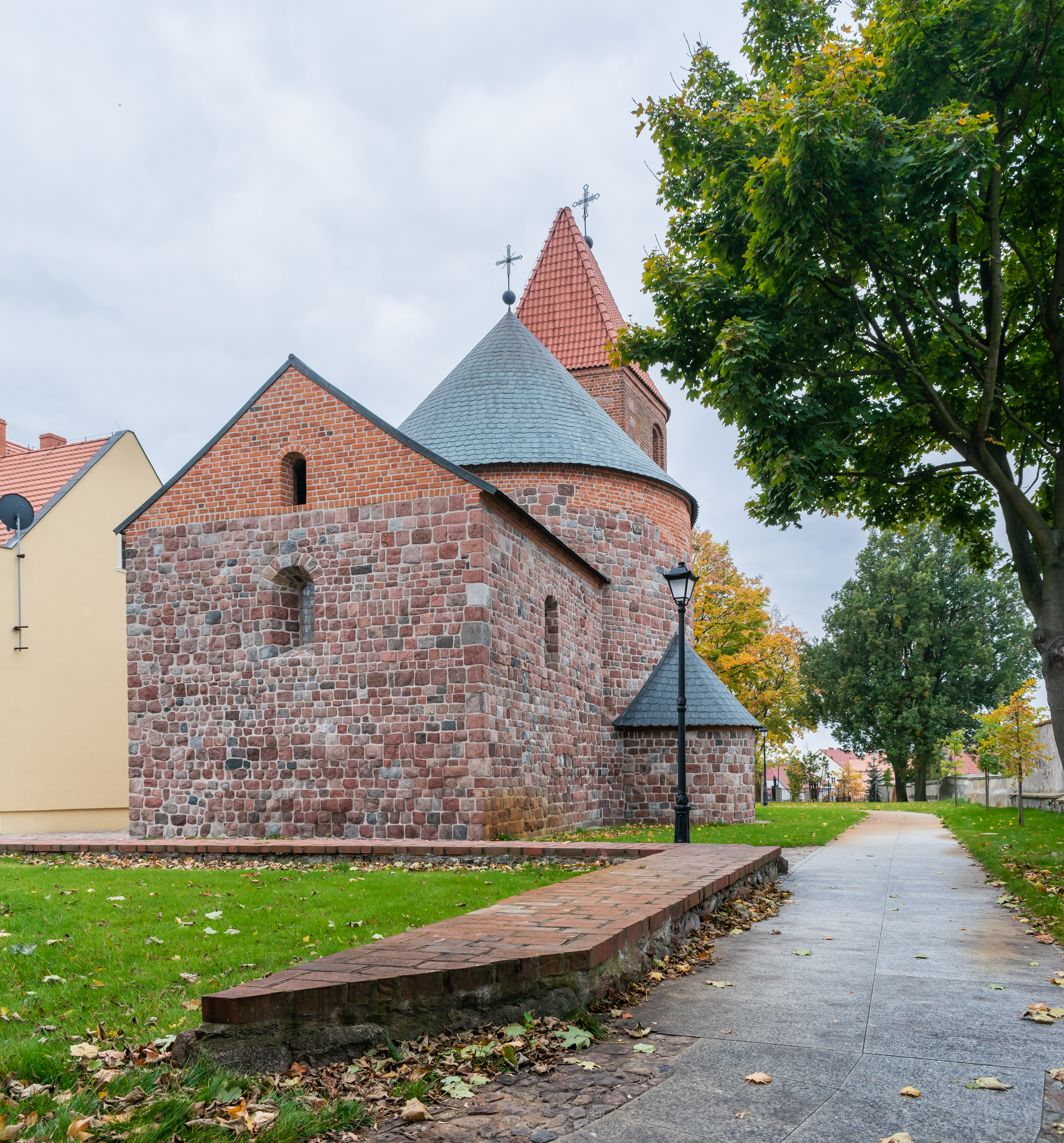
Saint Procopius Church, Strzelno, Kuyavia

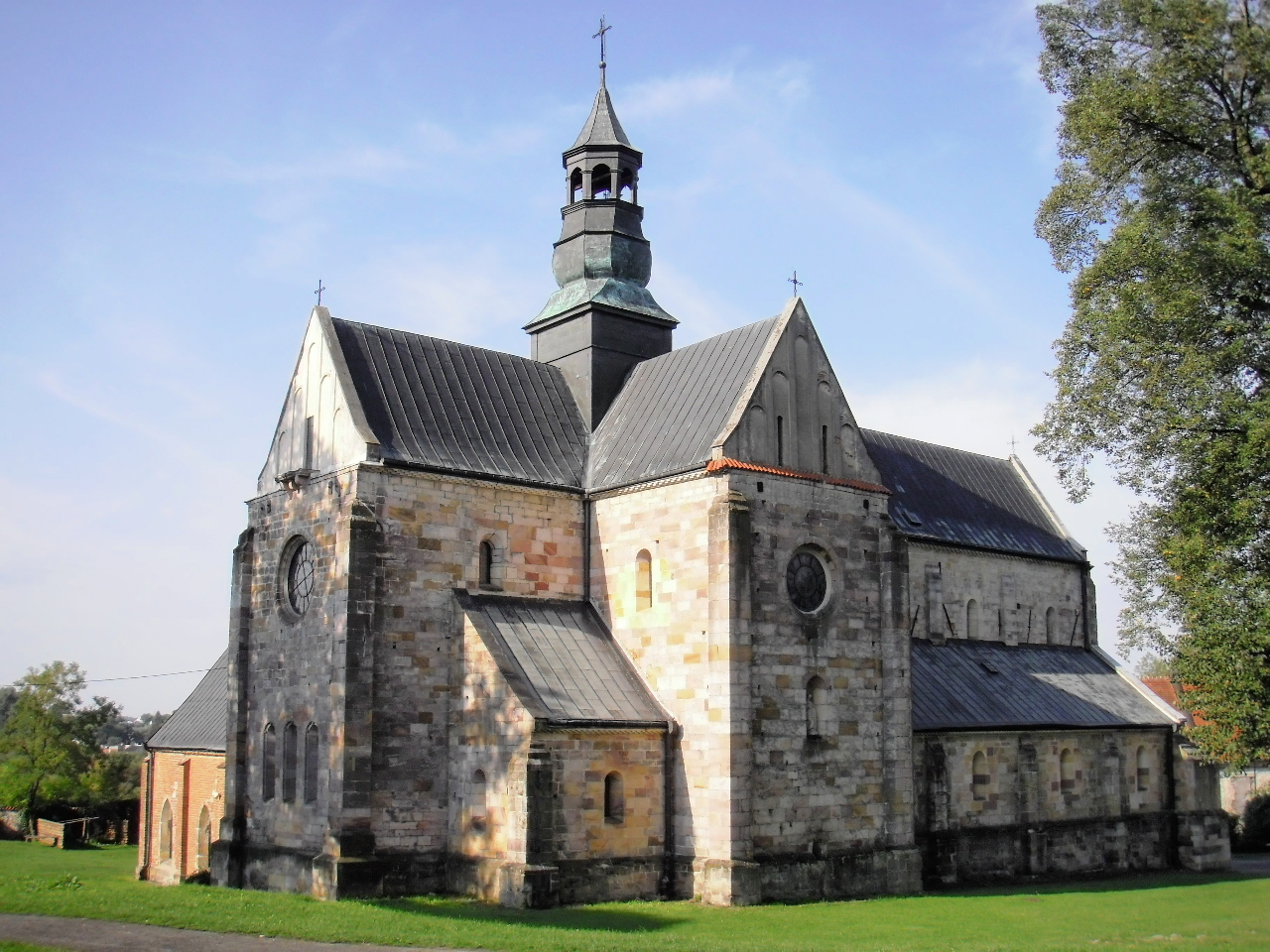
St. Thomas of Canterbury church, Sulejów Abbey

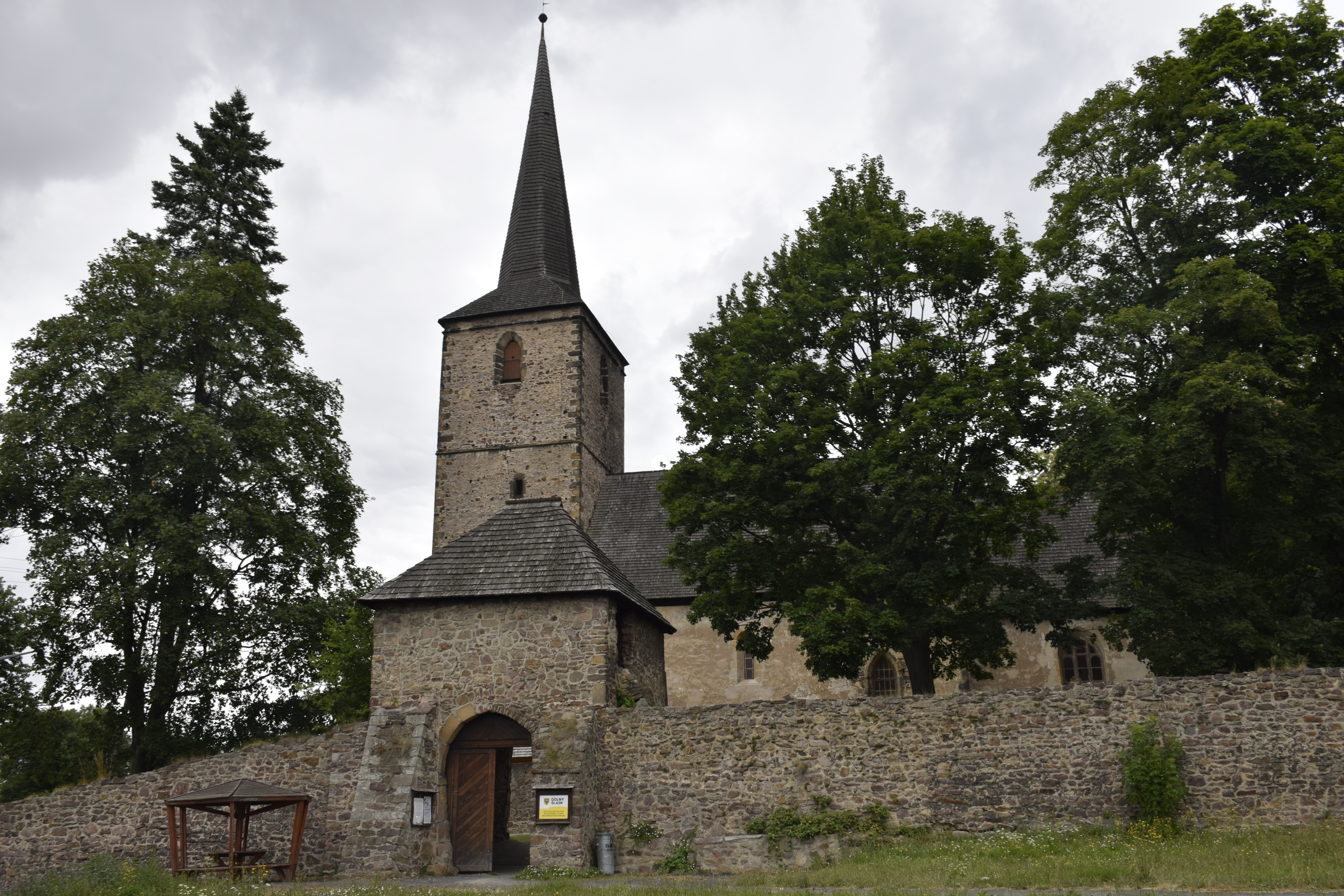
Saints John and Catherine church, Świerzawa, Lower Silesia

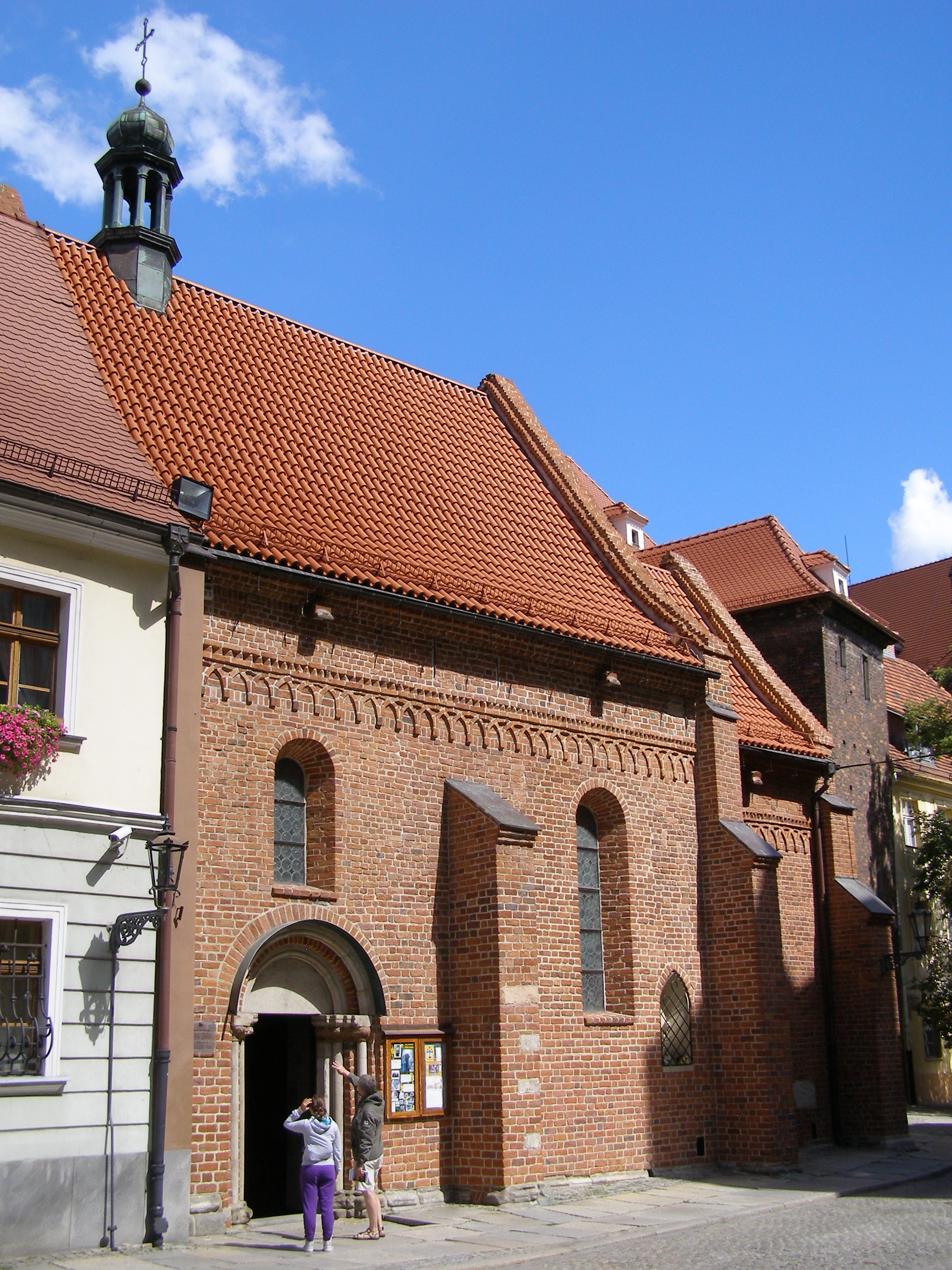
Saint Giles church, Wrocław, Lower Silesia

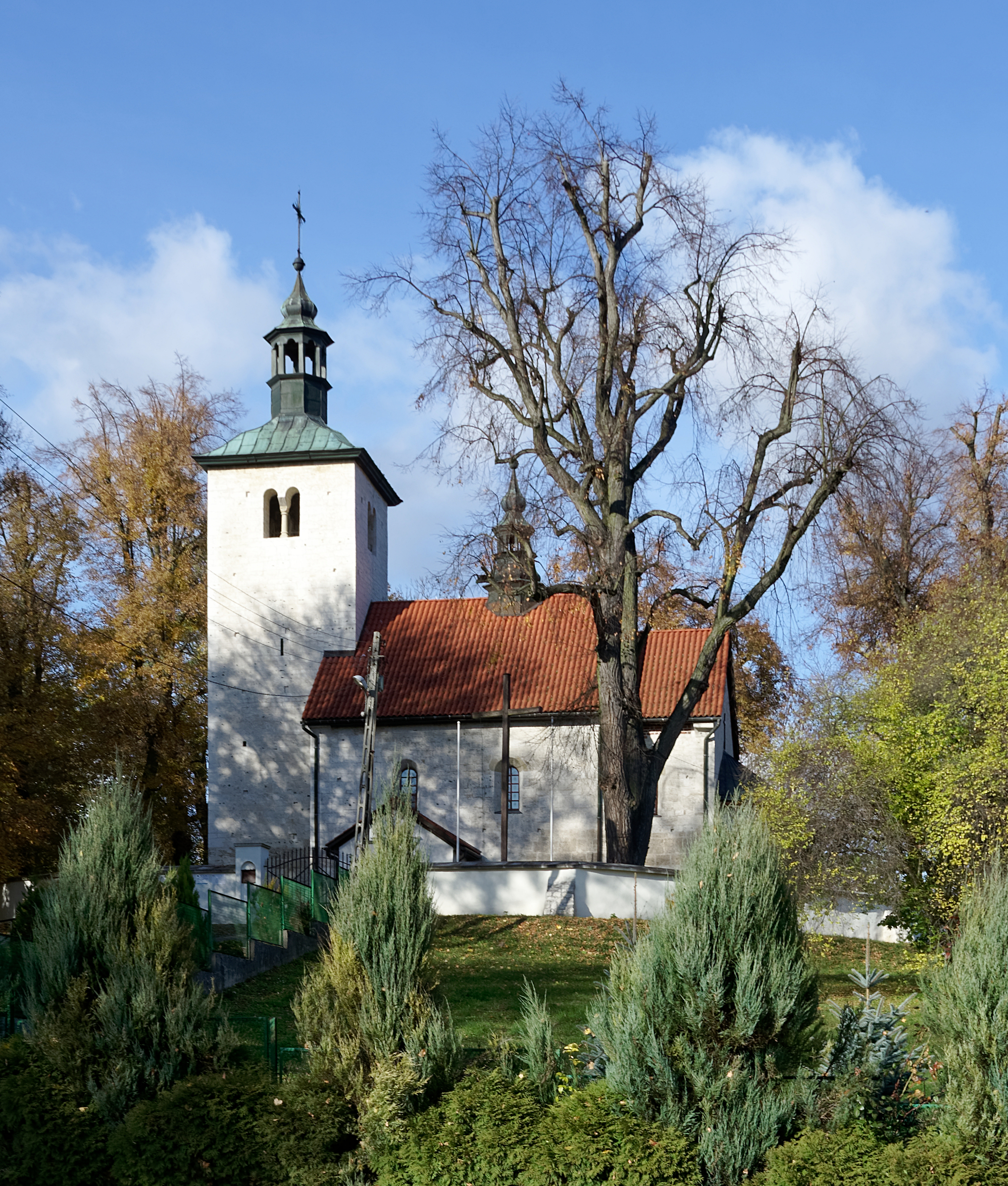
St. Nicholas Church, Wysocice, Lesser Poland

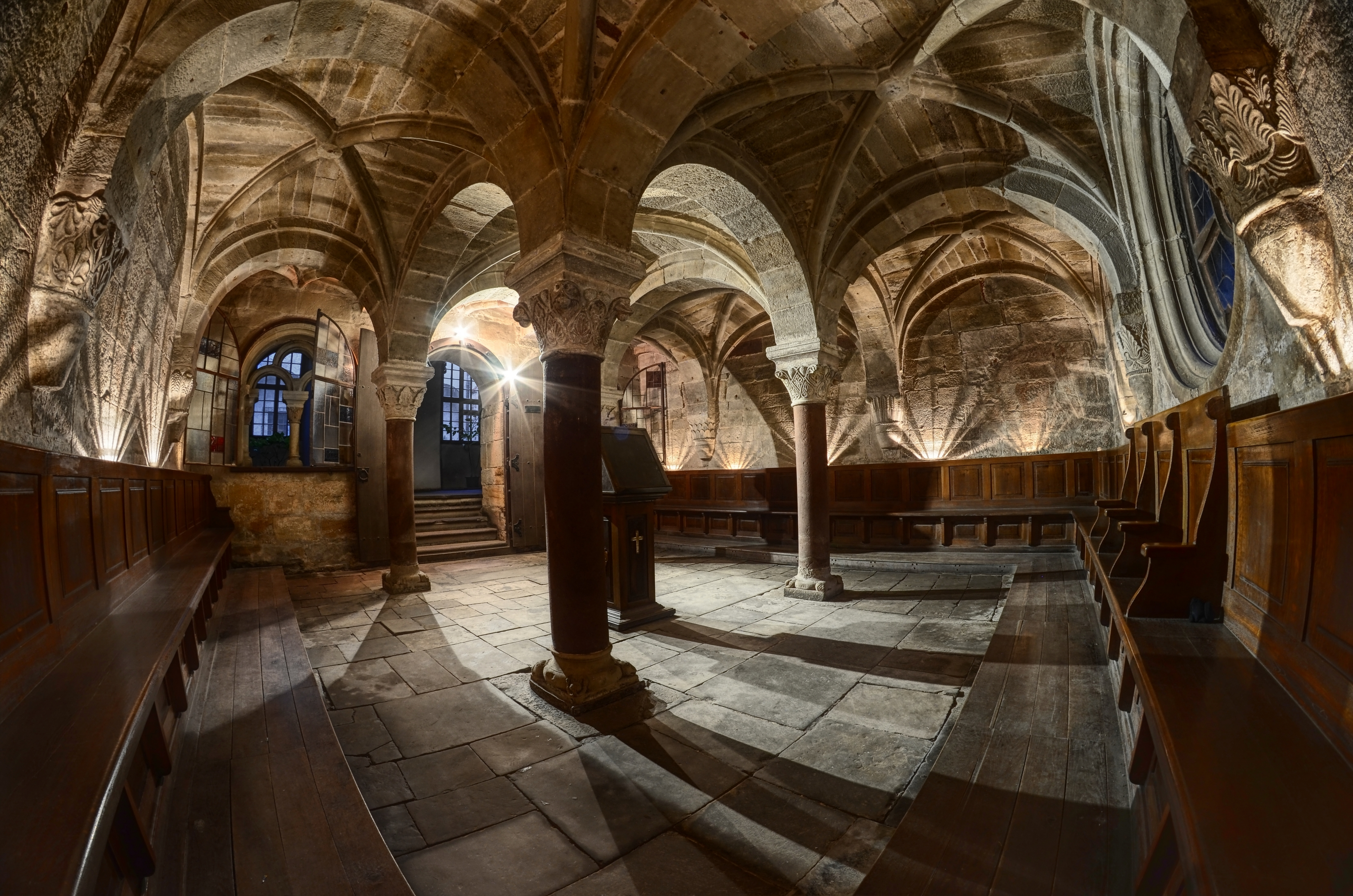
Chapter house at the Cistercian Abbey in Wąchock near Kielce
