= Kruszwica =

- Town
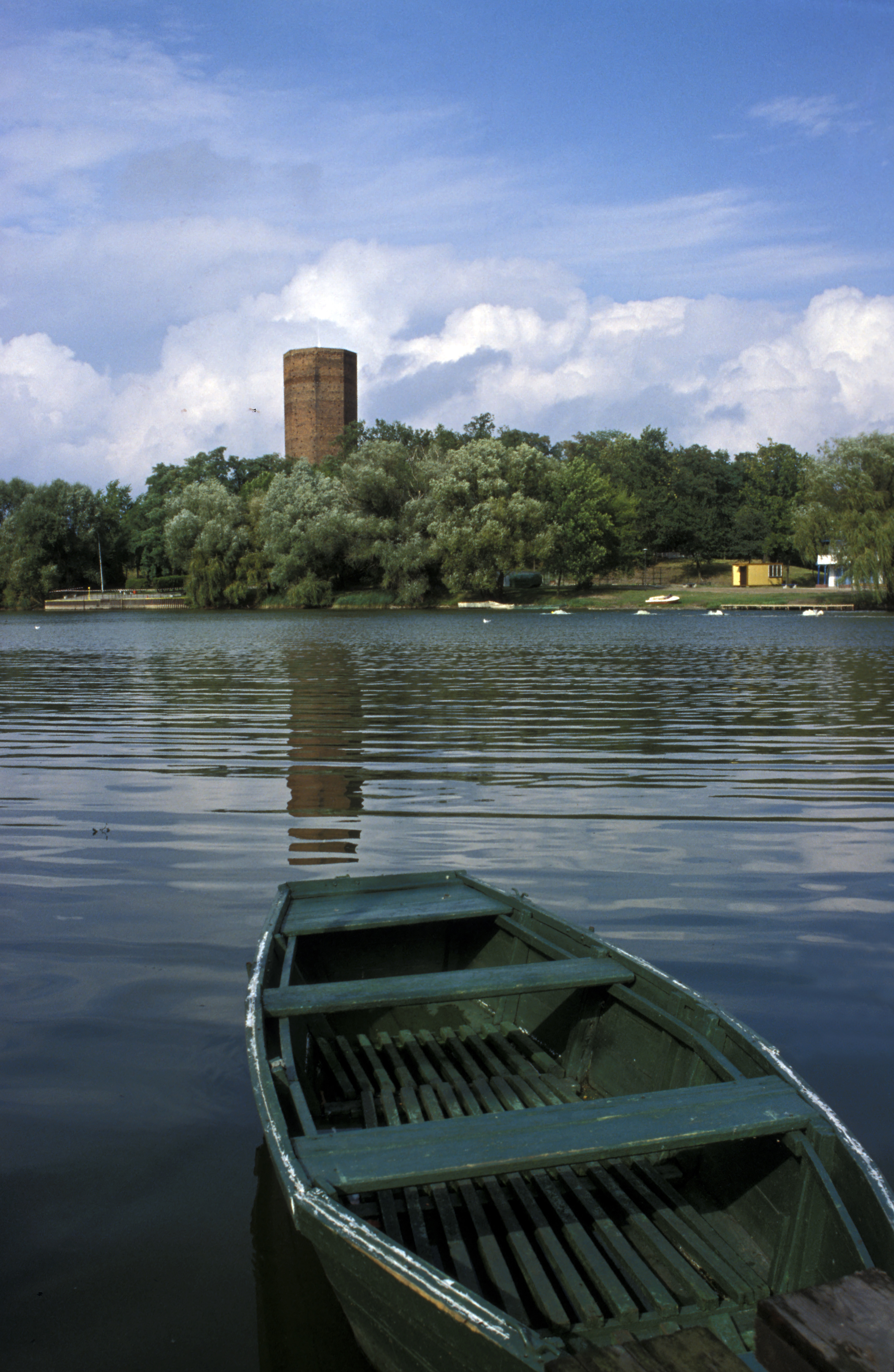
- Mysia Wieża (Mice Tower) in Kruszwica

- Flag Coat of arms

- Location within Poland
- Coordinates: 52°40′38″N 18°19′45″E
- Country: Poland
- Voivodeship: Kuyavian-Pomeranian
- County: Inowrocław
- Gmina: Kruszwica

Area
  - Total: 6.64 km^{2} (2.56 sq mi)

Population (2022)
  - Total: 9,161
  - Density: 1,380/km^{2} (3,570/sq mi)
- Time zone: UTC+1 (CET)
  - Summer (DST): UTC+2 (CEST)
- Postal code: 88-150
- Vehicle registration: CIN
- Website: http://www.kruszwica.um.gov.pl

Kruszwica ([kruʂˈfʲit͡sa]) is a town in central Poland, in the Inowrocław County in the Kuyavian-Pomeranian Voivodeship. It has a population of 9,161 (2010). Initially founded in the 6th century, Kruszwica is the oldest town in the region and features a medieval castle with a 12th-century Romanesque church. It is situated on the shores of Gopło Lake in the historic region of Kuyavia.

== History ==
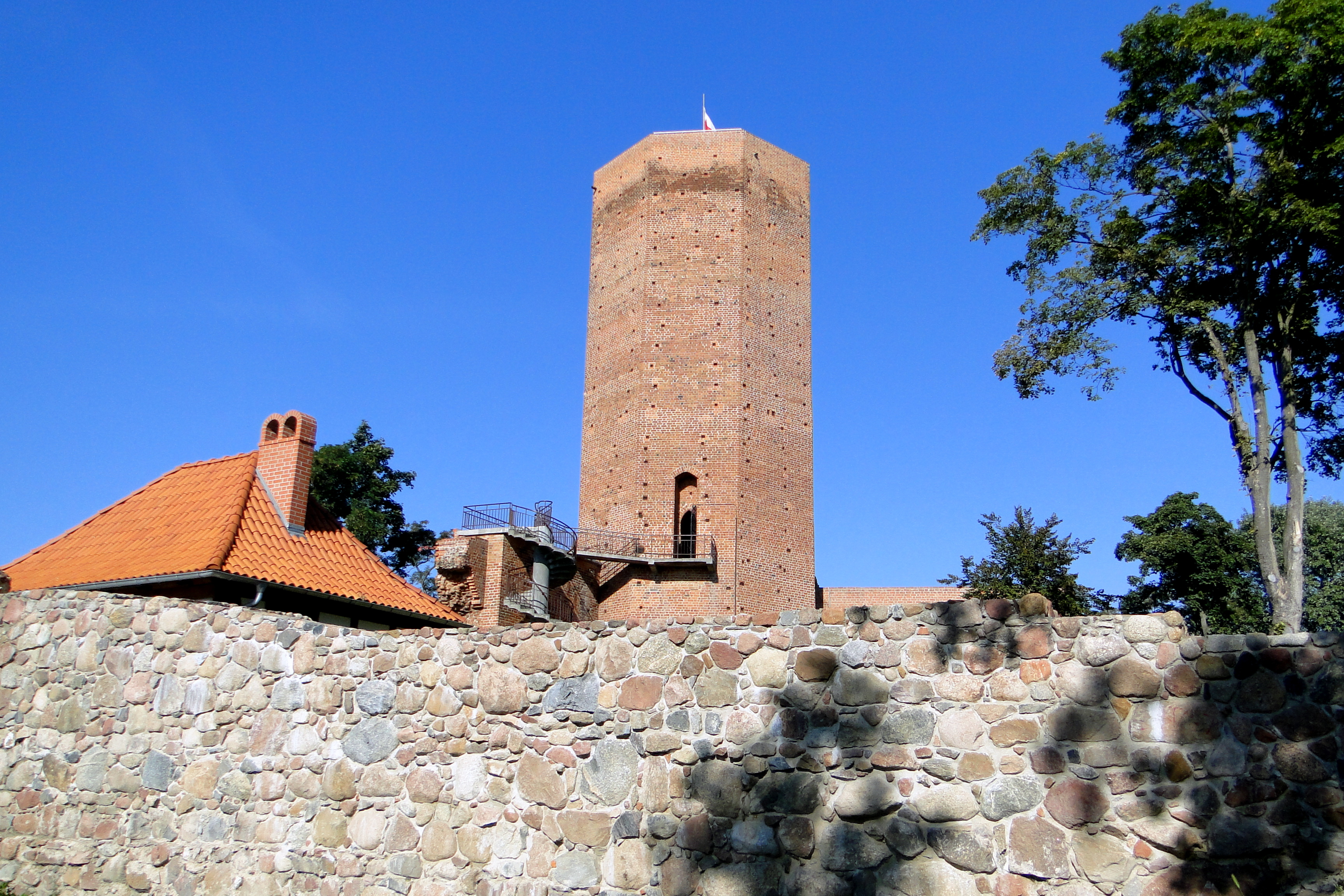
Ruins of the medieval castle

This article incorporates text from "The Political History of Poland" (1917) by Edward Henry Lewinski-Corwin, a publication now in the public domain.

Owing to the frequent raids of the Norsemen, the people of this region early organized an effective military force of defense. Under the protection of the military bands and their chiefs, the fields could safely be cultivated and the little, fortified towns (grody), which became places for the transaction of intertribal business and barter, for common worship, and for the storage of goods during a foreign invasion could be successfully defended and the wrongs of the people redressed. The military bands and their leaders soon became the unifying force, and the fortified towns, the centers of a larger political organization, with the freeman (Kmiec or Kmeton) as its base.

The first historical town of this nature was that of Kruszwica, on the Lake of Gopło. Kruszwica formed part of Poland since its establishment in the 10th century.

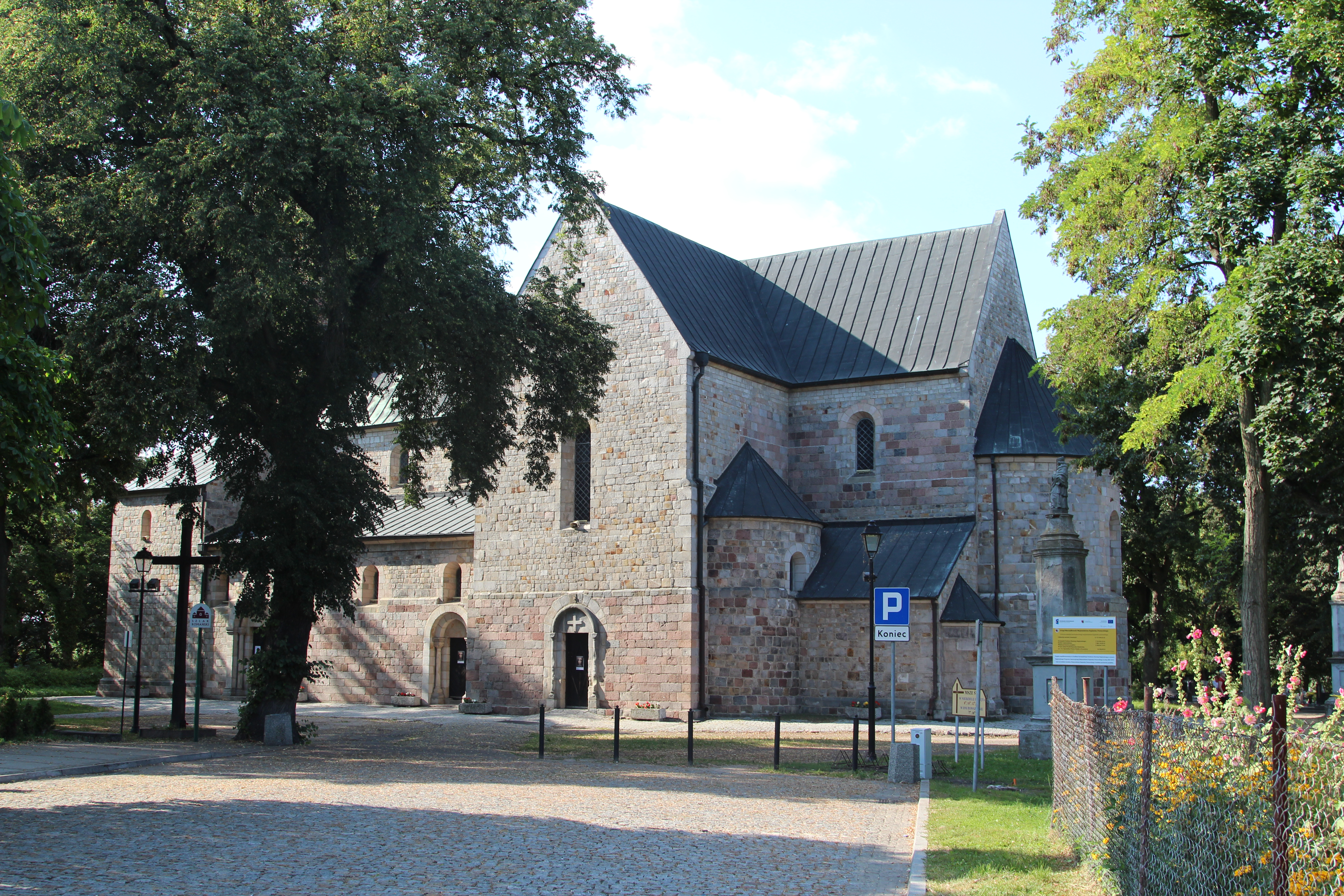

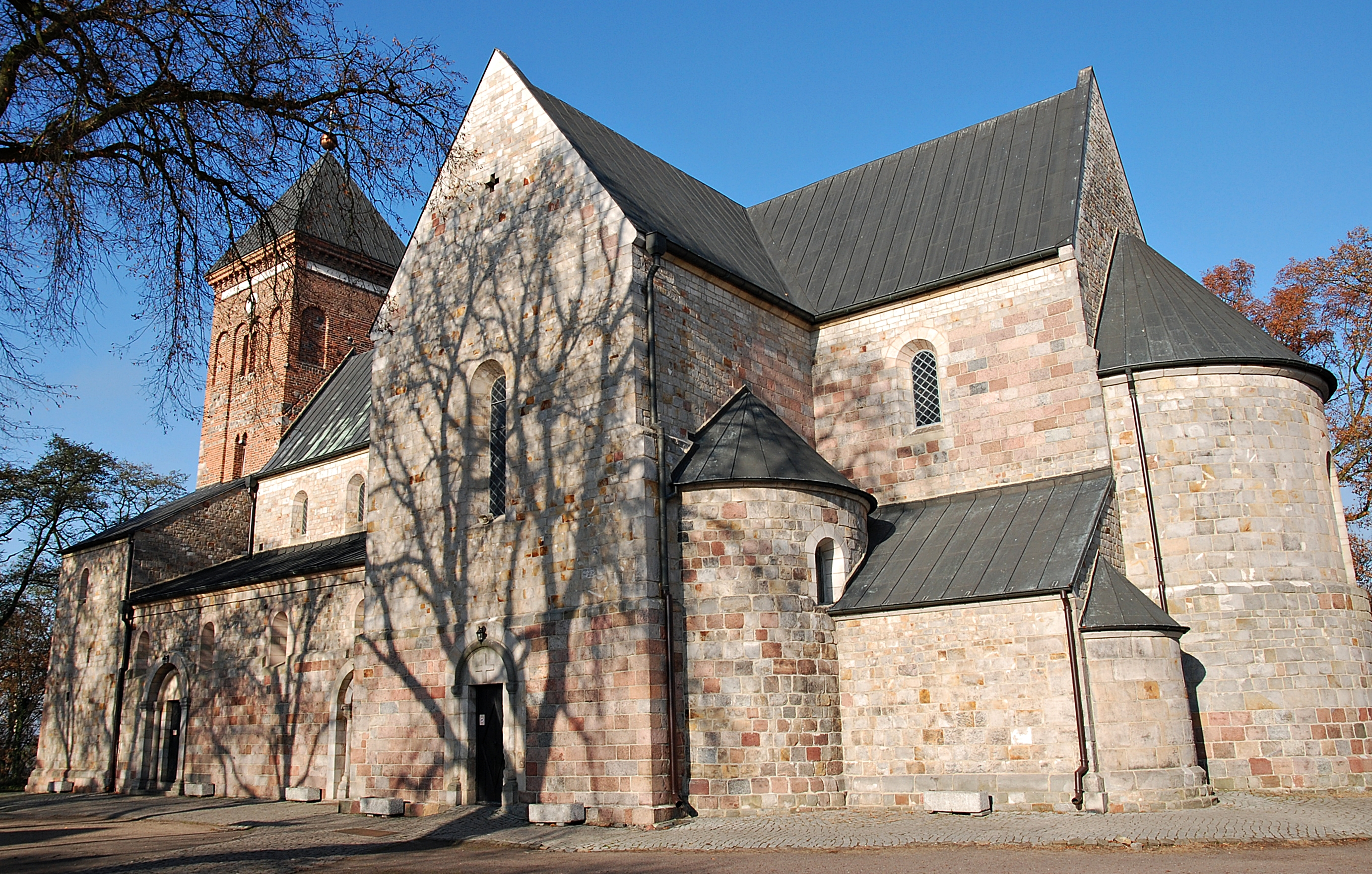
Collegiate Church of Saint Peter and Saint Paul, built in 12th century, is one of the best preserved examples of Romanesque architecture in Poland.

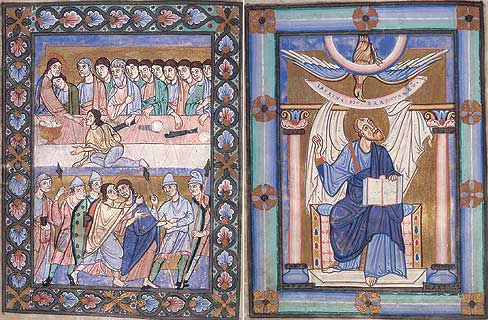
The Gospel Book of Kruszwica (ca.1160) is considered among the most precious mediaeval manuscripts in Poland.

Some historical writers attribute the change in the political organization of the primitive Polanie tribe to the influence of foreign commerce, which for geographic reasons had early centered on the Gopło. At that period the lake was a very large body of water with a level at least ten feet higher than at present. The many small lakes now existing in the region were in all probability a part of Gopło, and the valleys of the vicinity constituted the bottom of the lake. There are many reasons to believe that such was the hydrography of the section in that remote age. In his description of Gopło, written five hundred years ago, Jan Długosz, a Polish historian, speaks of a vast body of water, leading us to believe that the lake then was much larger than it is at the present time. There is reason to believe that five hundred years previous to this historian's time, before the primeval forests were cut, the lake was still larger. The supposition that Gopło at the time of its highest level was connected by means of small navigable streams with the rivers Warta, Oder and the Vistula is quite plausible.

The constructive fancy of the economic historian sees flotillas of Pomeranian merchants moving to and from Szczecin down the Oder and Noteć. Here they met merchants from the east, the southeast and the southwest of Europe. The Byzantine, Roman and Scandinavian cultures met at Kruszwica, the largest town on the banks of this vast internal sea of Poland, and exercised a revolutionary effect upon the modes of thought and the political institutions of the tribe. Otherwise the sudden transformation which took place from the tribal and communal organization of the people, which still existed in the second half of the eighth century, to the militaristic structure of society with a strong princely power, as is known to have existed in the ninth century, becomes almost unaccountable. The pressure from the west and north was, no doubt, an important element, but it alone would hardly seem sufficient to explain the change. Economic and cultural reasons had unquestionably exercised a great influence in the rapid molding of a new form of political life which was more adapted to conditions that had arisen since the change from nomadic pursuits to settled agriculture.

Kruszwica was a county seat and royal town of the Kingdom of Poland, administratively located in the Brześć Kujawski Voivodeship in the Greater Poland Province.

Following the joint German-Soviet invasion of Poland, which started World War II in September 1939, Kruszwica was occupied by Germany until 1945. From 1940 to 1942, the German administration operated a forced labour camp for Jewish women in the town, and afterwards from 1942 to 1943 a forced labour camp for Jewish men. The Polish resistance movement was active in Kruszwica. Władysław Kostuj, who organized the local branch of the Secret Teaching Organization, was arrested in 1944 and murdered by the German gendarmerie.

From 1975 to 1998, it was administratively located in the Bydgoszcz Voivodeship.

== Demographics ==
Historical population

Year	Pop.	±%
1910	3,245	—
1921	3,021	−6.9%
1931	3,515	+16.4%
1939	5,313	+51.2%
1950	5,090	−4.2%

Year	Pop.	±%
1960	6,344	+24.6%
1975	6,778	+6.8%
1980	7,614	+12.3%
2010	9,211	+21.0%

== Tourism ==
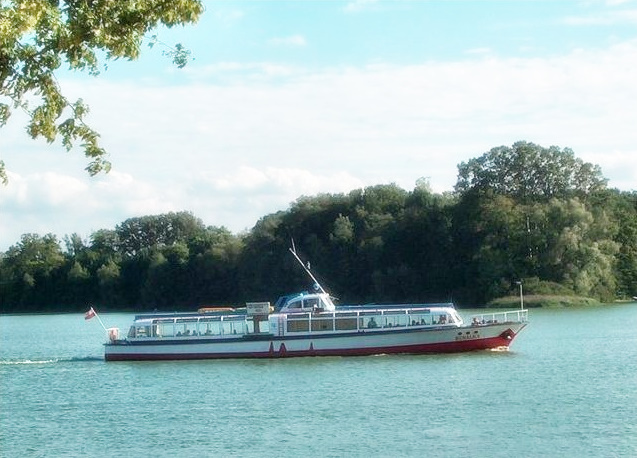
"Rusalka" pleasure boat

Kruszwica has a great opportunity for development in tourism. There is a hotel with restaurant, 'Zajazd u Piasta Kołodzieja', located by the Mice Tower and the lake Gopło. There are also summer houses and campsites in the town. In the neighboring village of Kobylniki, there is a French-style palace serving as a hotel.

The town is well prepared to accommodate tourists, including foreigners, who are increasingly numerous. The city is well-developed with regard to cuisine. In Kruszwica, there are boat trips on the lake, yacht, canoe and pedal boat rentals, horse stud and carriage rides around the area, beaches and bathing areas, lake viewing terraces and other attractions.

Rowing championships for the European and Polish cup, as well as several smaller categories, are organized every year in Kruszwica.

== Major corporations ==
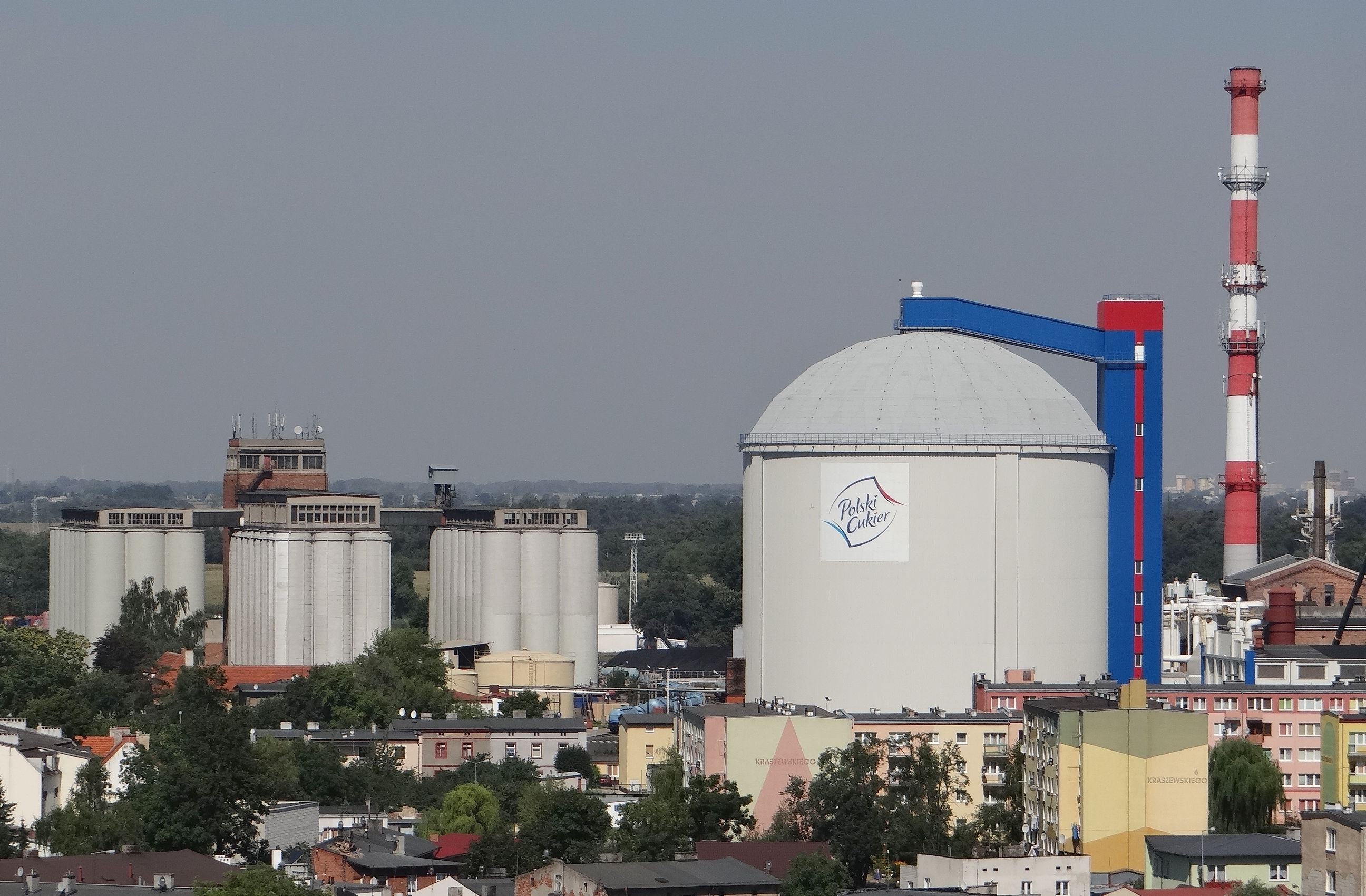
Kruszwica sugar plant

- Zakłady Tłuszczowe Kruszwica SA, manufacturing Kujawski Oil and Tina Margarine
- Kruszwica Sugar Works

== Transport ==
Kruszwica lies on national road 62.

The nearest railway station is in Inowrocław.

== Notable residents ==
- Gustav Höhne (1893–1951), general
- Jakub Krzewina (born 1989), sprinter
- Sebastian Urbaniak (born 2001), Polish hurdler
