= St. Nicholas Church, Wysocice =

Church in Wysocice, Poland

Coordinates: 50.2841°N 19.9214°E

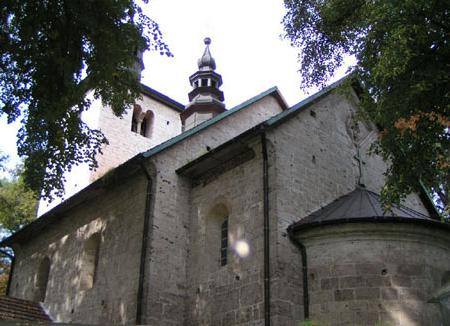
St. Nicholas Church in Wysocice

St. Nicholas Church in Wysocice was founded in the end of 12th century by Iwo Odrowąż relative of St. Jacek Odrowąż. The building has survived until today in an unchanged state without any renovation.
