= Abbey Church, Czerwińsk nad Wisłą =

The Basilica of the Annunciation of the Blessed Virgin Mary
- Bazylika Zwiastowania Najświętszej Marii Panny
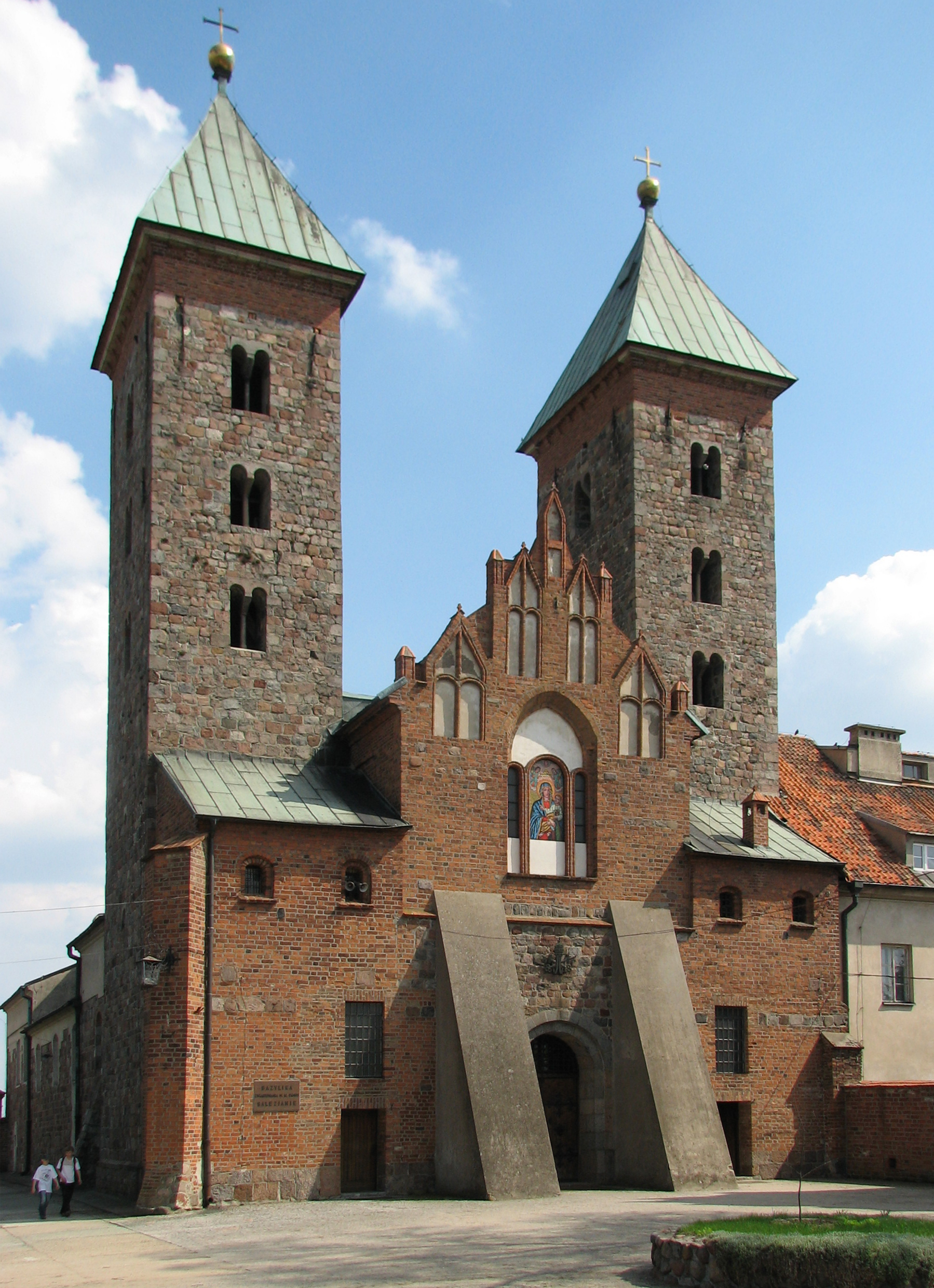
- Romanesque façade

- 52°23′43.9″N 20°18′33.5″E
- Location: Czerwińsk nad Wisłą
- Country: Poland
- Denomination: Catholic

History
- Status: Minor basilica
- Dedication: Annunciation

Architecture
- Functional status: Active
- Style: Romanesque
- Years built: 12th century

Administration
- Archdiocese: Warsaw
- Diocese: Płock
- Deanery: Wyszogród

Historic Monument of Poland
- Designated: 19 April 2021
- Reference no.

The Basilica of the Annunciation of the Blessed Virgin Mary (Polish: Bazylika Zwiastowania Najświętszej Marii Panny), informally known as the Abbey church in Czerwińsk nad Wisłą, Sanctuary of Our Lady of Consolation is a Roman Catholic historical church built in the 12th century.

Despite Gothic and Baroque elements added in later centuries, the basilica remains one of the most valuable examples of Romanesque architecture in Poland, and as such it is listed as a Historic Monument of Poland.

The church was built of granite blocks from locally available boulders, left by the retreating ice sheets of the Pleistocene glaciations. The heterogeneous colouring of the stone, ranging from dark gray through various shades of grey, ochre and pink to red, is considered to enhance the aesthetic value of the building.

Pope Paul VI issued a Pontifical decree titled Propugnaculum Fidei Artisque which raised the shrine to the status of Minor Basilica on 10 July 1967. An image of Our Lady of Consolation is enshrined within, sometimes called as its localized Salus Populi Romani. The image was granted a Pontifical decree of coronation titled Didicimus in Templum on 2 February 1969, signed and notarized by the former Dean of the College of Cardinals, Luigi Traglia. The rite of canonical coronation was executed on 6 September 1970.

== Gallery ==
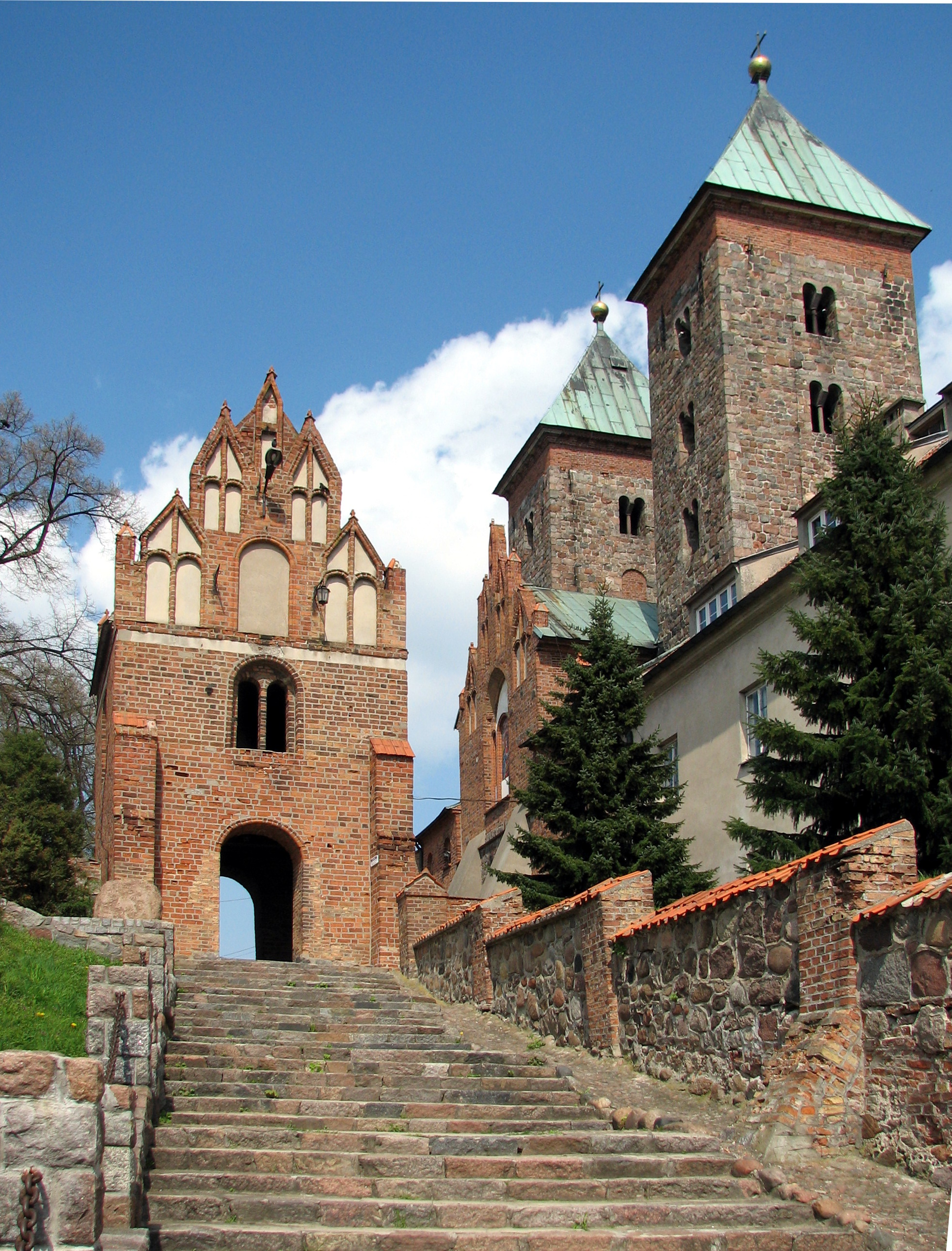
Stairs, monastery gate, and church towers on the right

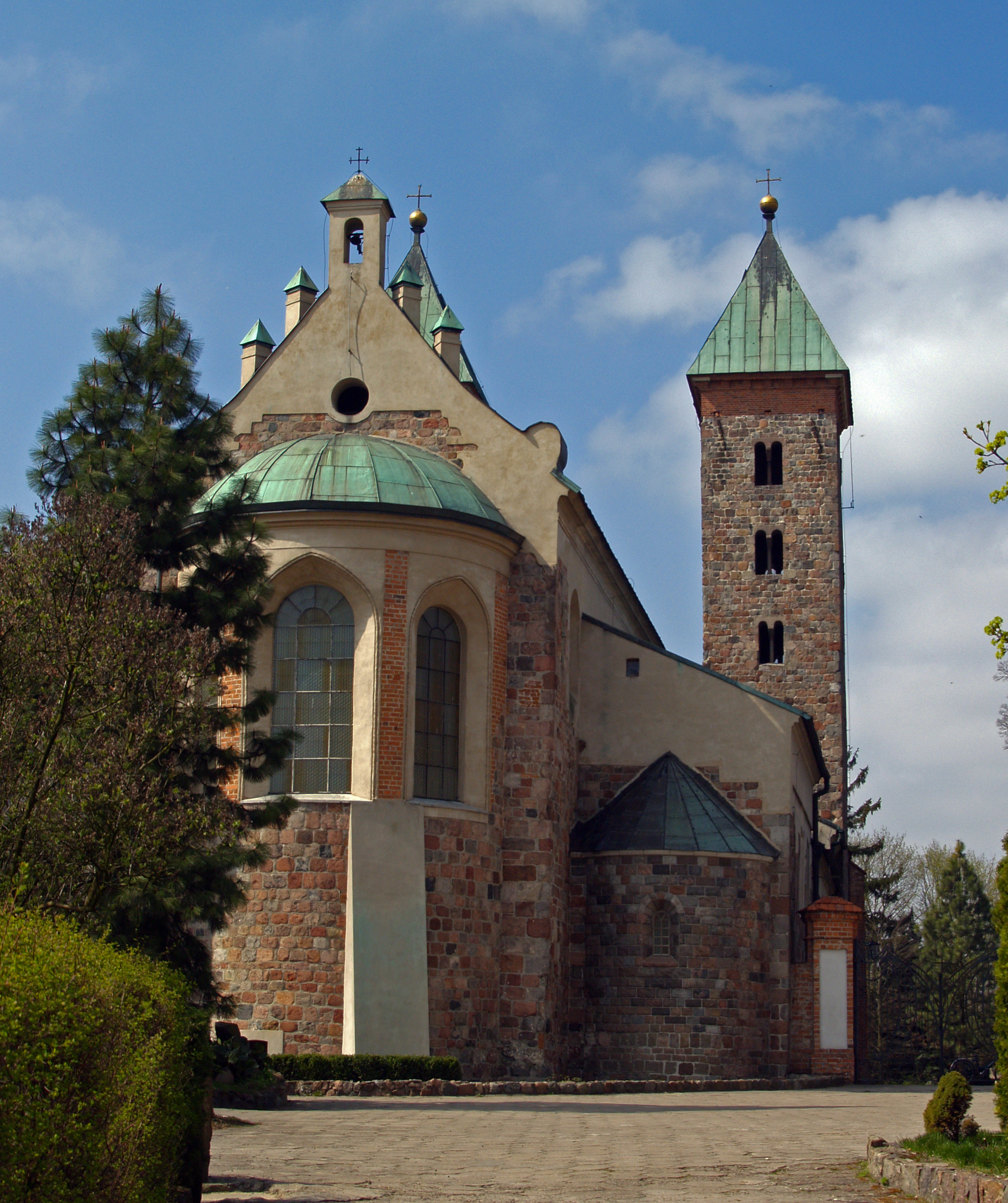
Rear view

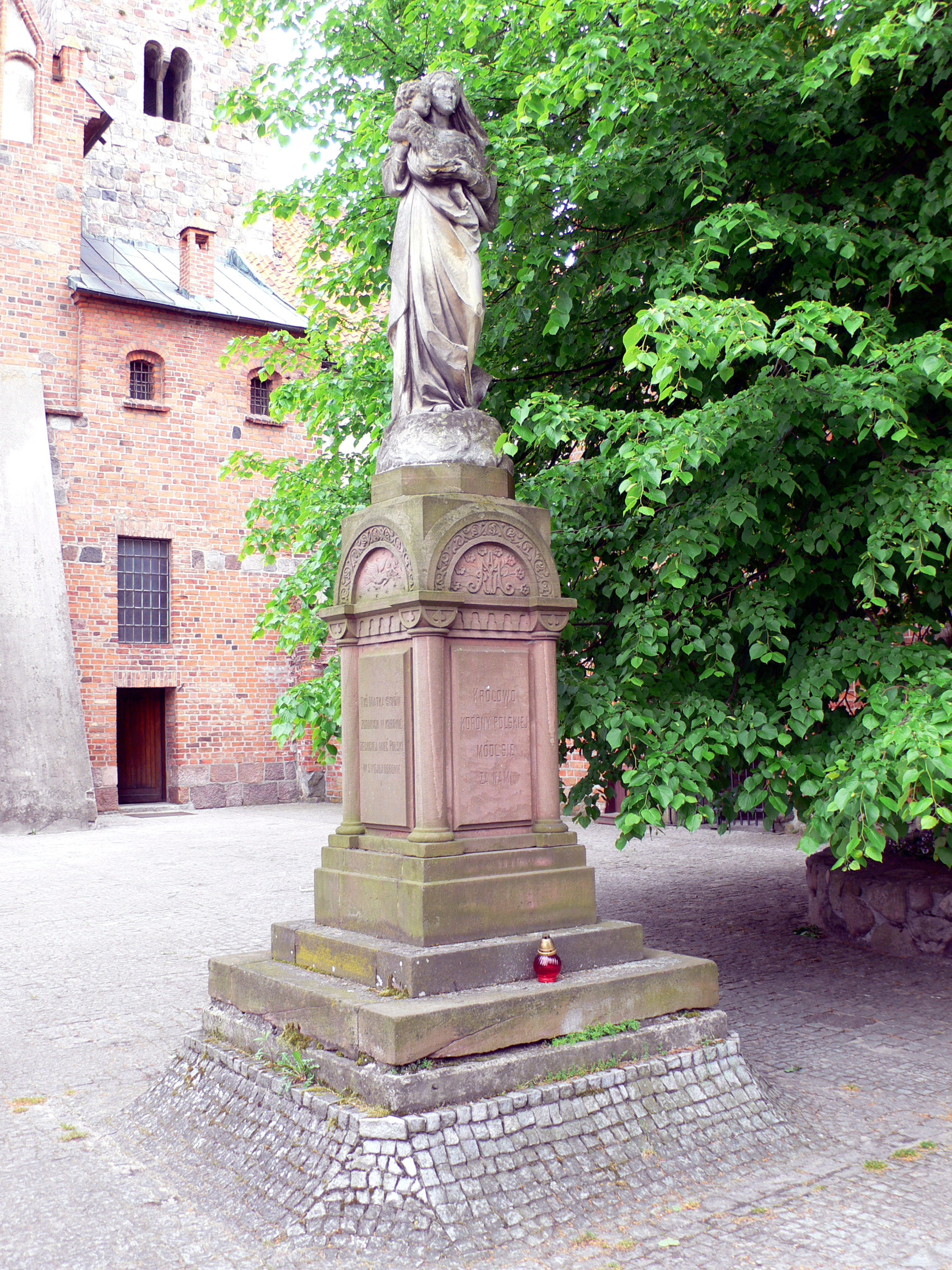
Marian statue in the garden

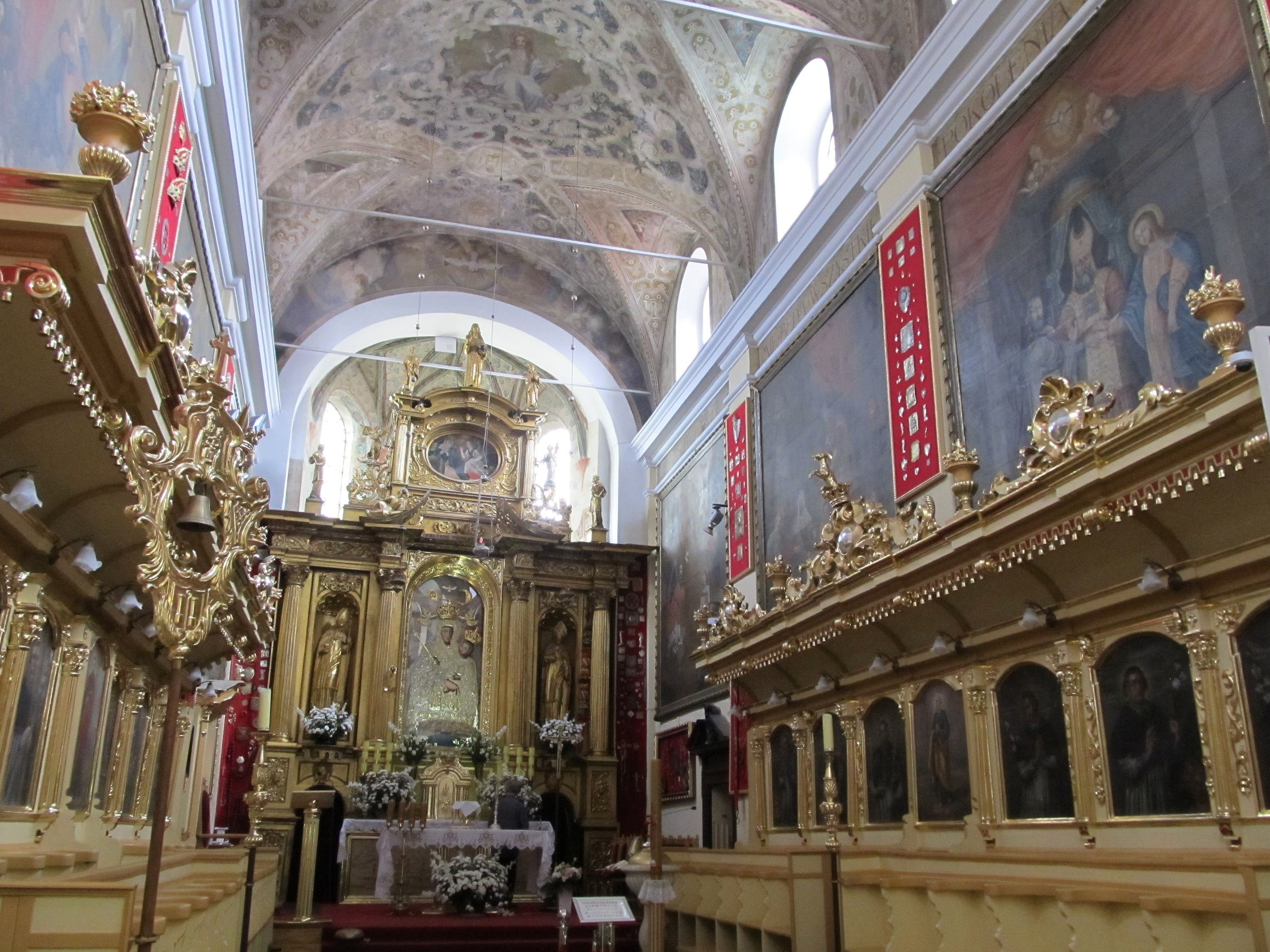
Church interior

== See also ==
· · · ·
- Catholic Church in Poland
