= Sts. Peter and Paul Collegiate Basilica =

Romanesque Catholic church in Poland

Coordinates: 52°40′48″N 18°19′38″E

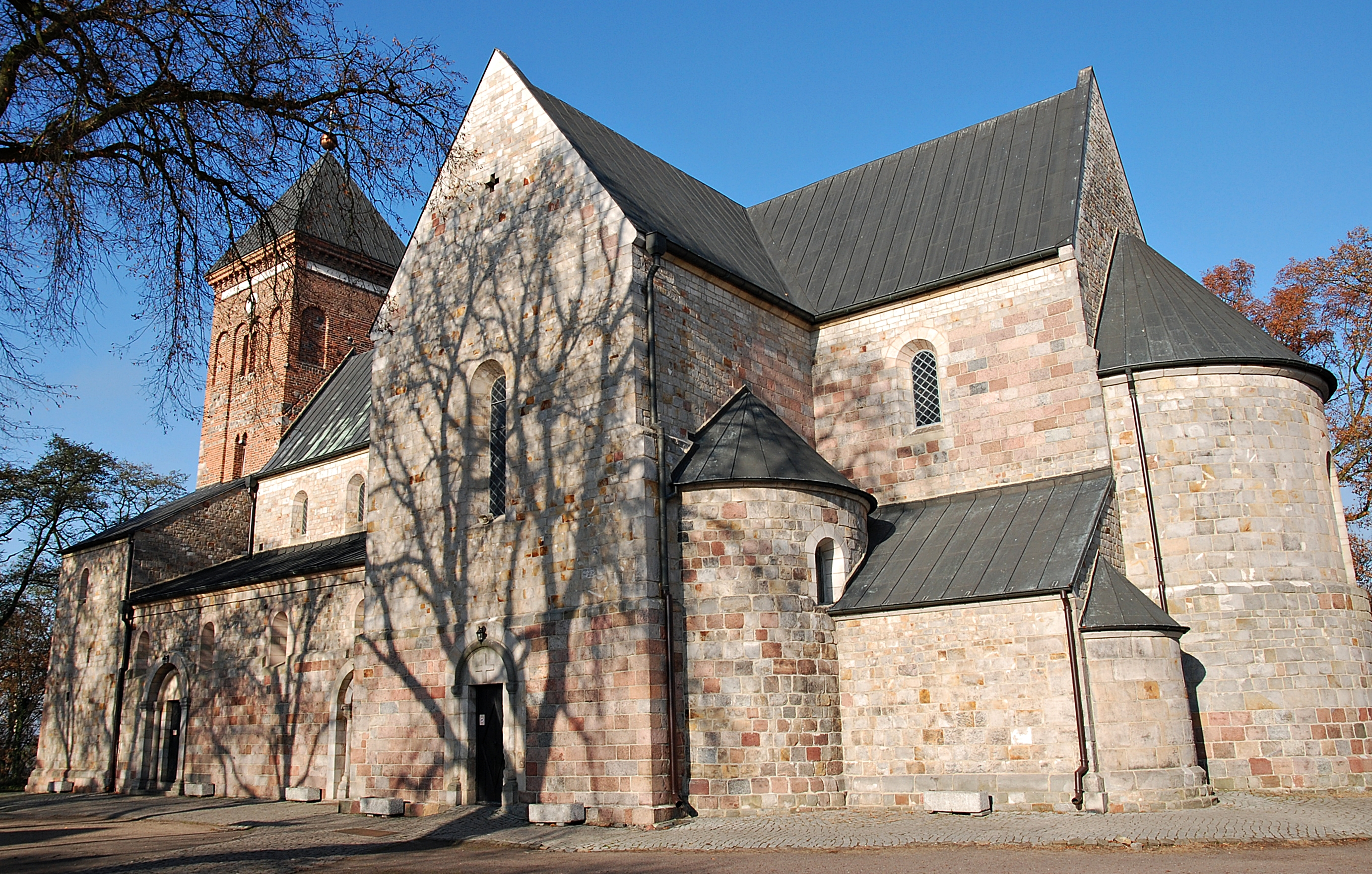
Collegiate church, Kruszwica (2009)

Sts. Peter and Paul Collegiate Basilica is a granite and sandstone romanesque Roman Catholic church in Kruszwica, Poland, with transept, presbytery and apse founded in 1120.

It was intentionally located away from the city to encourage monastic life. It remains "one of the most important Romanesque monuments in Poland, because it has retained almost intact spatial layout and shape, with the exception of the Gothic tower which replaced the two side, Romanesque ones."

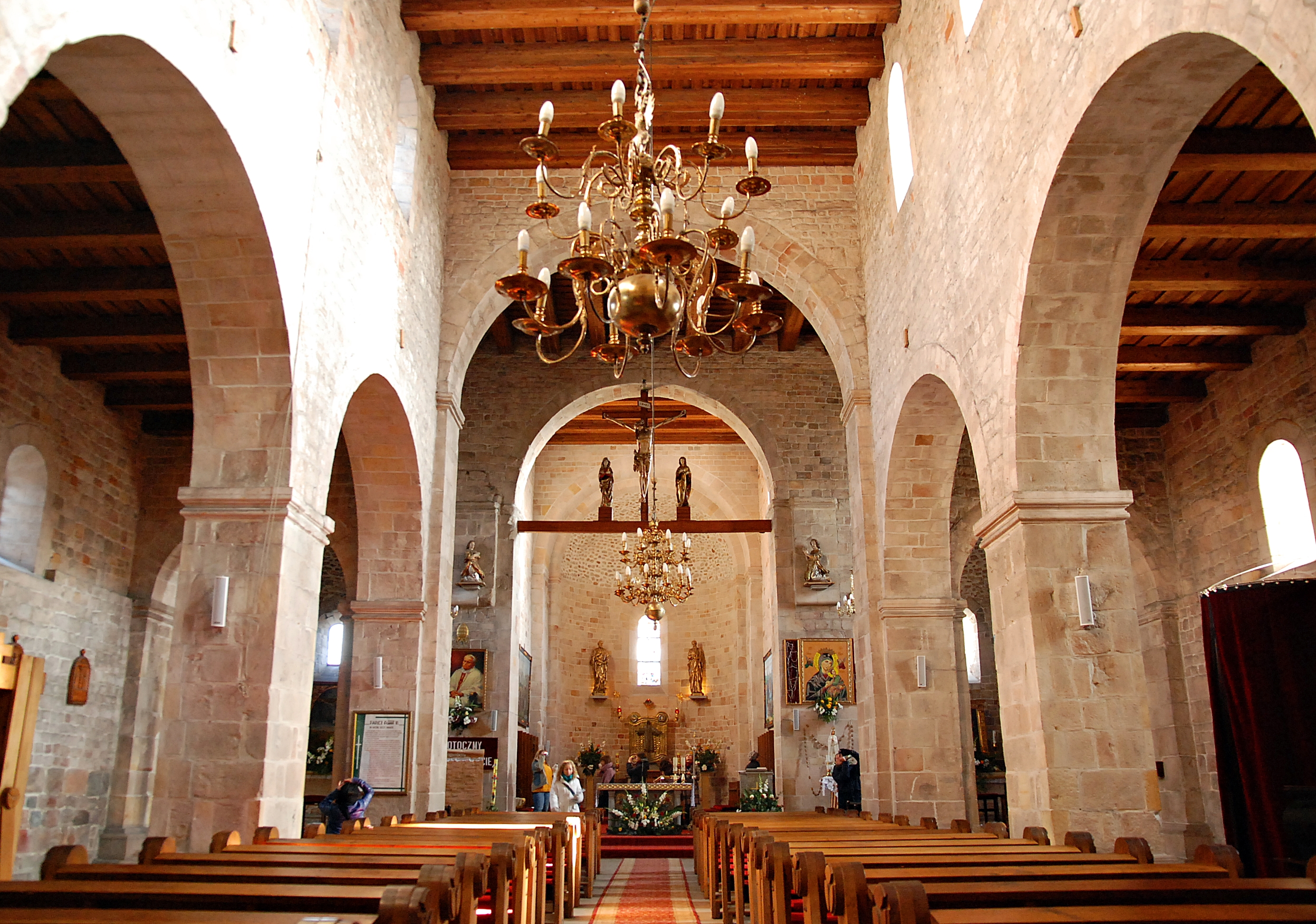
Interior of the Collegiate church, Kruszwica (2009)

== See also ==
- Architecture of Poland
- Catholic Church in Poland
- Lists of churches
