= Wysocice =

- Village
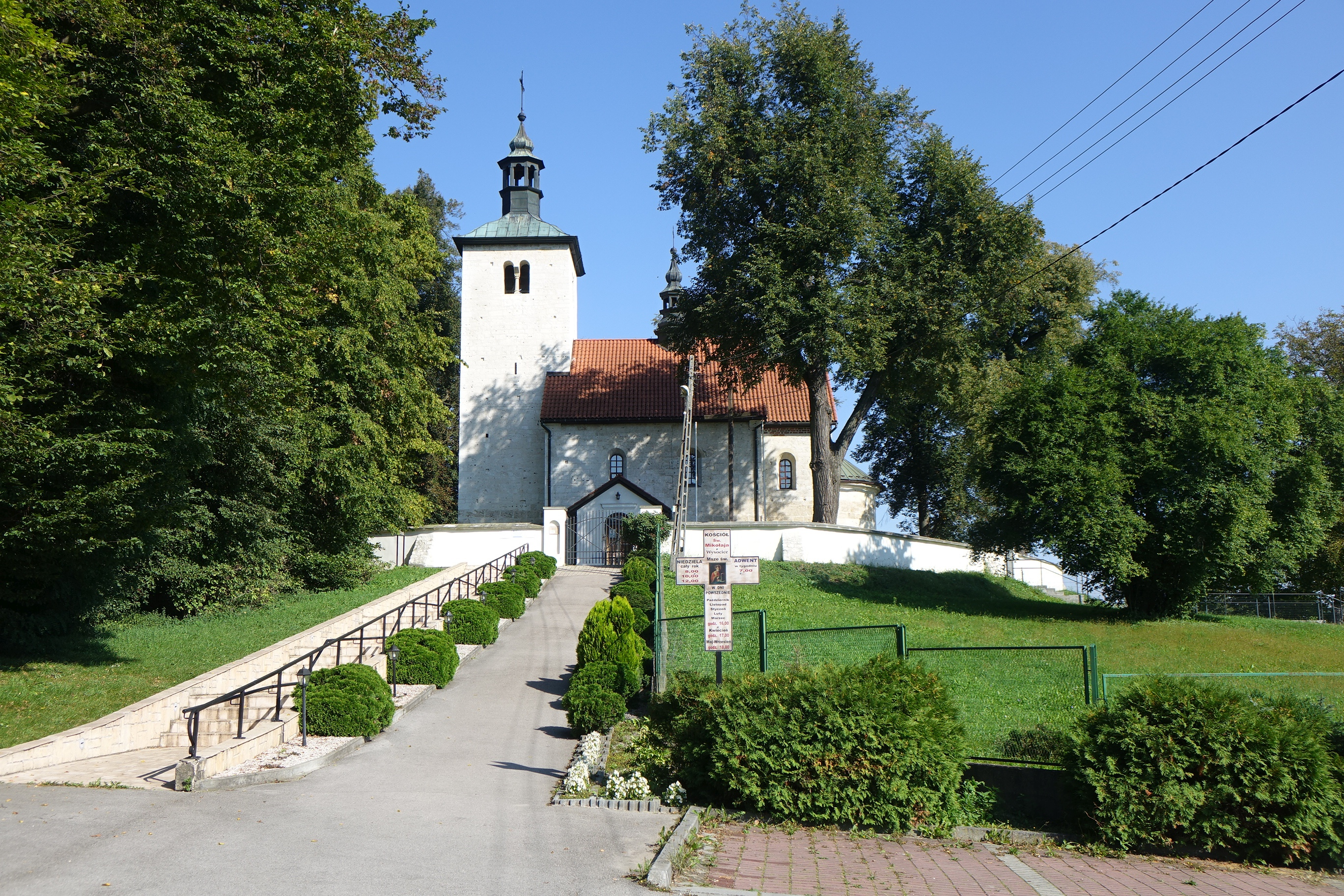
- Catholic church

- Location within Poland
- Coordinates: 50°17′2″N 19°55′17″E
- Country: Poland
- Voivodeship: Lesser Poland
- County: Miechów
- Gmina: Gołcza
- Population: 437

Wysocice [vɨsɔˈt͡ɕit͡sɛ] is a village in the administrative district of Gmina Gołcza, within Miechów County, Lesser Poland Voivodeship, in southern Poland.
