= Gothic architecture in modern Poland =

Polish Gothic architecture

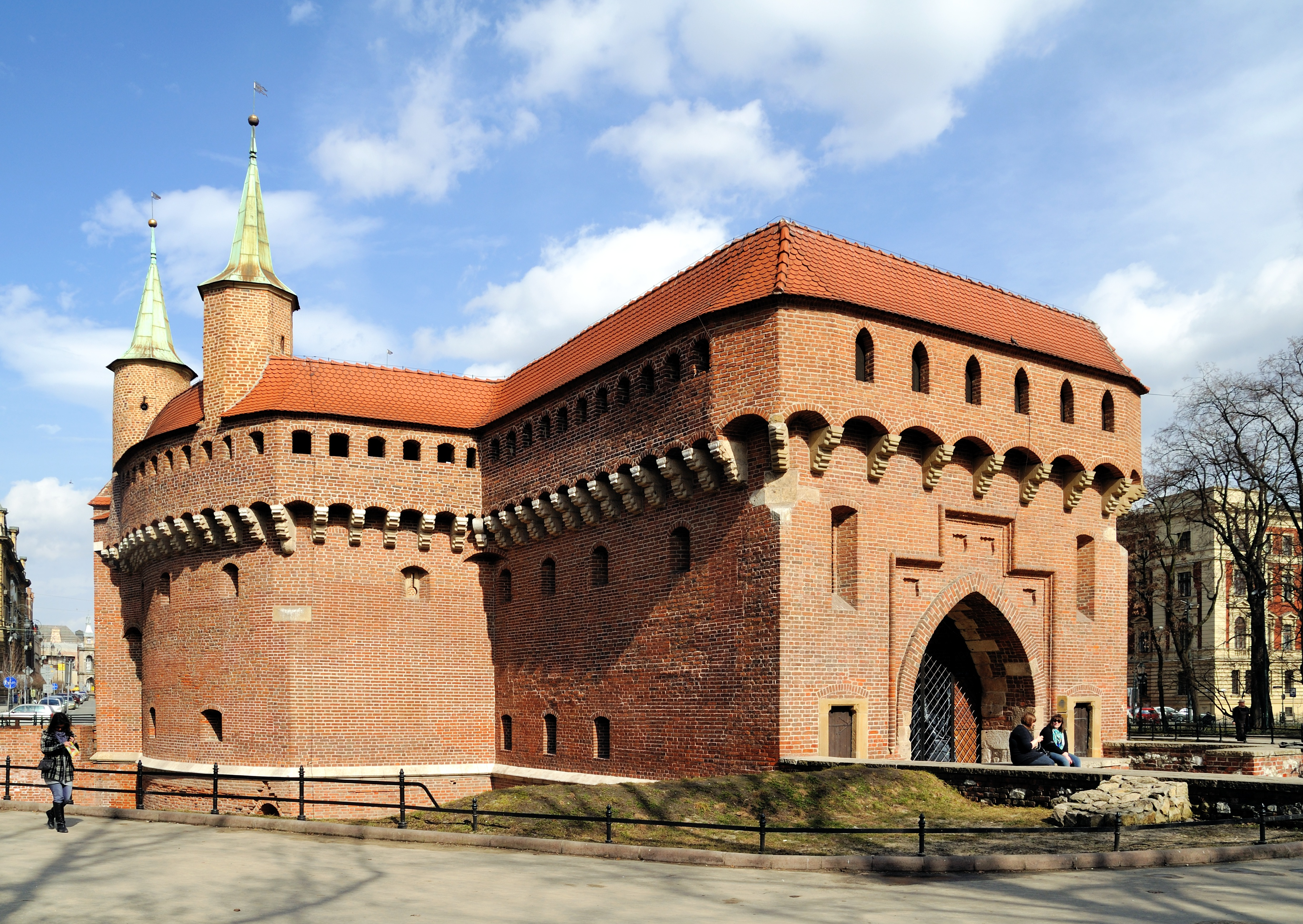
Kraków Barbican

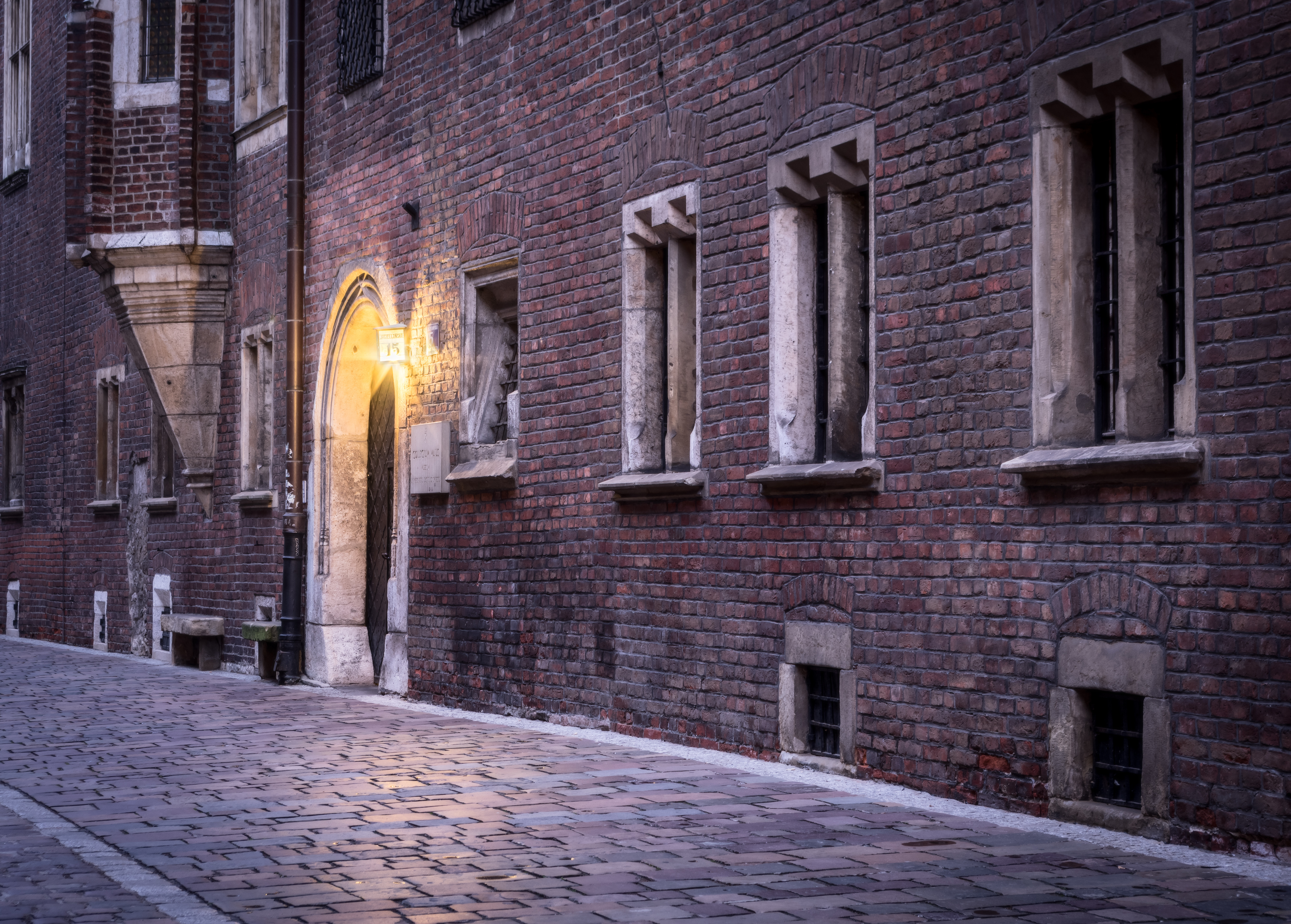
Collegium Maius of Jagiellonian University in Kraków

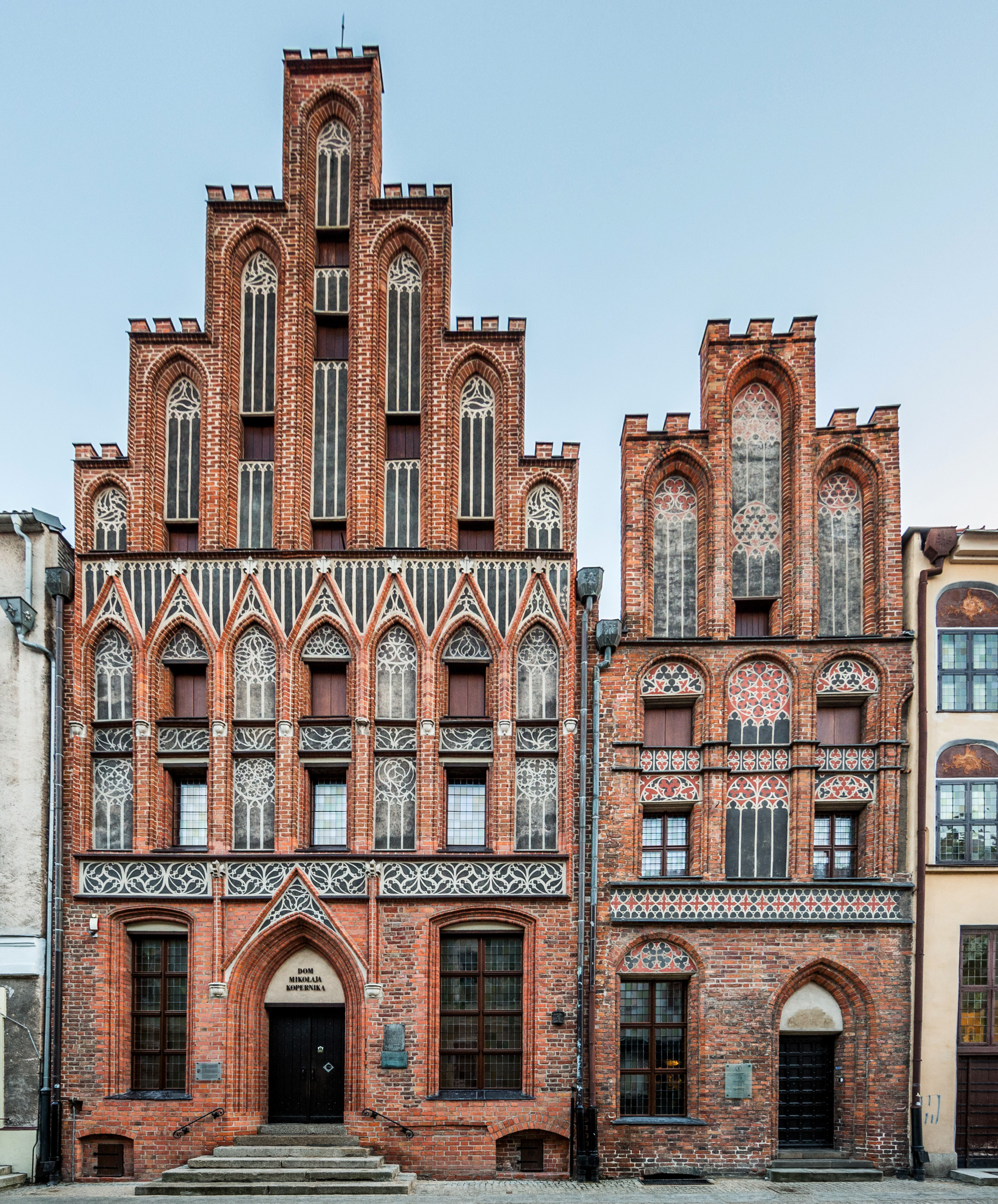
Nicolaus Copernicus house in Toruń

The Gothic architecture arrived in Poland in the first half of the 13th century with the arrival of the Dominican and Franciscan orders. The first elements of the new style are evident in the foundation of the Dominican Trinity church in Kraków (1226–1250), built by Bishop Iwo Odrowąż. Rebuilding of the Wrocław Cathedral, started in 1244, was another early manifestation of the Gothic style. The earliest building in Poland built entirely in the Gothic style is the chapel of St. Hedwig in Trzebnica (1268–1269), on the grounds of a Cistercian monastery.

Gothic architecture was preceded by the Romanesque style, and some Romanesque buildings still survive, mostly in the north and west of the country (see here). Most Gothic buildings in Poland are made of brick, and belong to the Baltic Brick Gothic, especially in northern Poland (see Significant Brick Gothic buildings in Poland). Nonetheless, not all Gothic buildings in Poland are made of brick. Many buildings, e.g. the Wawel Cathedral in Kraków are mostly stone-built. Poland also has some Gothic fieldstone churches, mostly of relatively small size. The centres of Polish Gothic are Kraków, Gdańsk, Toruń and Wrocław.

The reign of king Casimir the Great was the time of the greatest flowering of gothic architecture in Poland. A similar development took place in the late Gothic phase, during the reign of Casimir the Jagiellonian.

In the region of Lesser Poland (in the south) buildings were built of brick with stone blocks used for some details. Churches built in the area are often two-nave, there are also some basilicas with relatively short aisles. Silesian Gothic resembles solution found in Lesser Poland, with some influence from Bohemia. As in Lesser Poland, Silesian Gothic buildings were mostly made of brick, with stone being used for details. One of the characteristics is the location of the tower – at the intersection of the transept of the church choir, on the south-east. The architecture of the northern Poland was strongly influenced by the Teutonic Order state buildings and Hansa cities. Churches in Pomerania were largely made of brick and were built as hall churches with tall towers, while basilicas were much less common. No new local form of the Gothic style developed in Mazovia, and Mazovian architecture dominated by simplified forms of Gothic styles found elsewhere.

== Castles ==
Beginning in the 13th century, royal and ducal castles were being modernized, expanding functionality of existing buildings (Wawel Castle, Legnica Castle). Construction of new castle began. As this initially required consent of the ruler, the oldest castles were state-built. Initially, in the 13th century, the characteristic elements of the locks were placed in a role within the wood-earth castles, so the first castles were irregular in shape (e.g., in Opole). After the mid-13th century abandoned the construction palatiów to be connected rather with the earlier epoch. Regular shape of castles spread throughout the Polish Kingdom in the reign of Casimir the Great, and built them into this shape, even in areas of previous castles (Rawa, Łęczyca, Koło). Castles and monasteries built by Joannites (Stare Drawsko, Łagów, Swobnica, Pęzino) and the Teutonic Order, in the state created by them in Prussia (Malbork, Radzyń Chełmiński, Niedzica) and bishops (in Lipowiec). The castles were built or final defense towers (known as stołp) and residential towers (donżon).

The best preserved Gothic castles are:

- in Lesser Poland: Chęciny, Odrzykoń, Czorsztyn, Niedzica, Kazimierz Dolny, Bobolice, Będzin, Lipowiec, Ogrodzieniec and others on Trail of the Eagles' Nests
- in northern Poland: built by the Teutonic Order in Malbork, Nidzica, Golub, Radzyń Chełmiński, Gniew; or on their strongholds modeled (usually built on the estates of bishops) in Kwidzyn, Lidzbark Warmiński, Olsztyn, Reszel.
- in Mazovia: Castle in Ciechanów, Czersk, Liw.
- in Greater Poland: Castle in the Koło, Szamotuły, Gołańcz, Łęczyca.
- in Lower Silesia: Siedlęcin Tower, Bolków, Chojnik, Żmigród, Świny
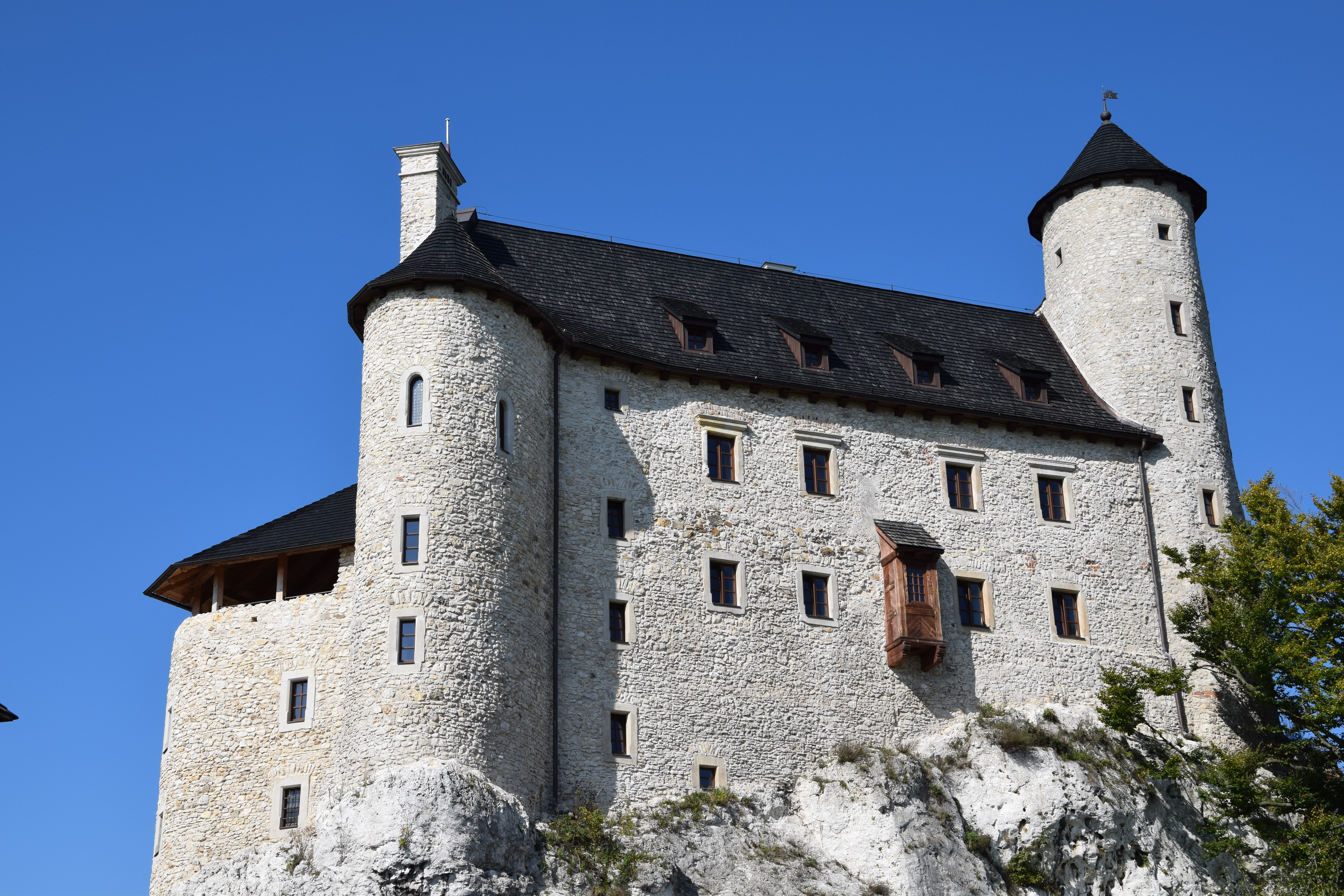
Bobolice Castle

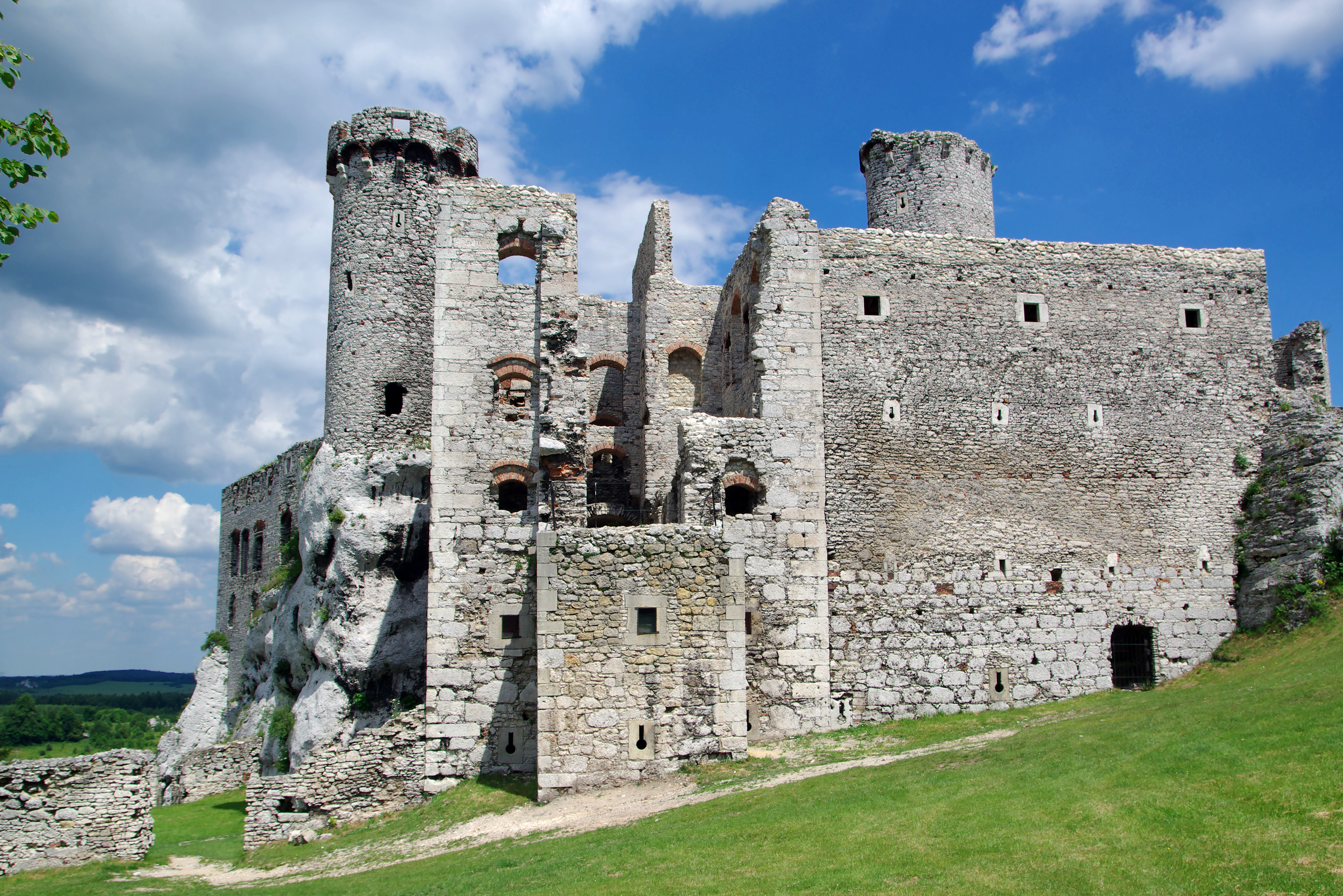
Ogrodzieniec Castle (partially rebuilt)

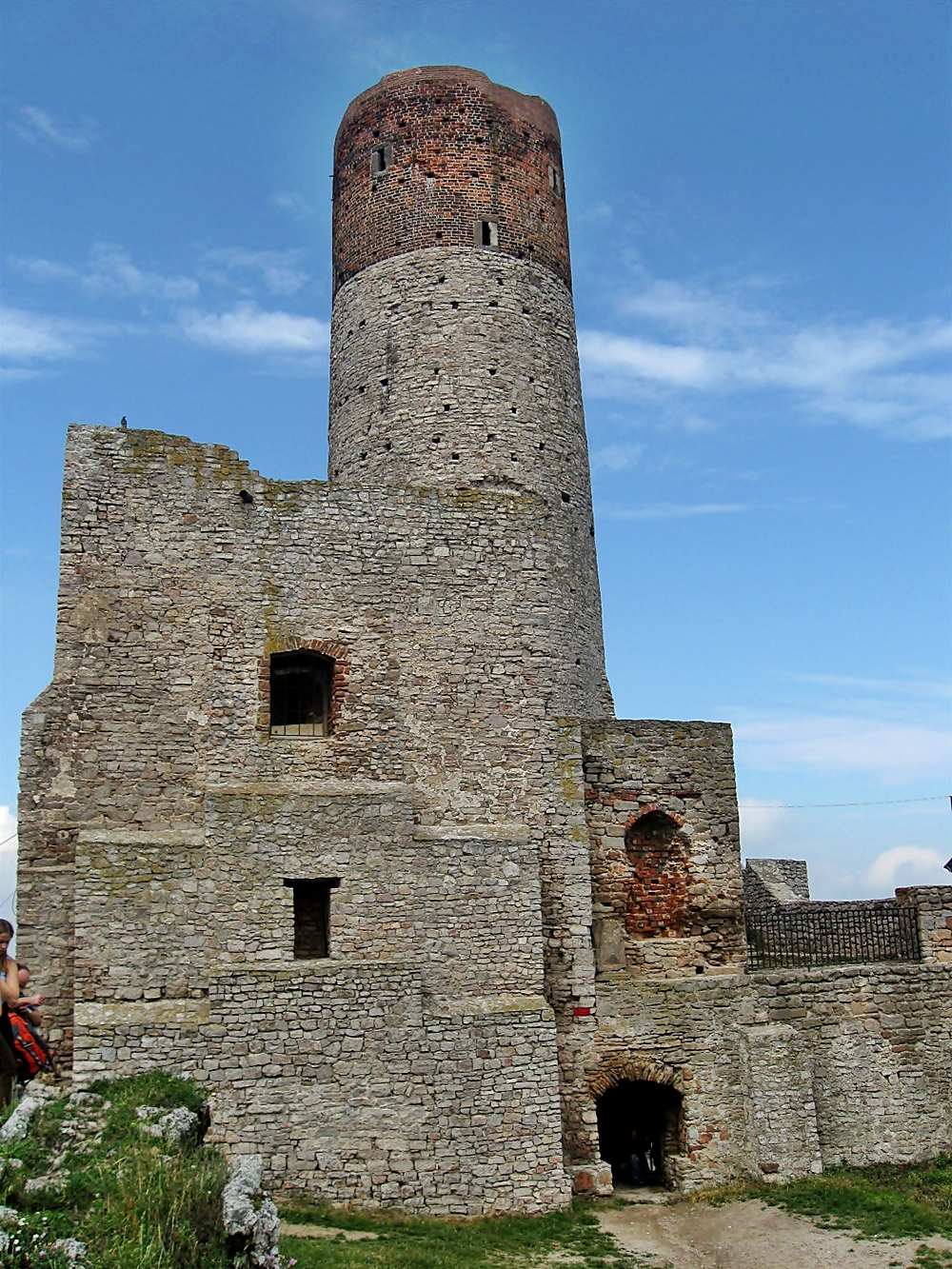
Castle in Chęciny

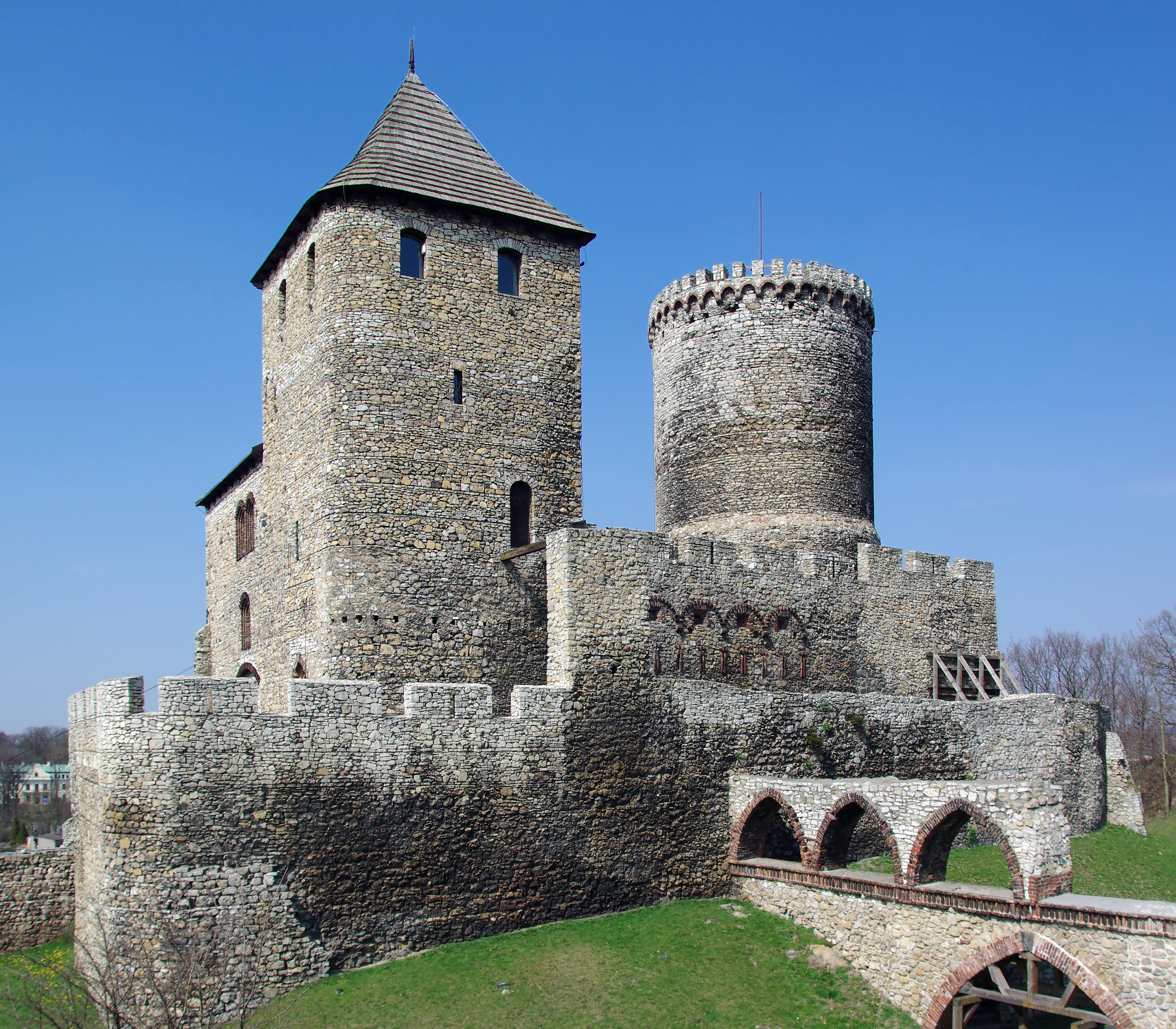
Będzin Castle

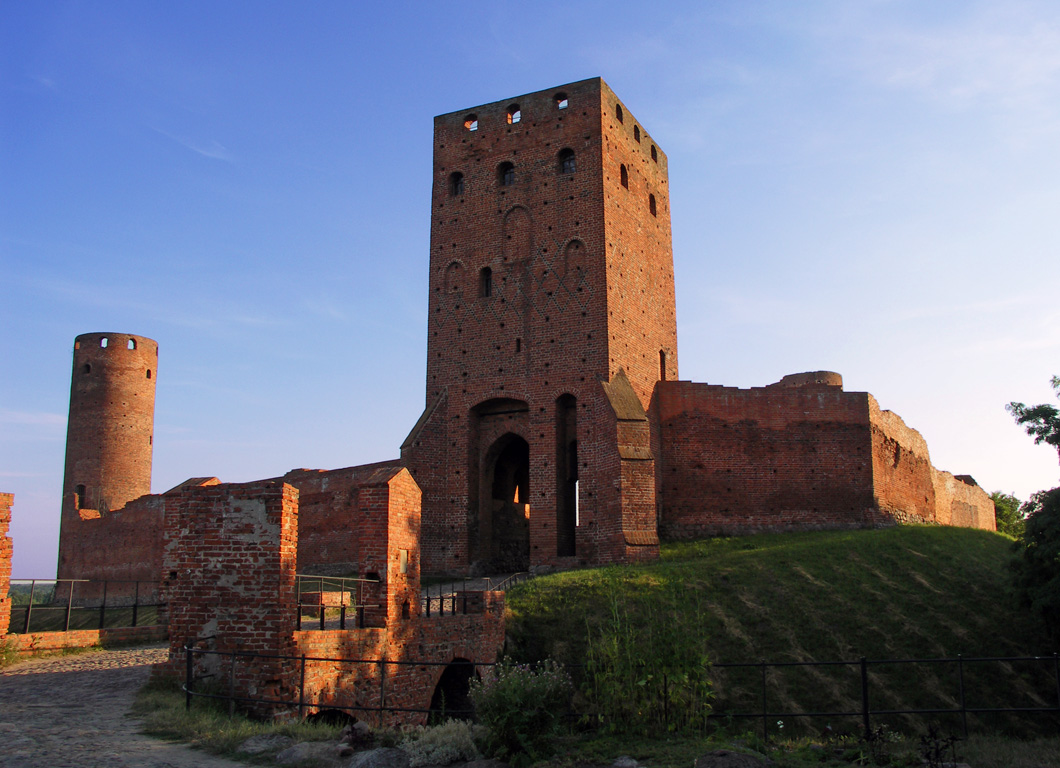
Masovian Dukes Castle in Czersk

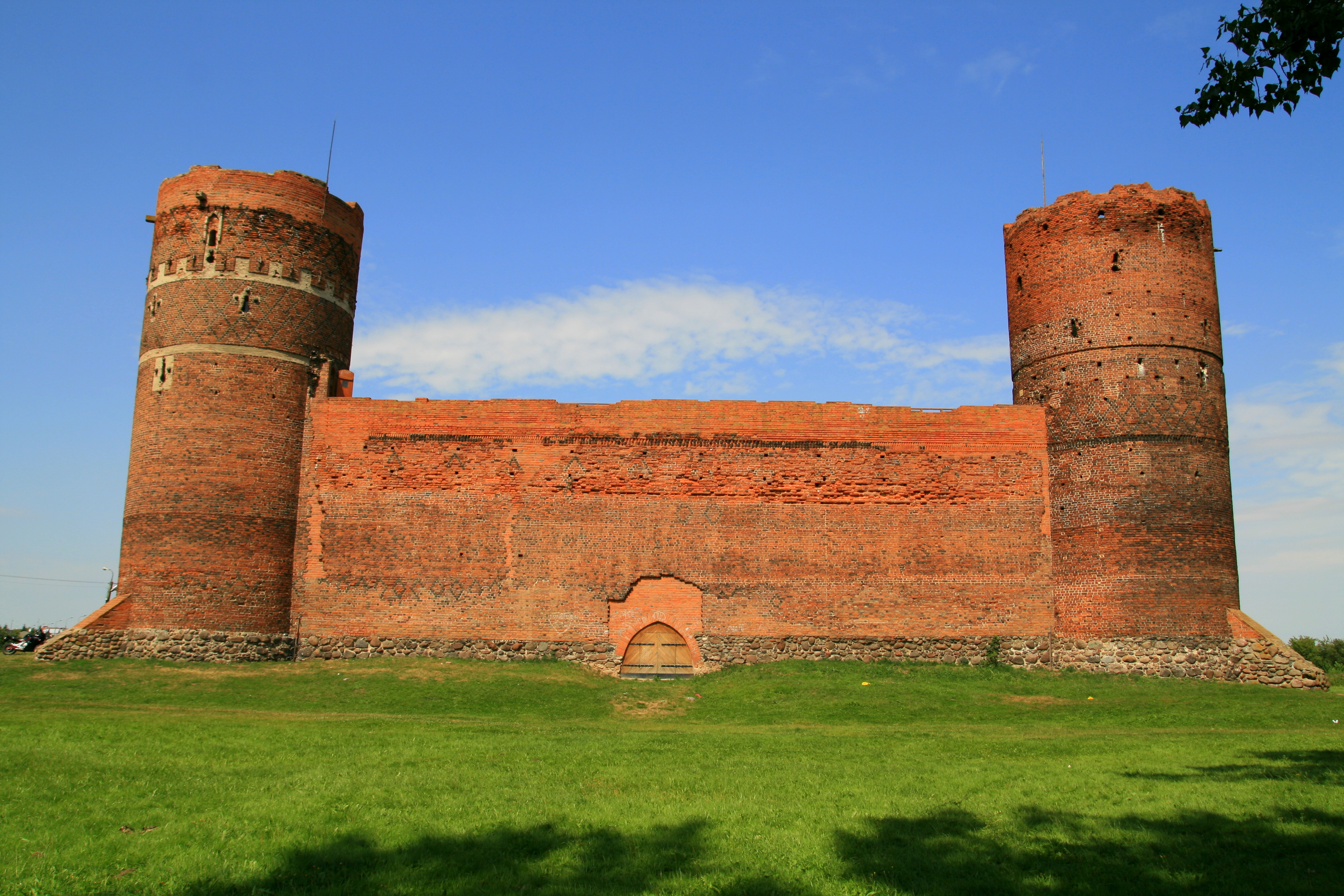
Masovian Dukes Castle in Ciechanów

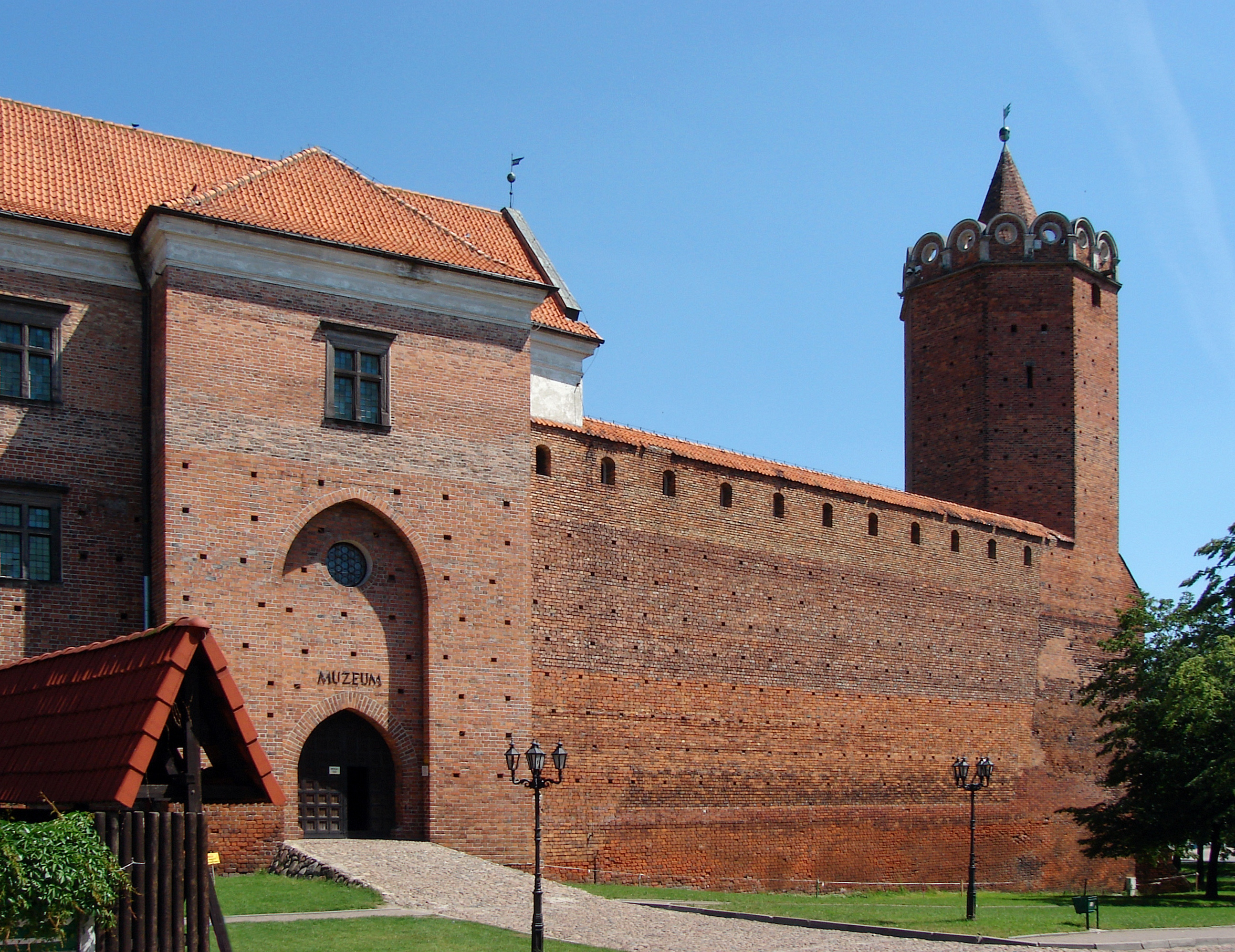
Royal Castle in Łęczyca

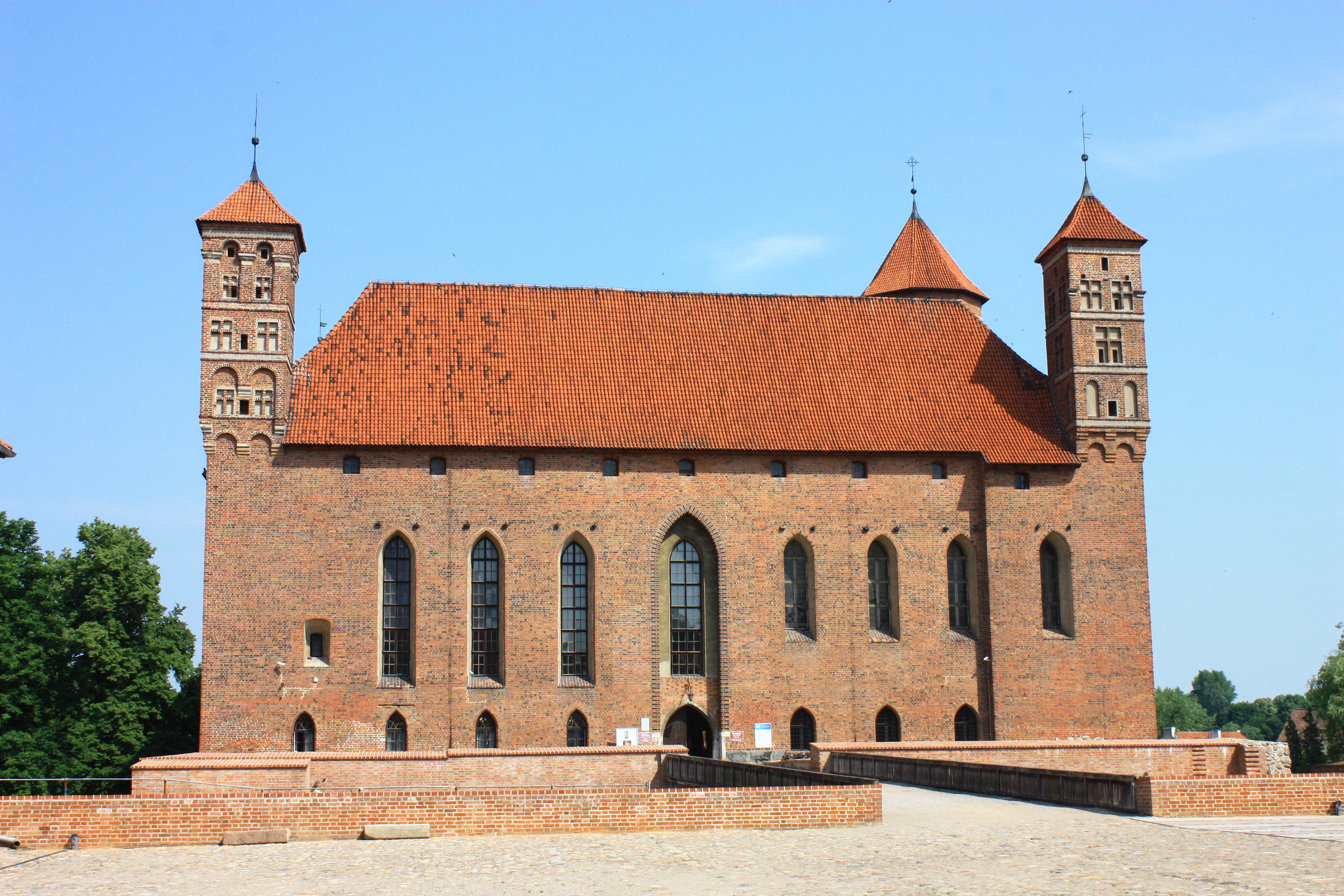
Castle of Warmian Bishops in Lidzbark Warmiński

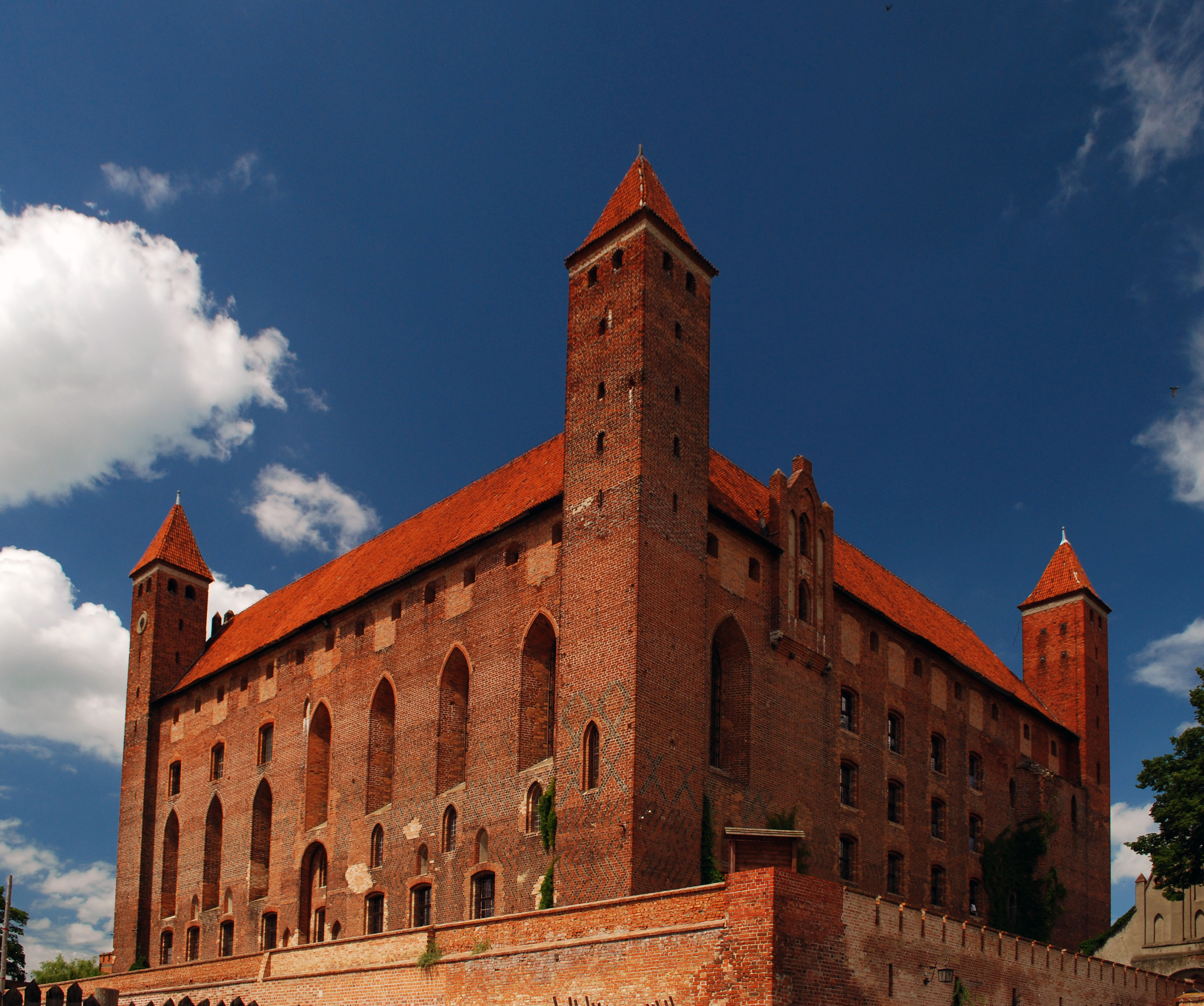
Teutonic Castle in Gniew

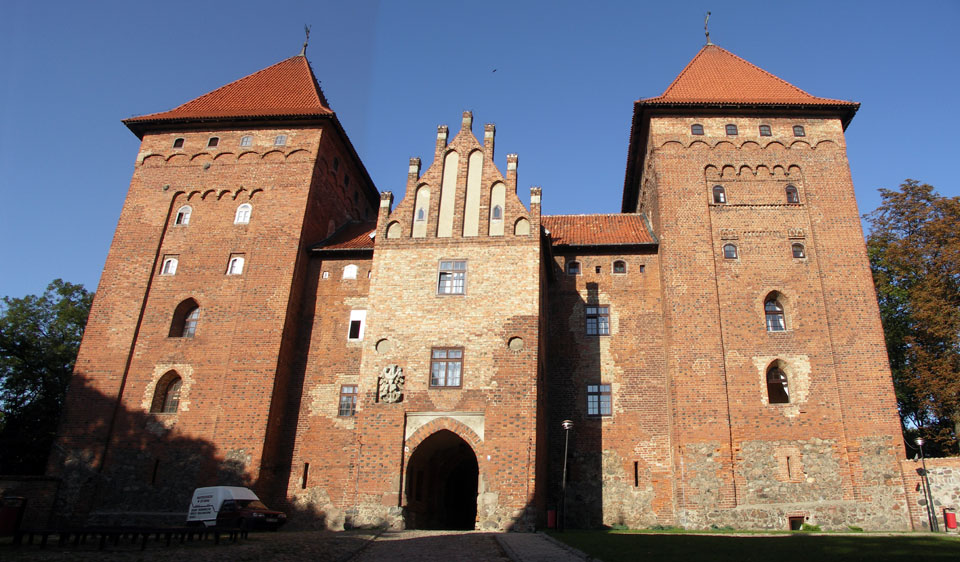
Teutonic Castle in Nidzica

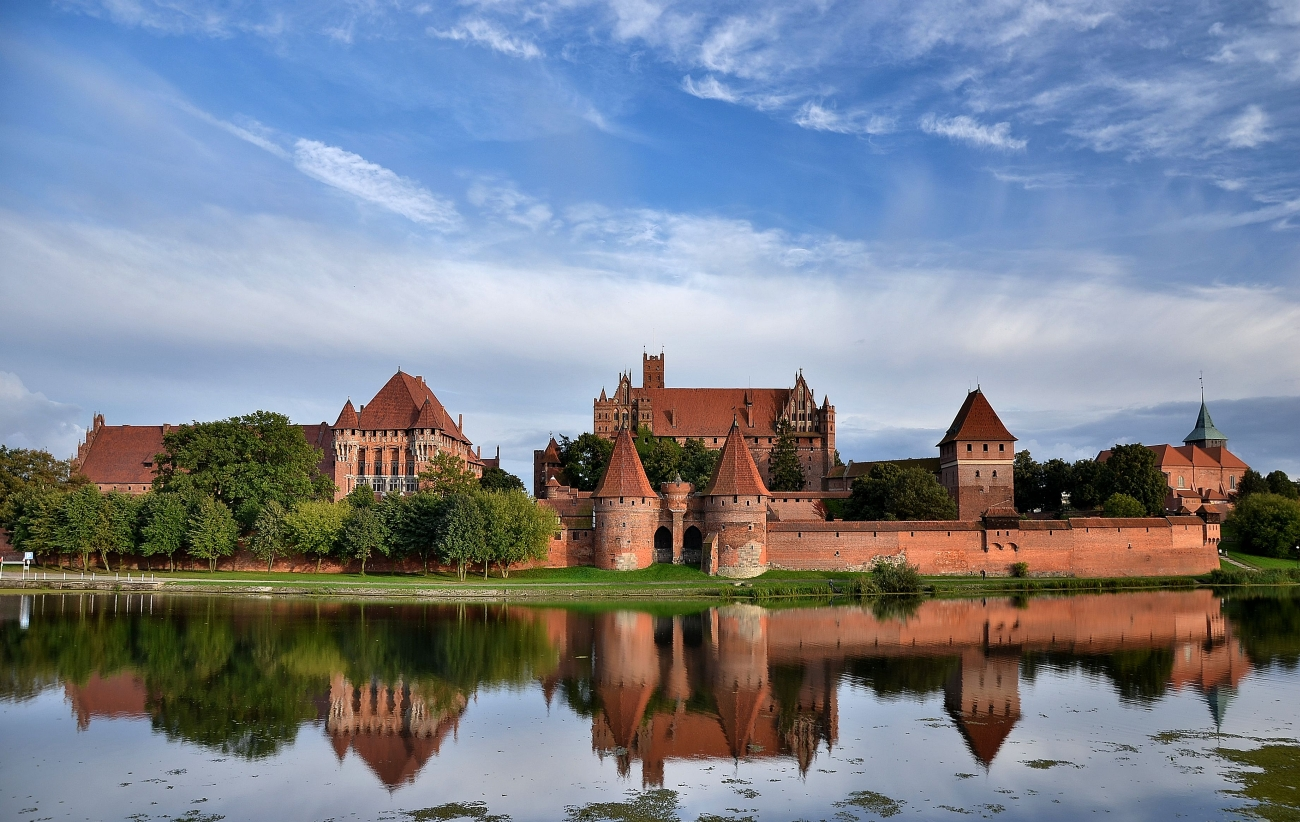
Teutonic Ordensburg in Malbork

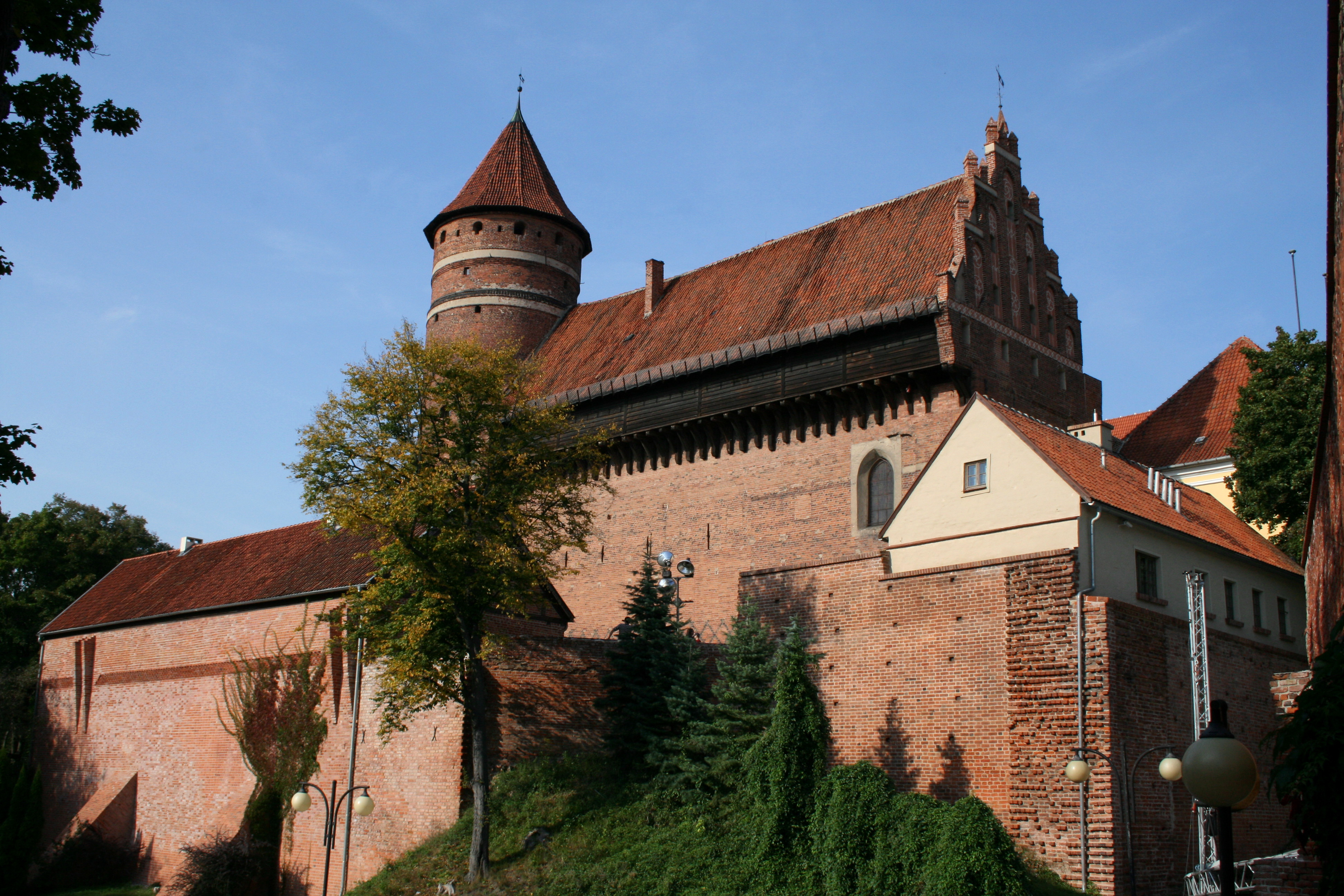
Castle of Warmian Bishops in Olsztyn

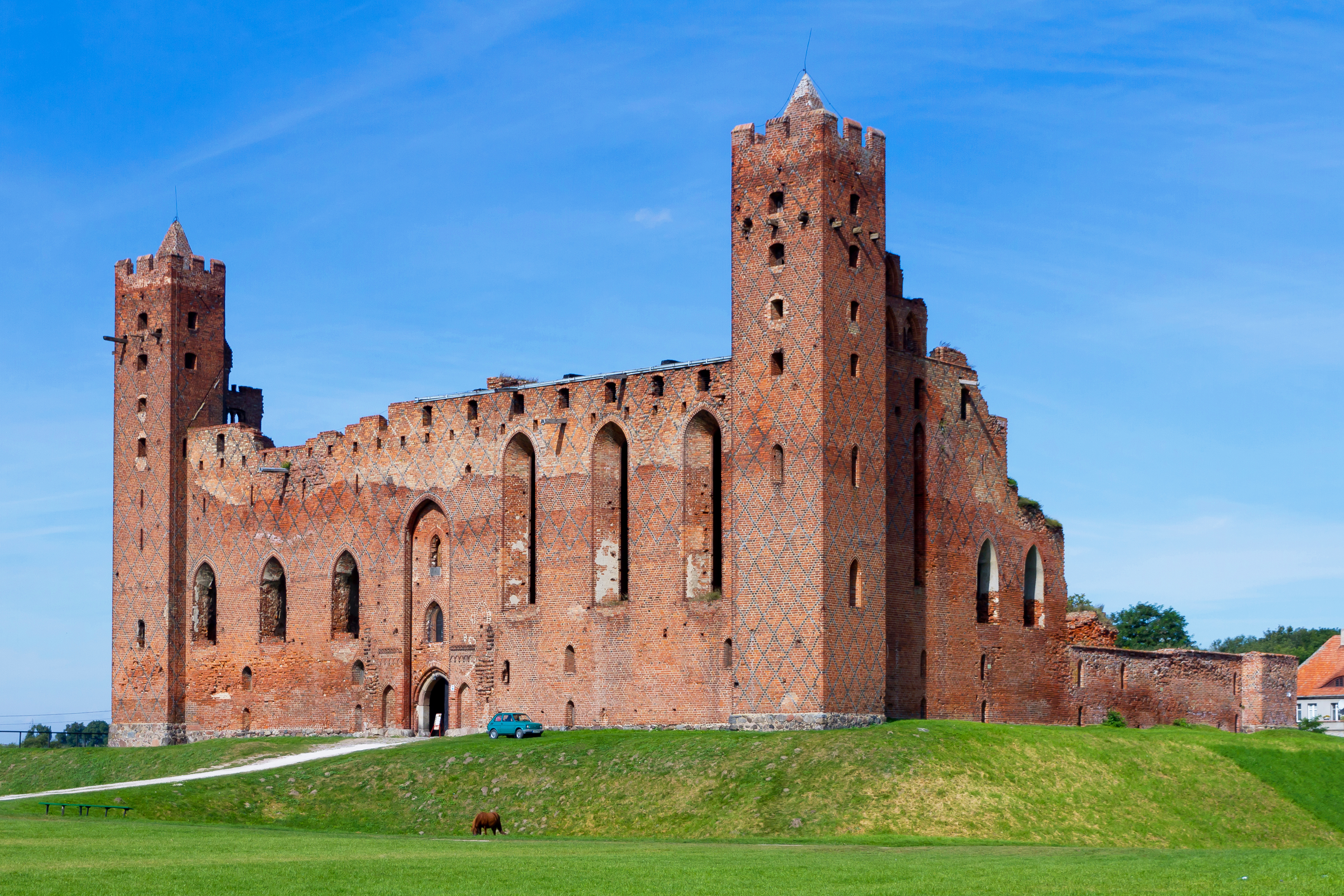
Teutonic Castle in Radzyń Chełmiński

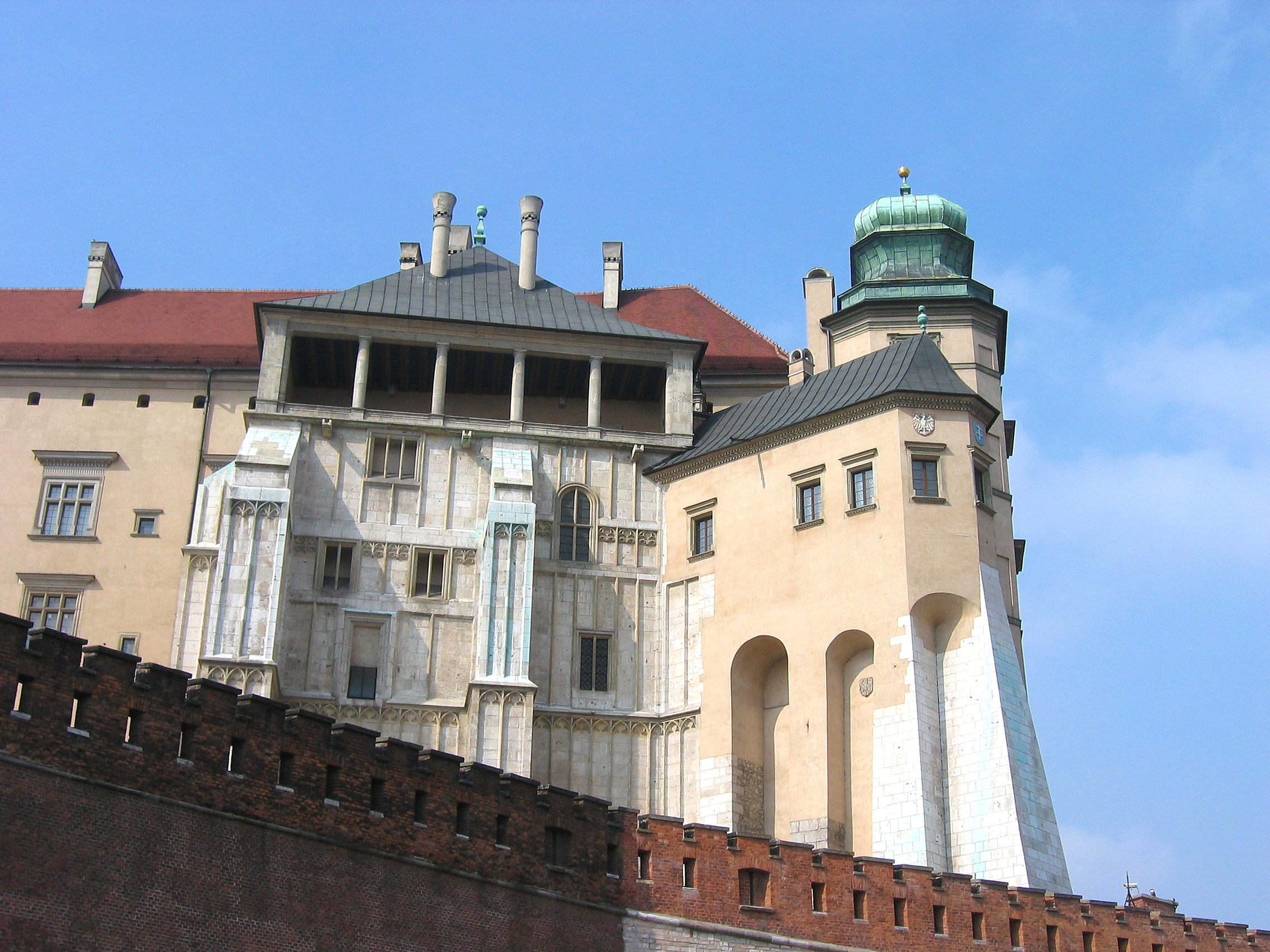
Medieval parts of Wawel Castle in Kraków

== Town halls ==
A town hall called Ratusz was a symbol of a city's power in the Middle Ages. Around the town hall were other buildings associated with the function of the urban organism: hall, municipal building, weight, merchant stalls and pillory. Examples of unconverted later Gothic town halls include the Wrocław Town Hall, the Old Town Hall in Toruń and town halls in Chojna, Gdańsk and Szczecin. Only the Gothic tower of the Ratusz town hall in Kraków has survived. The gothic town hall on the Old Town Market Square in Warsaw was demolished in 1820.

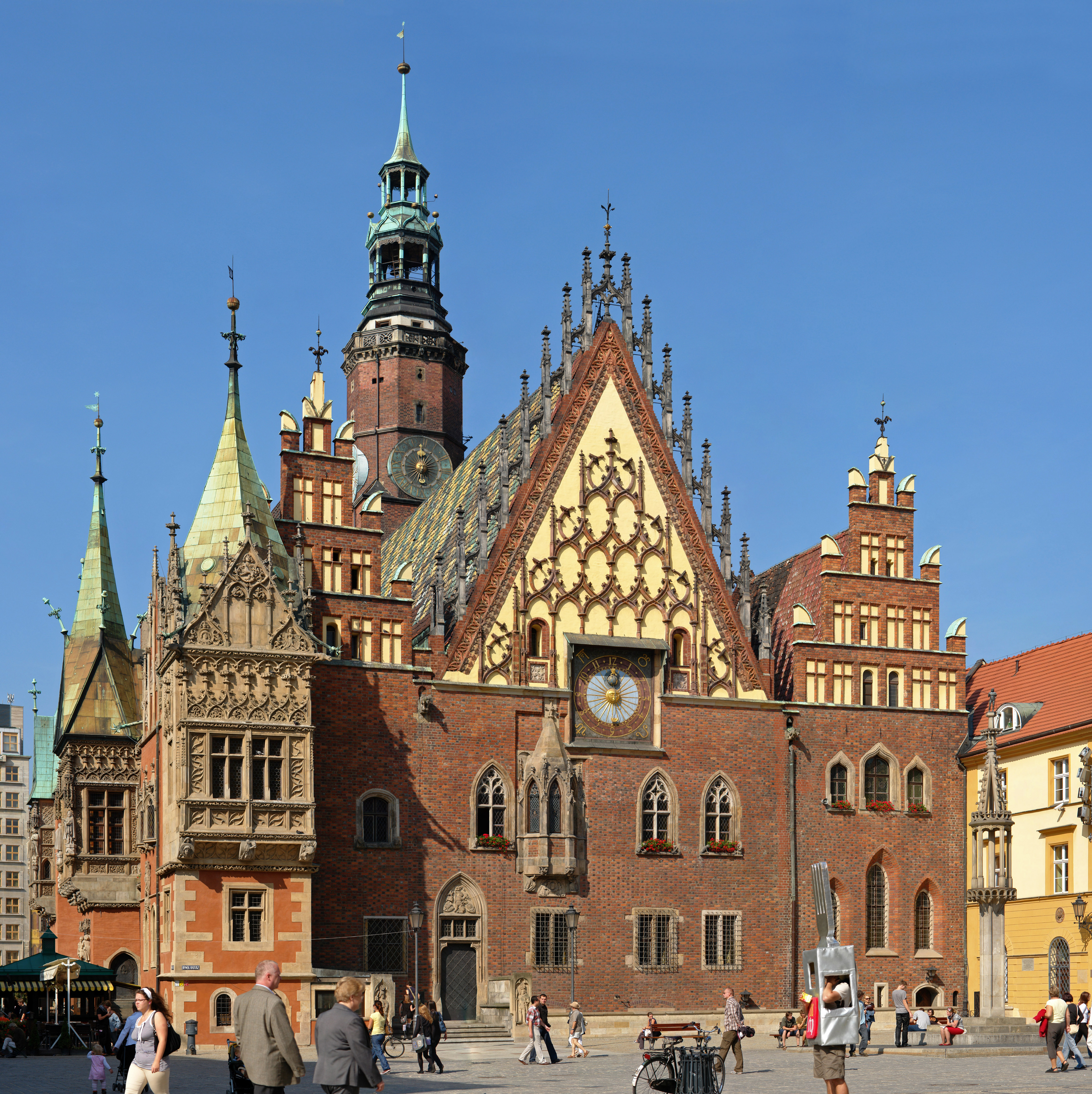
Wrocław Town Hall

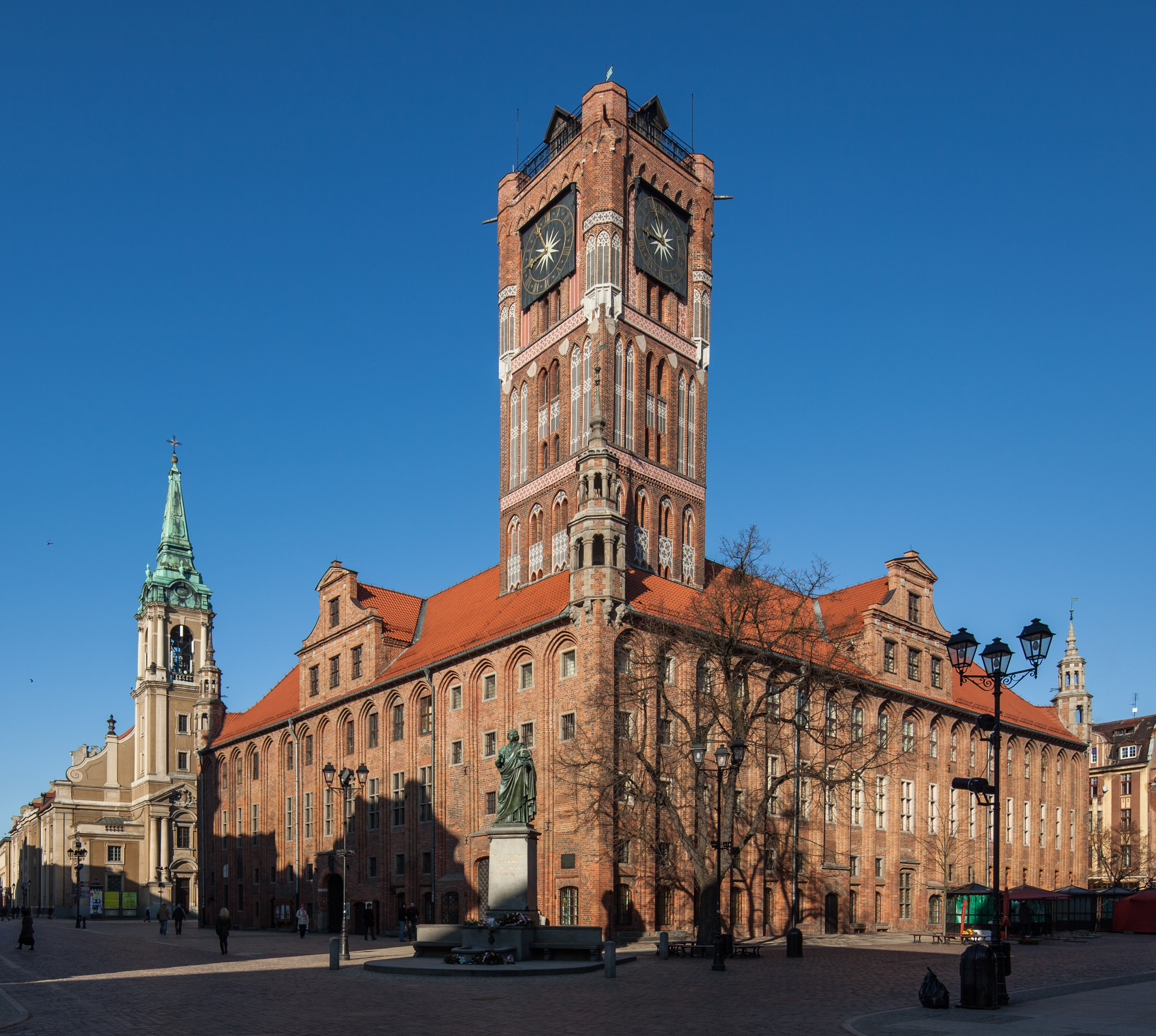
Toruń Old Town Hall

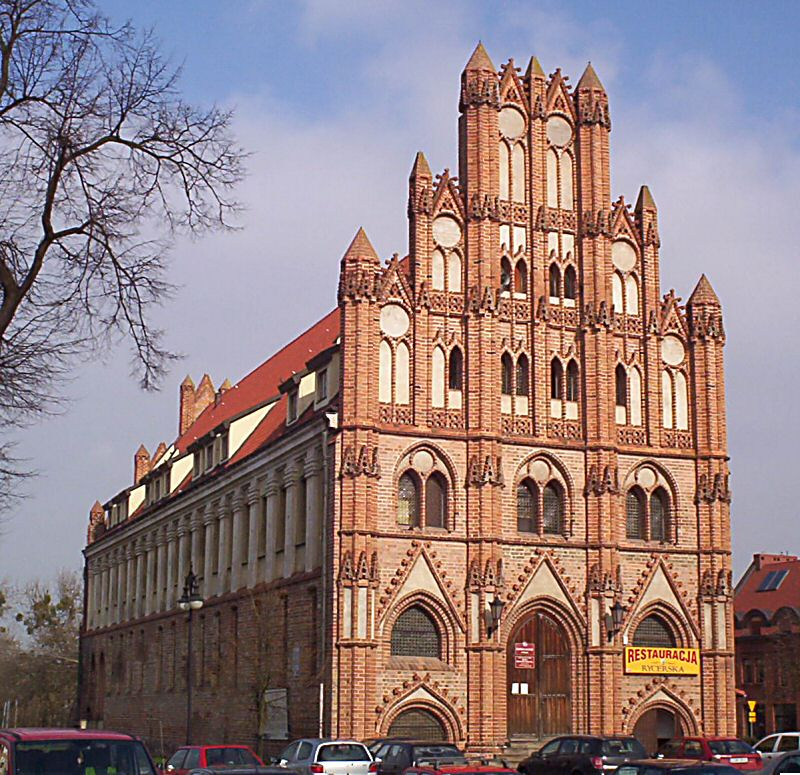
Chojna Town Hall

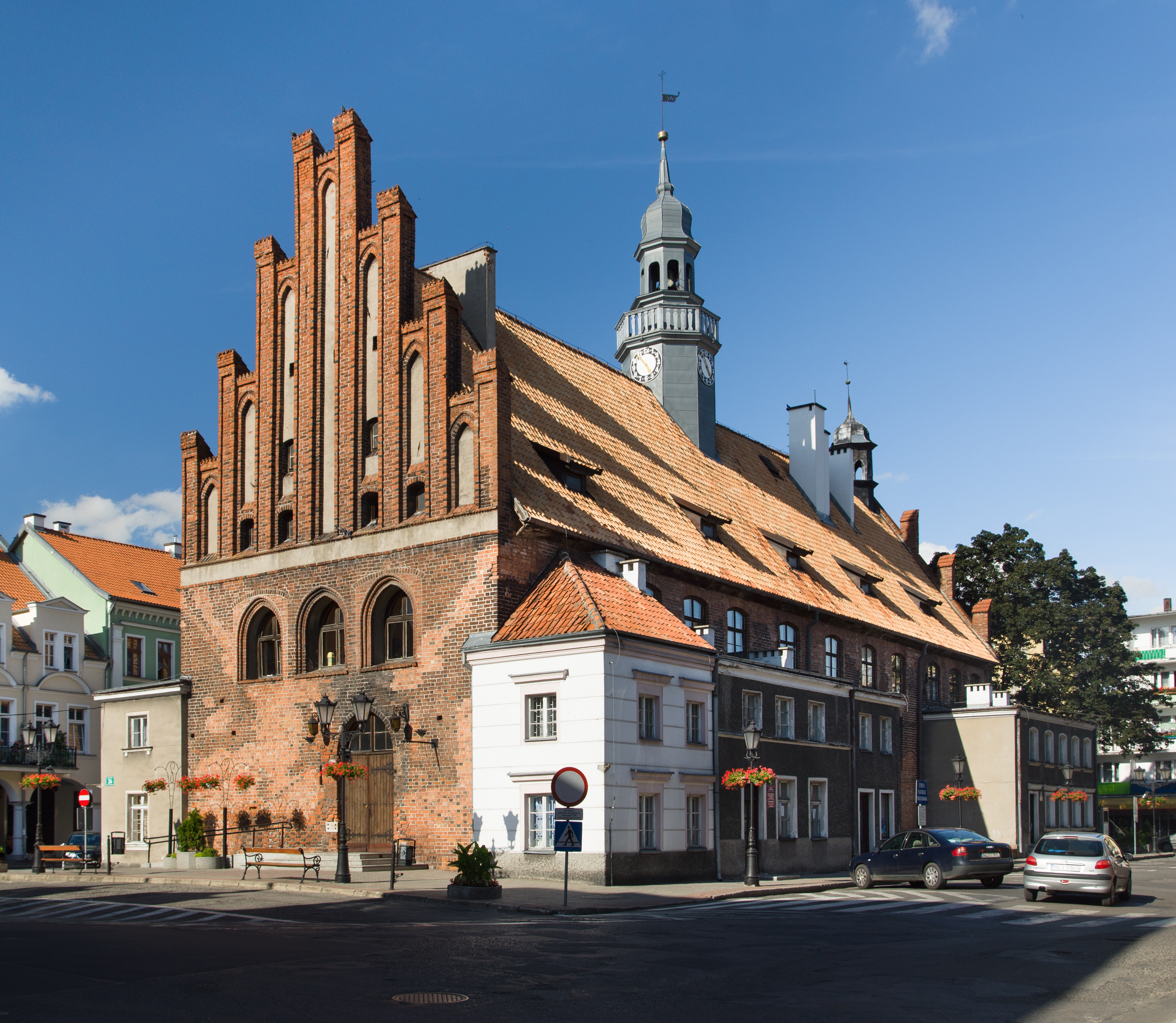
Orneta Town Hall

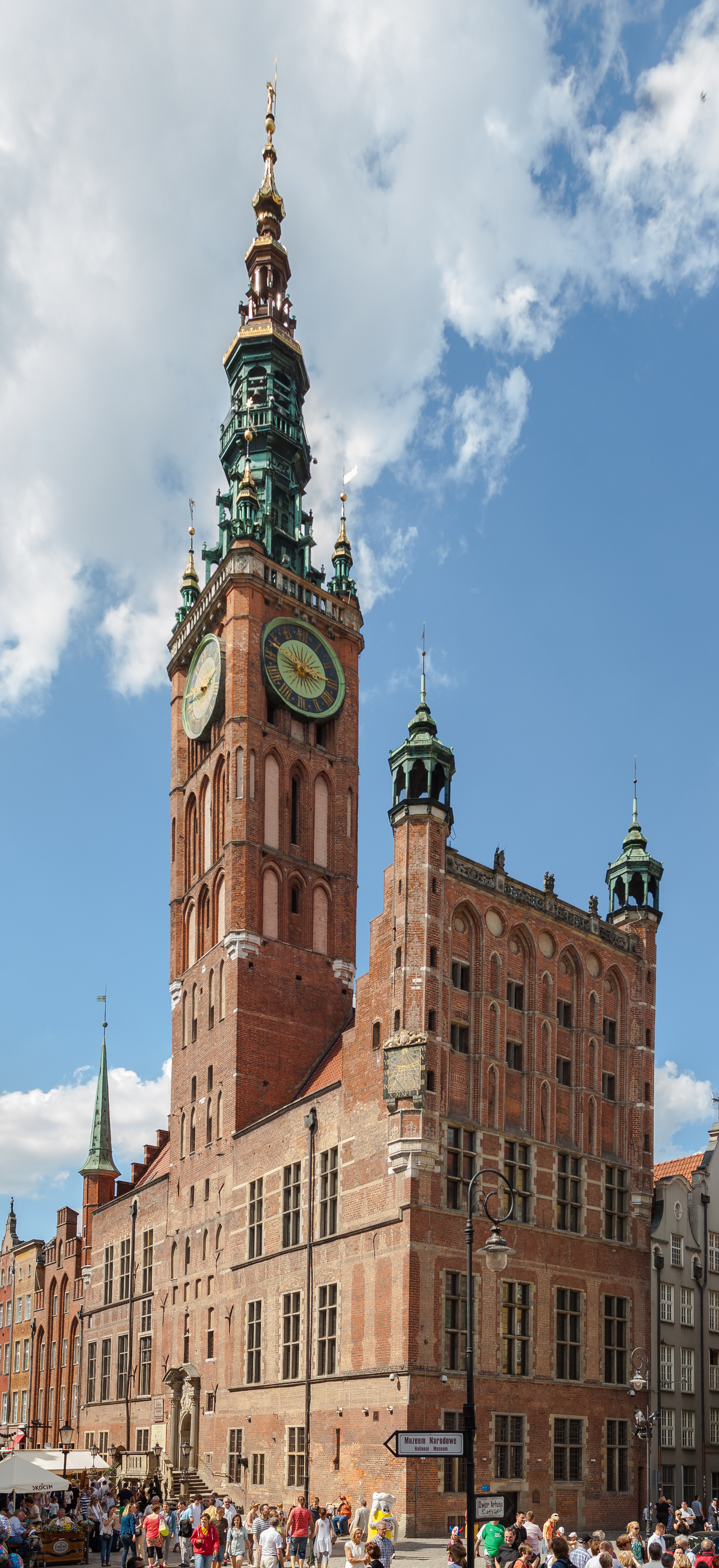
Gdańsk Town Hall

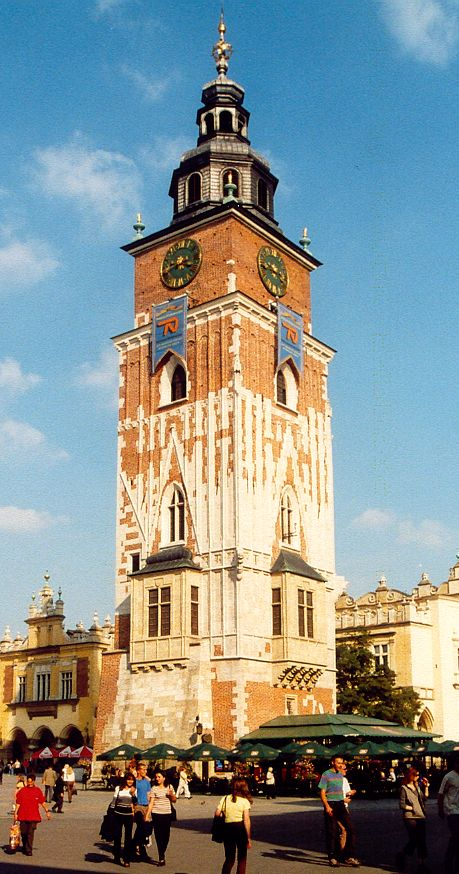
Tower of Kraków Town Hall

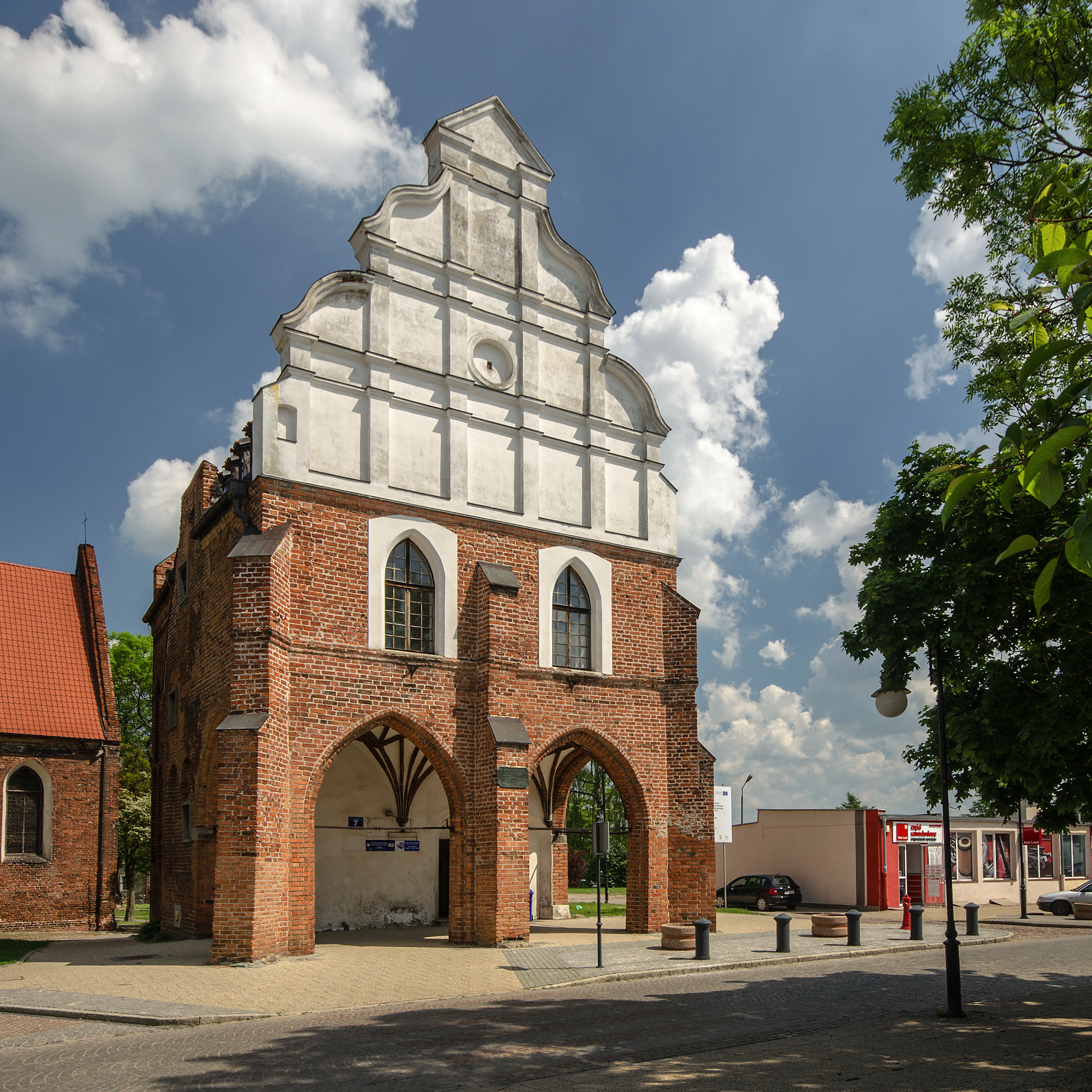
Pasłęk Town Hall

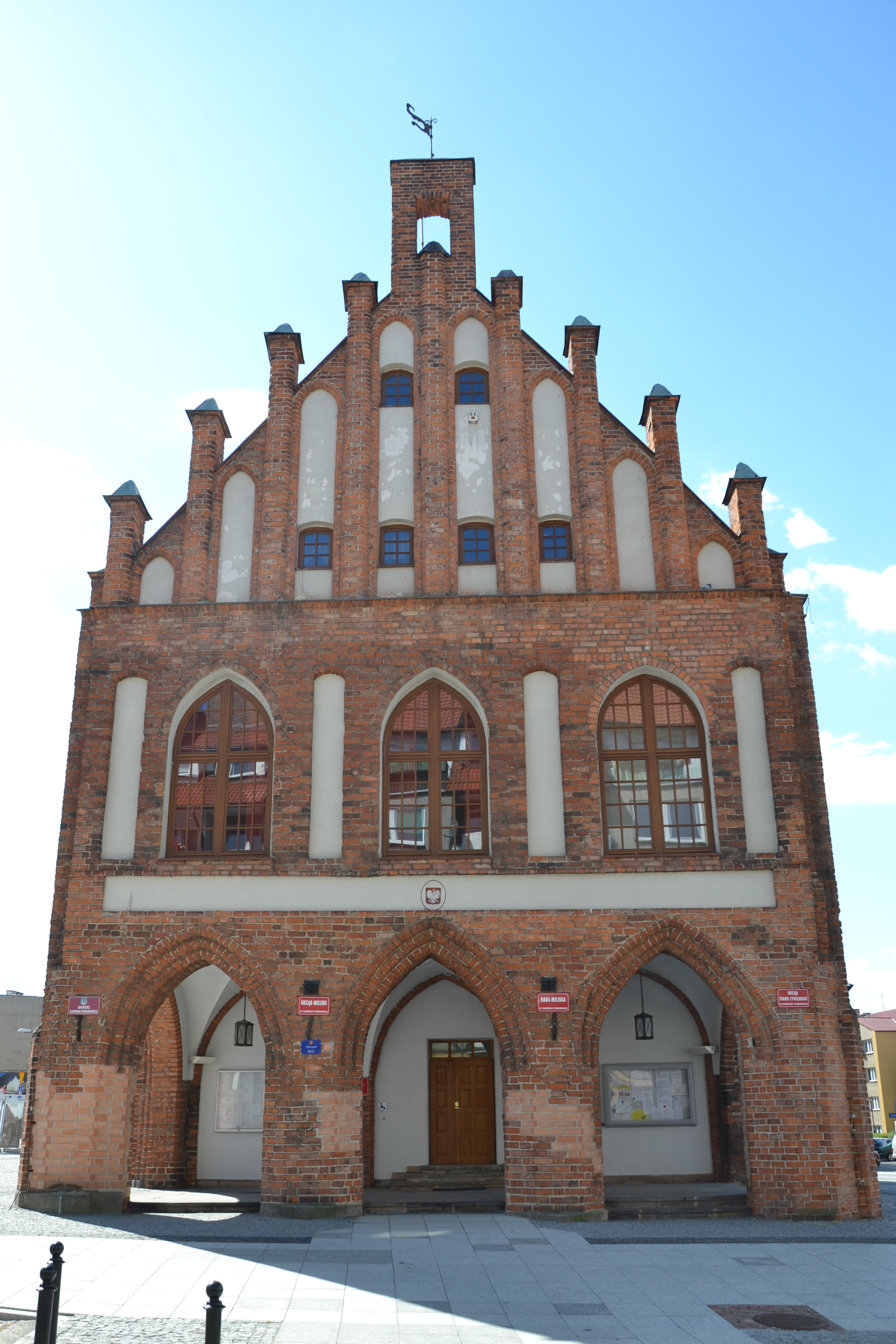
Kamień Pomorski Town Hall

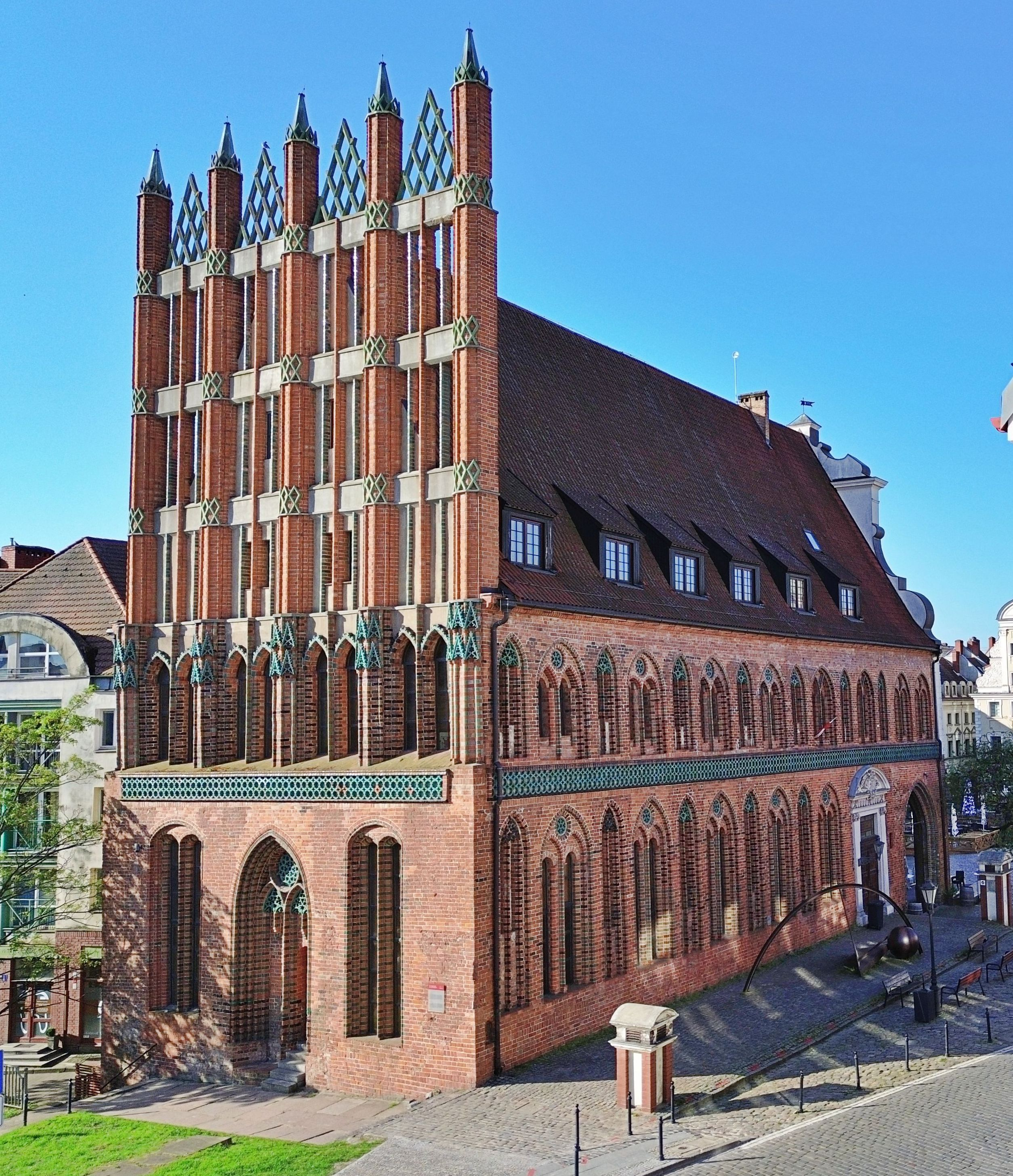
Szczecin Town Hall

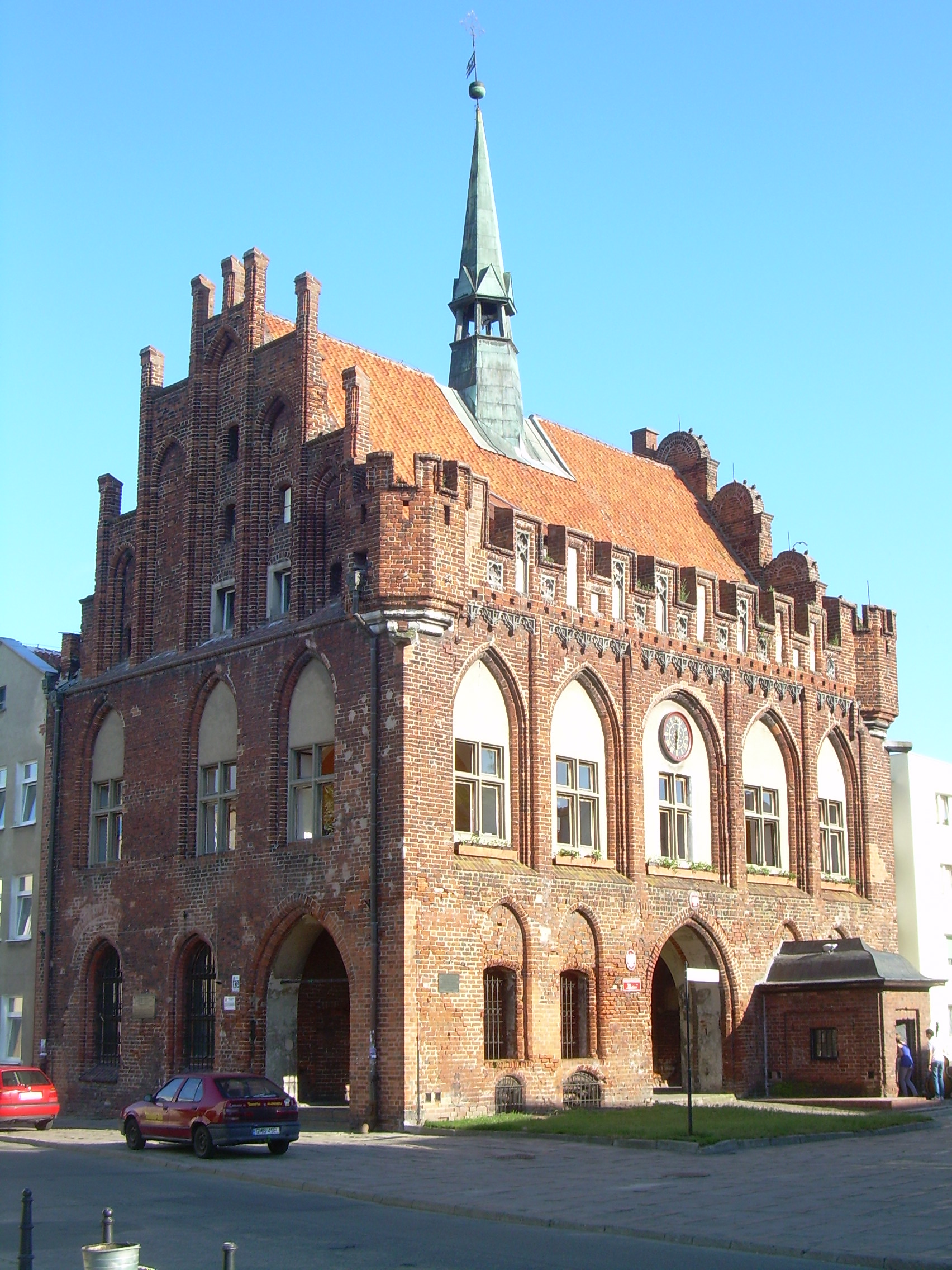
Malbork Town Hall

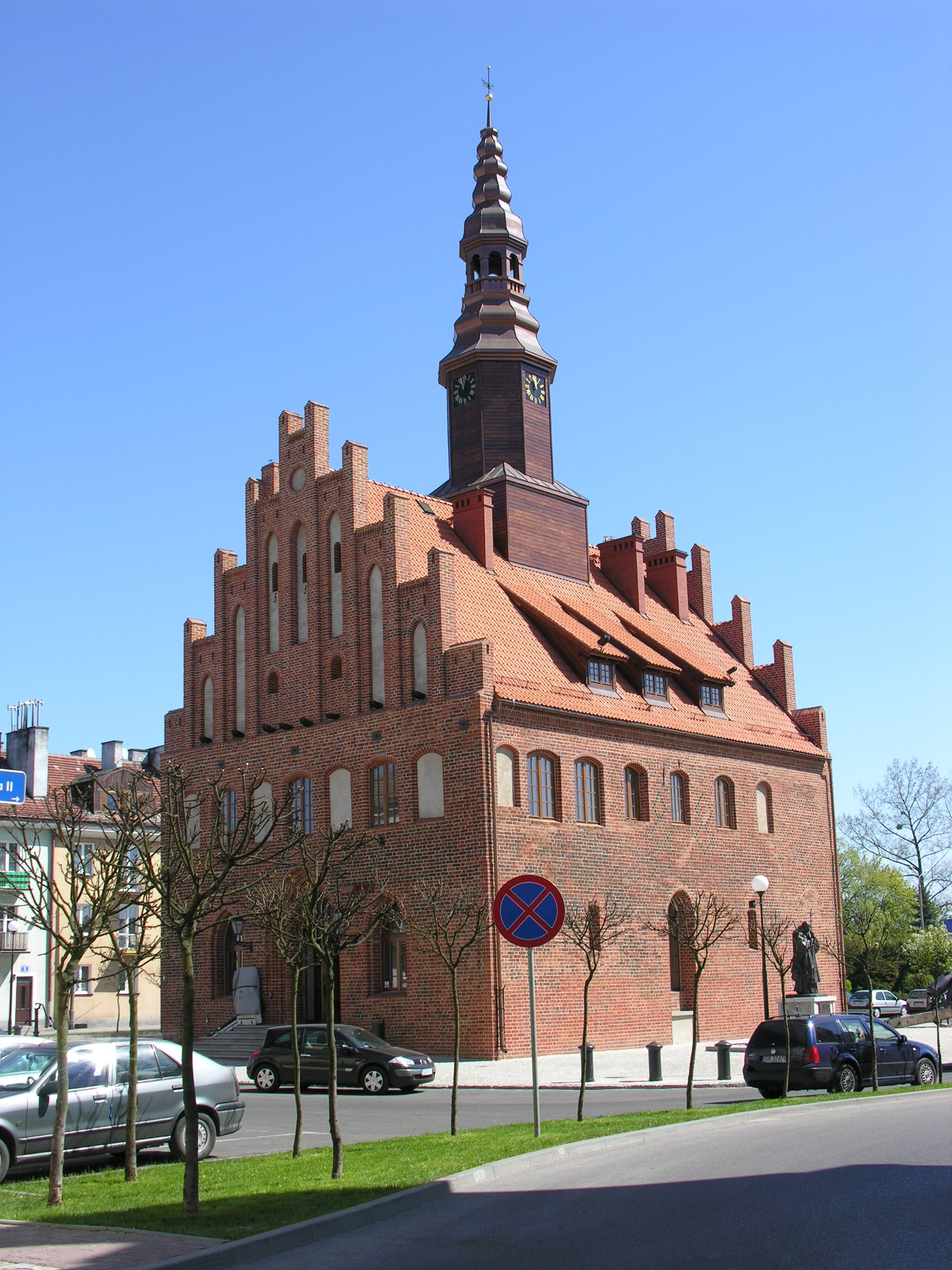
Morąg Town Hall

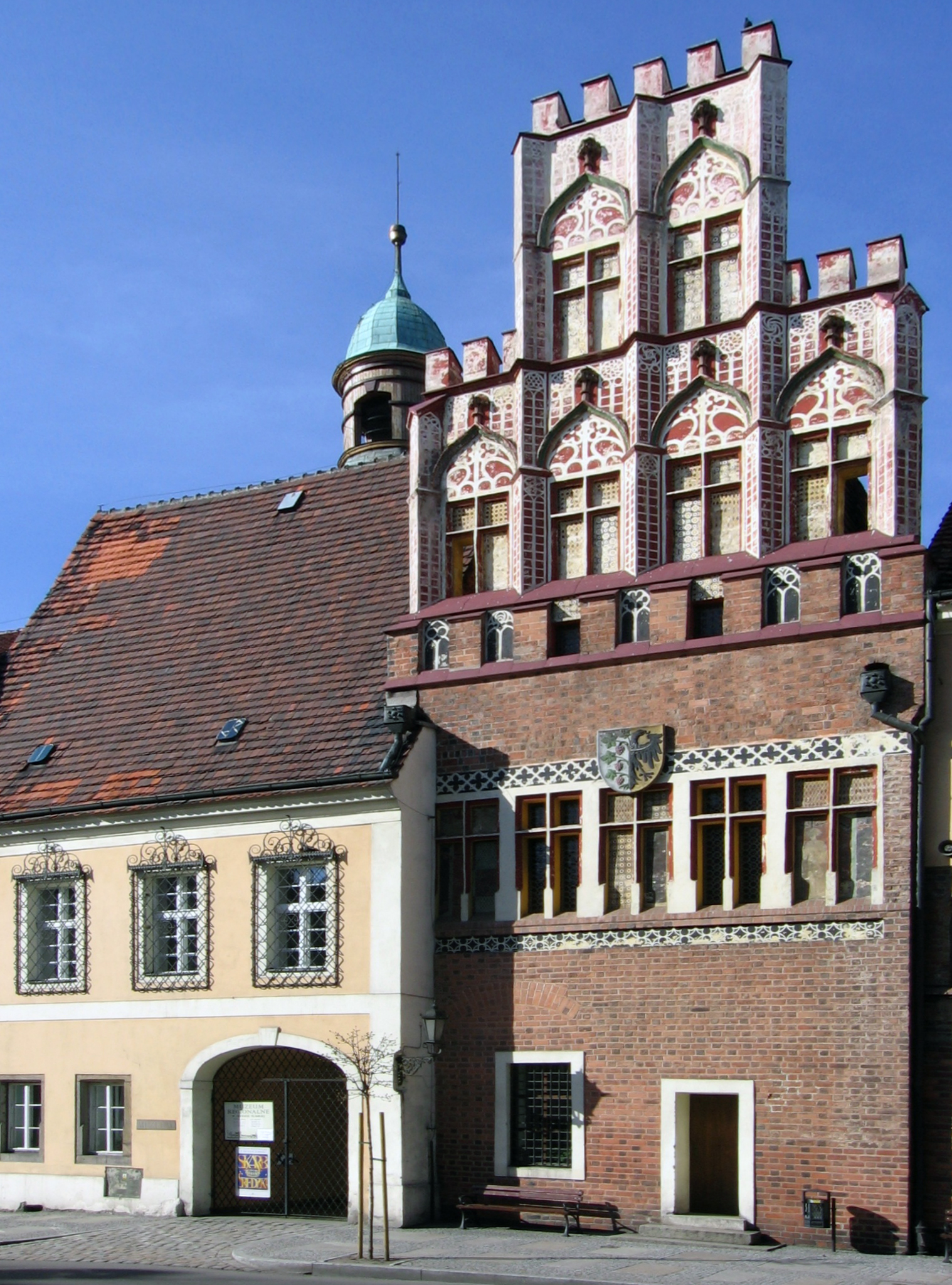
Środa Śląska Town Hall

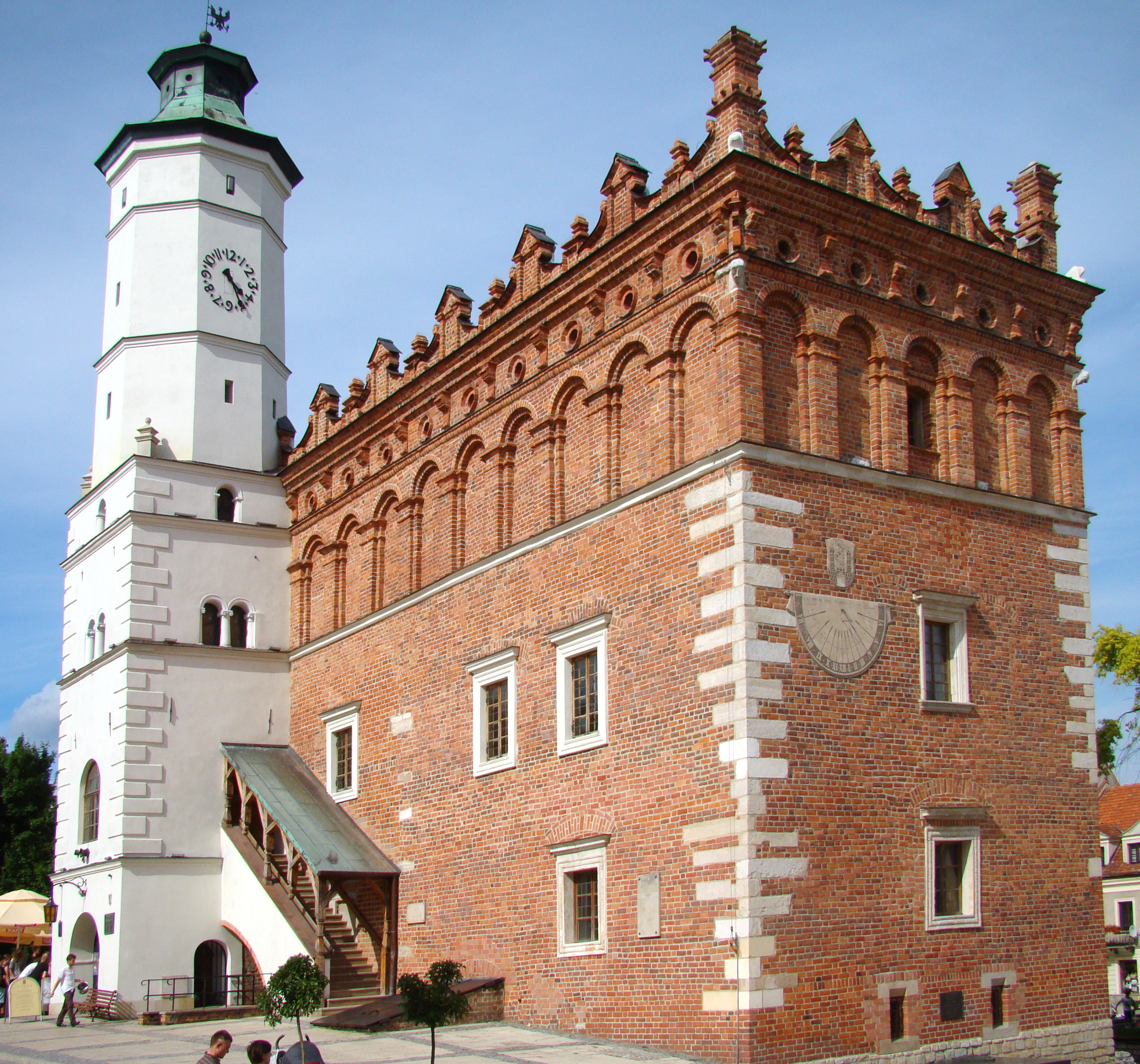
Sandomierz Town Hall

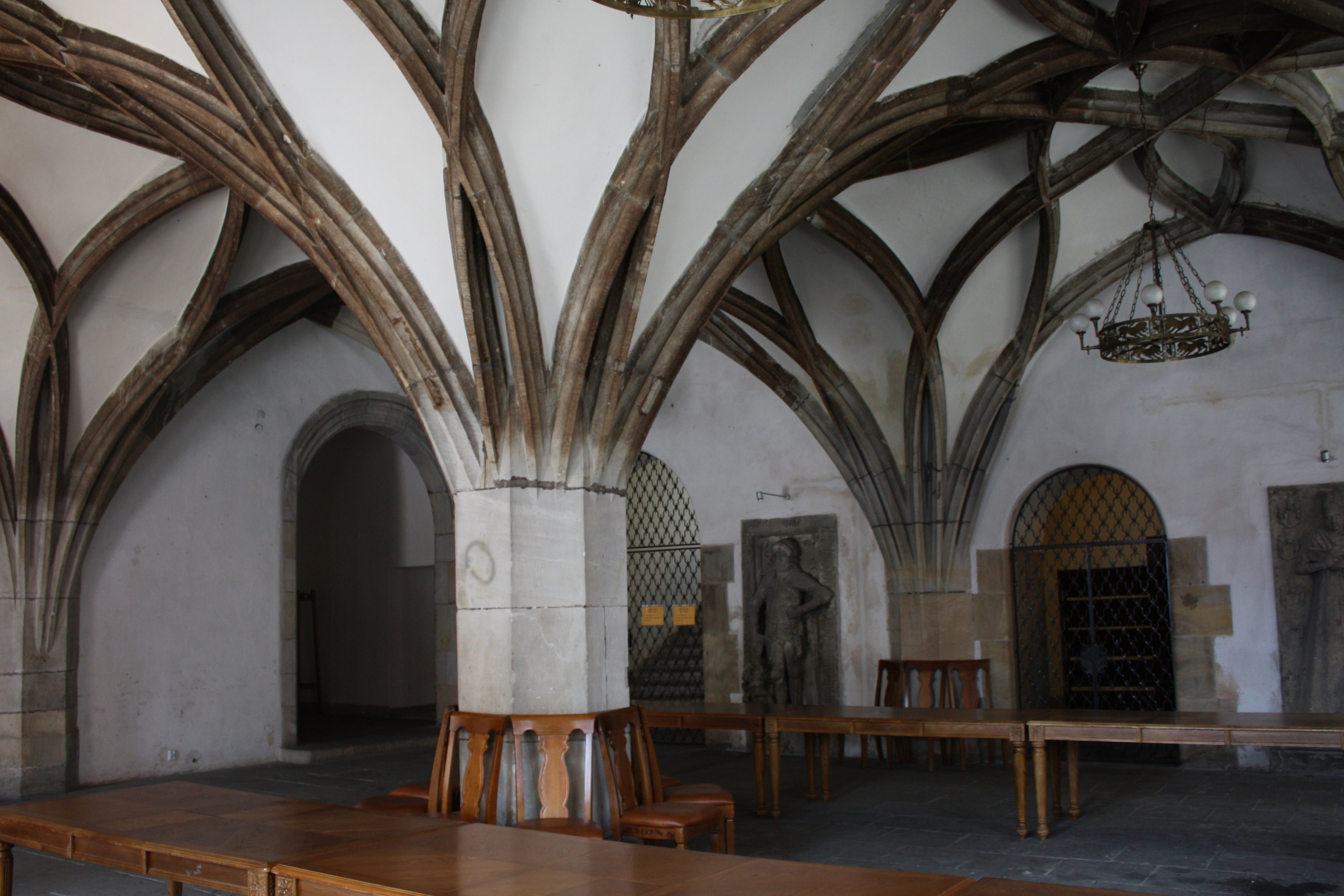
Lwówek Śląski Town Hall

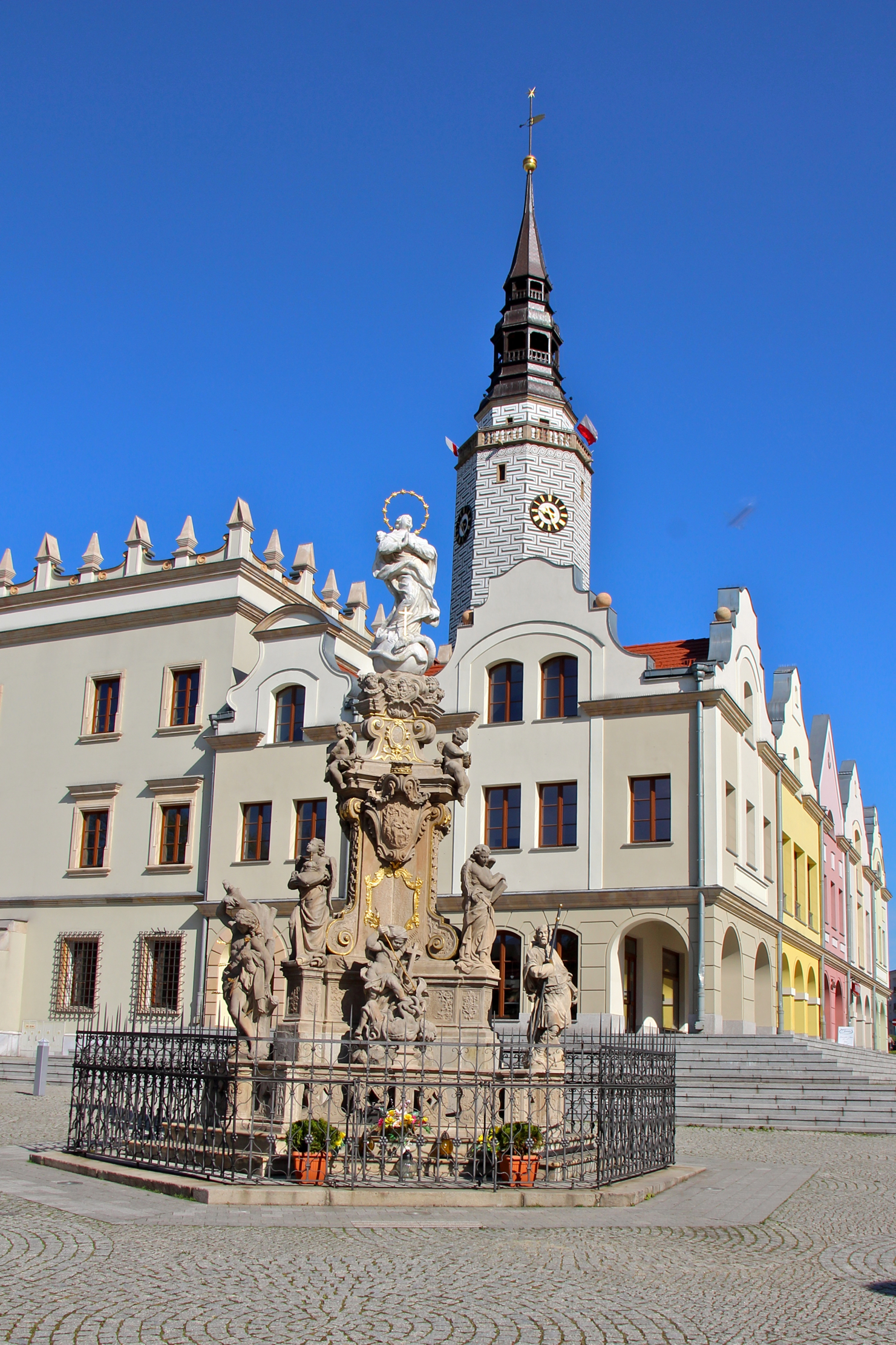
Głubczyce Town Hall

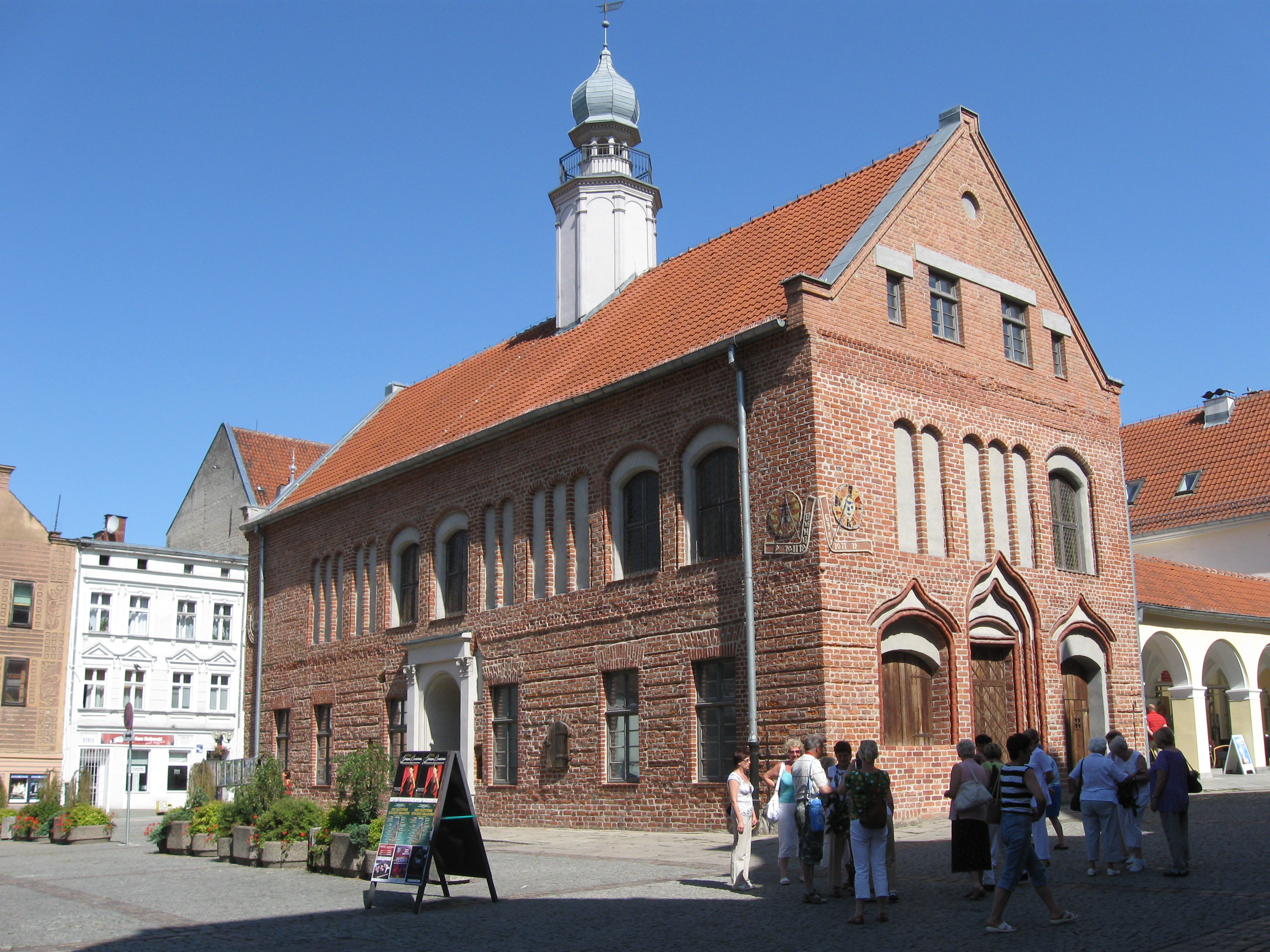
Olsztyn Old Town Hall

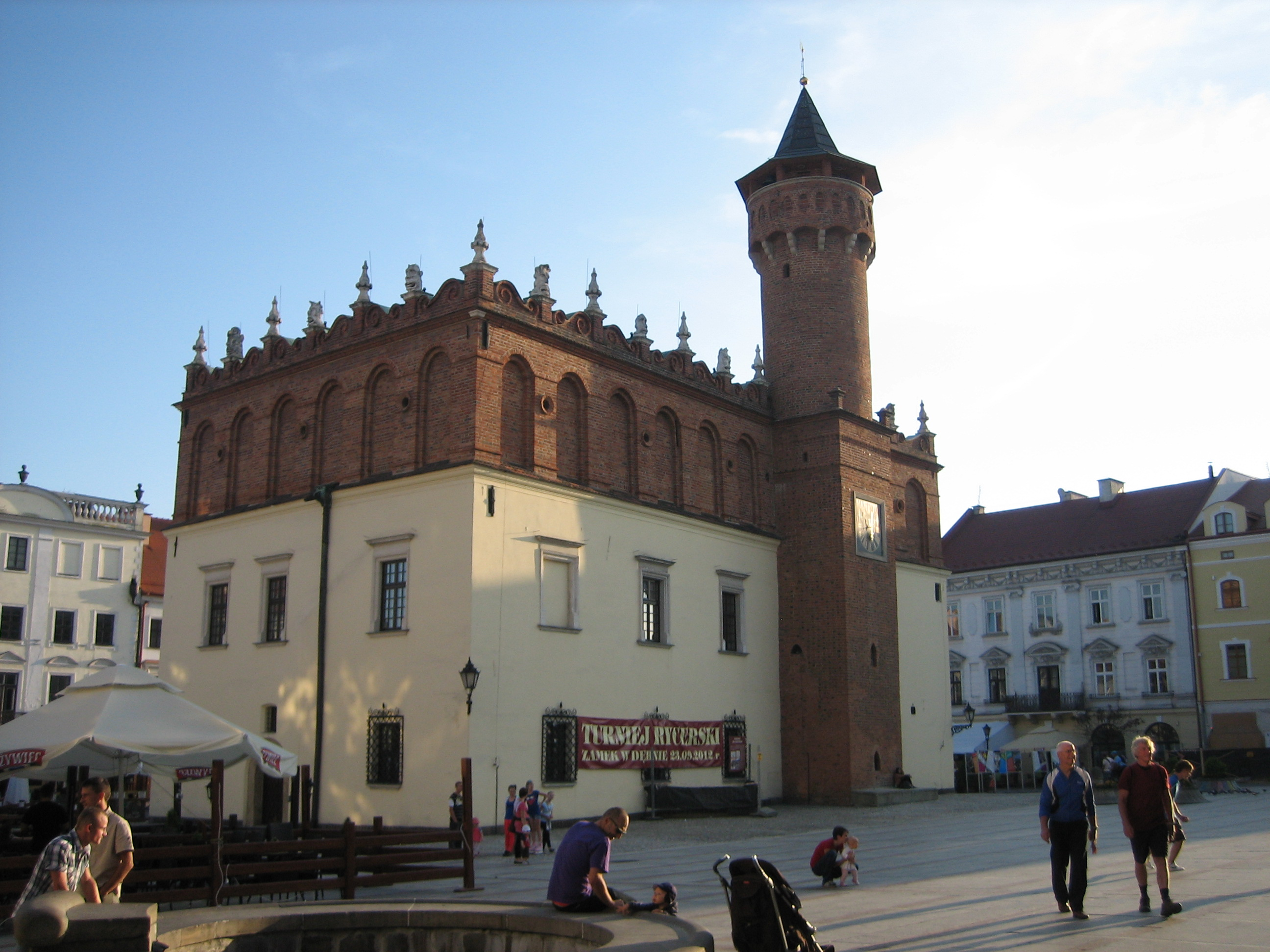
Tarnów Town Hall

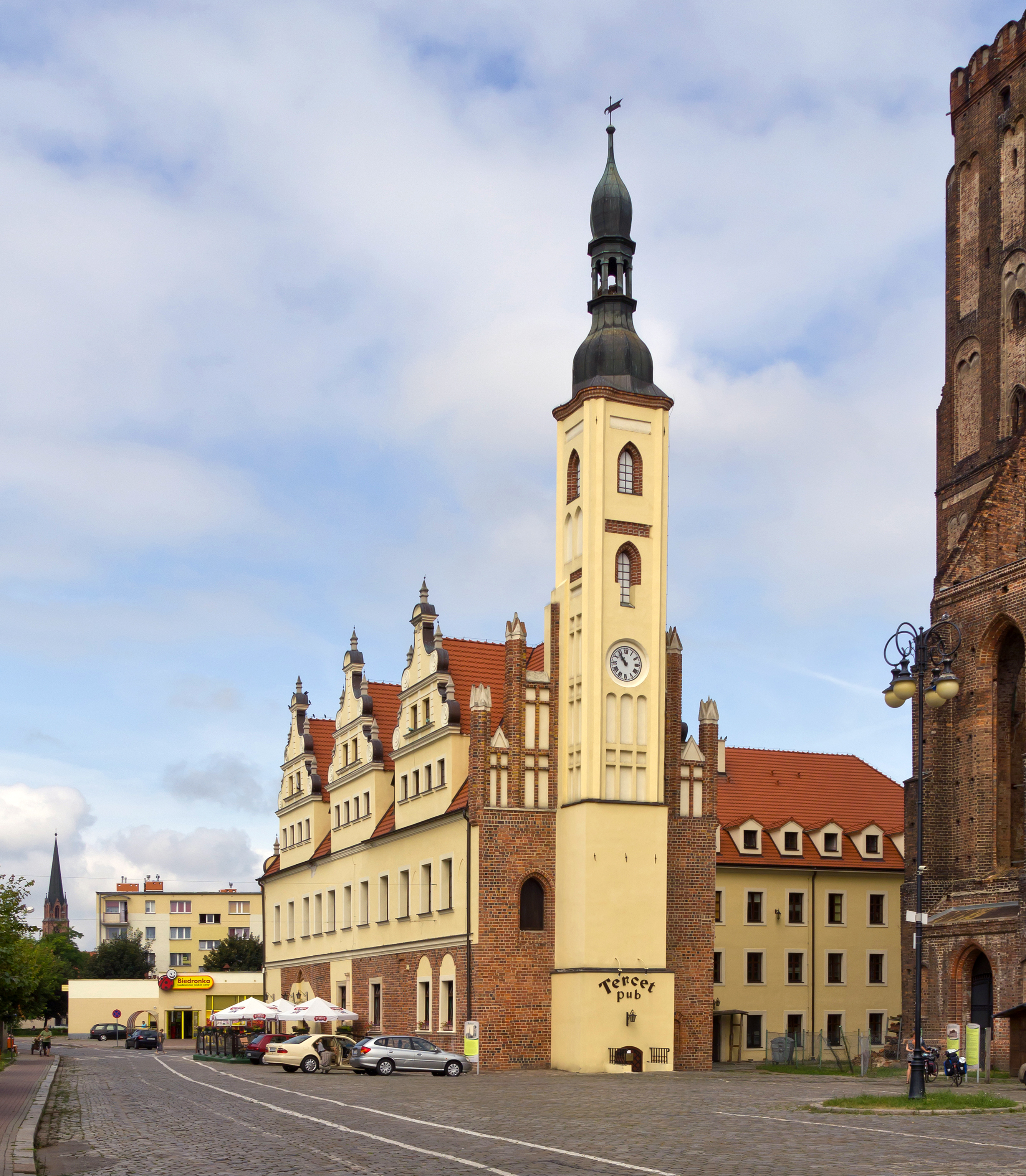
Gubin Town Hall

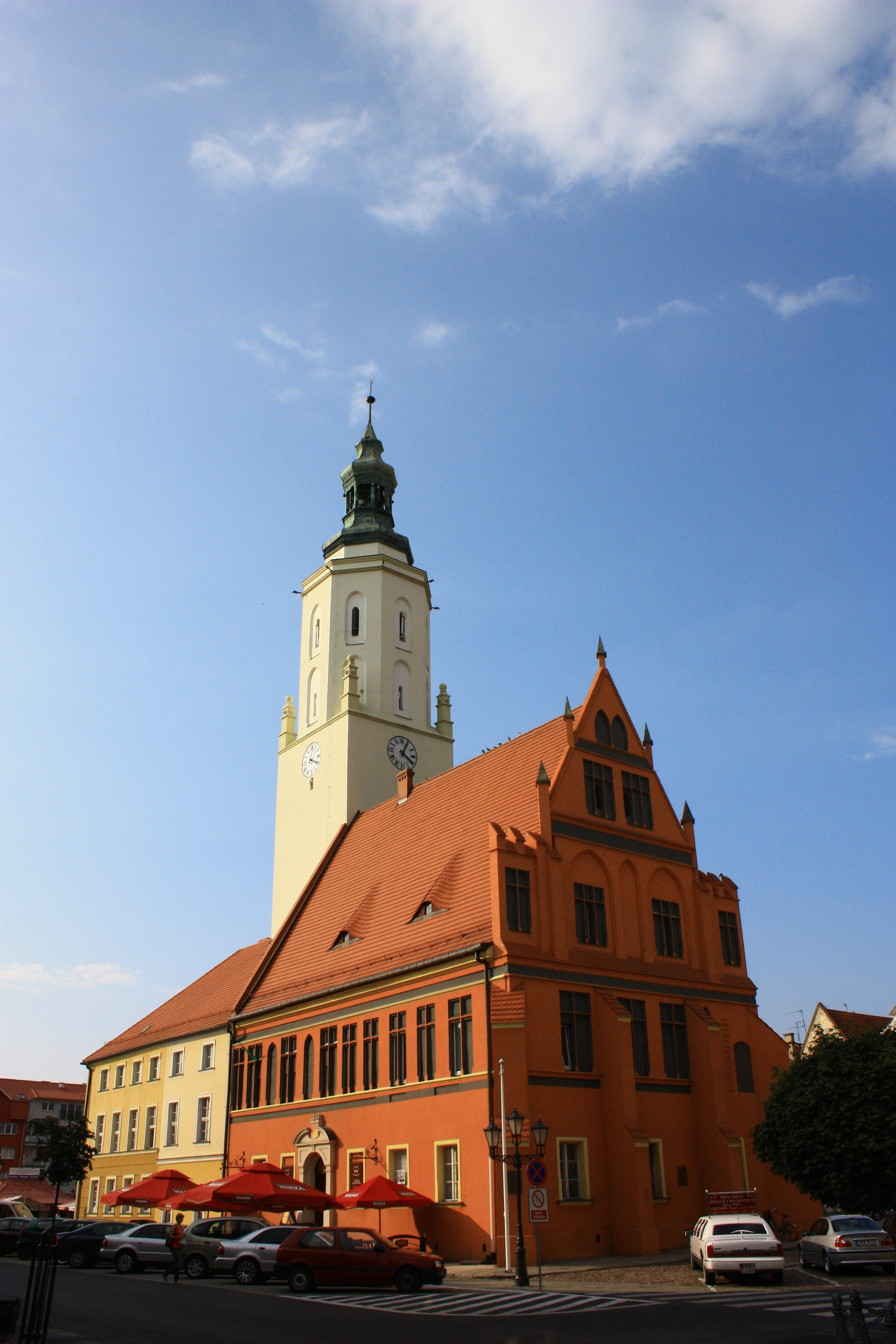
Namysłów Town Hall

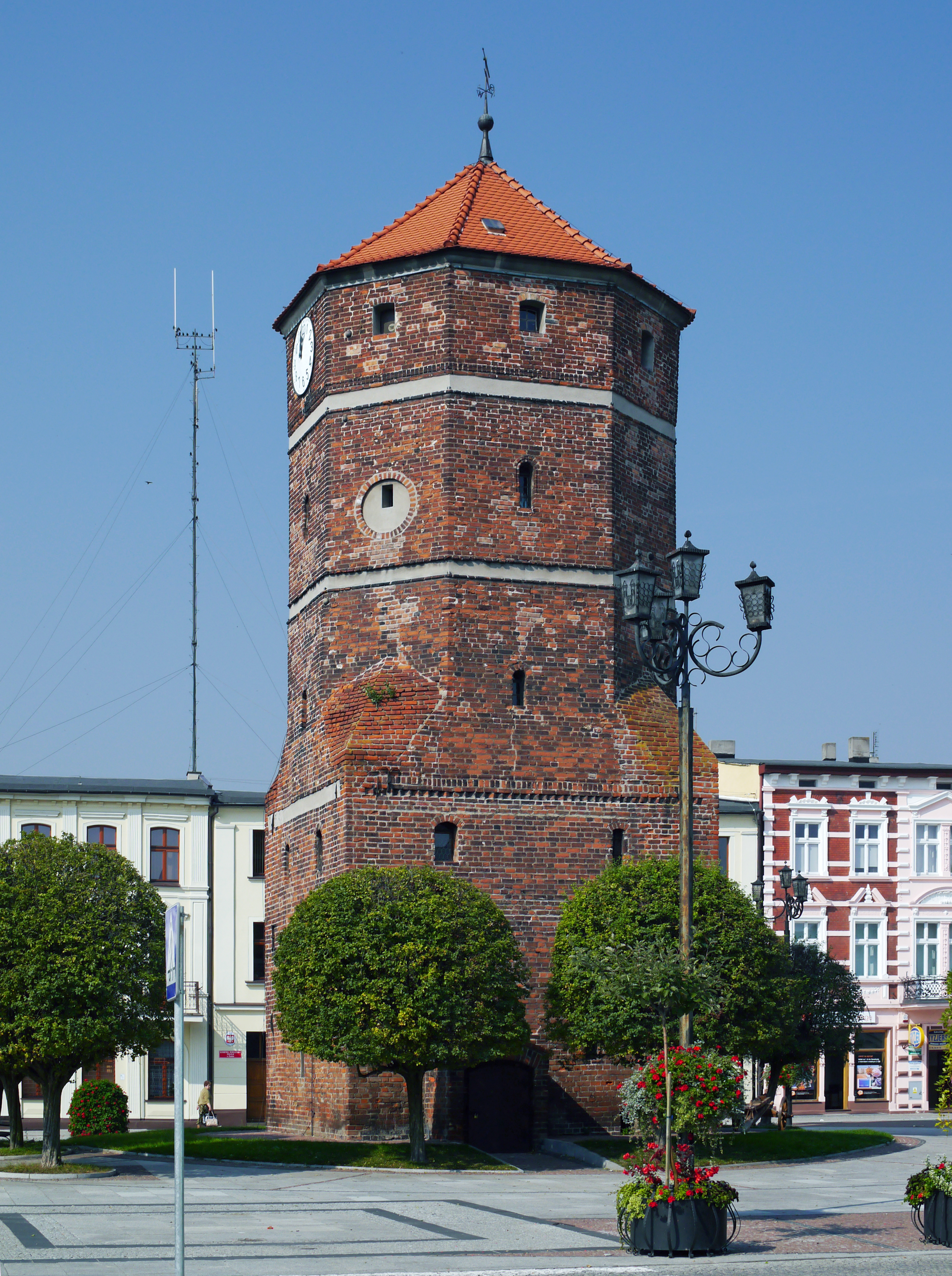
Tower of Żnin Town Hall

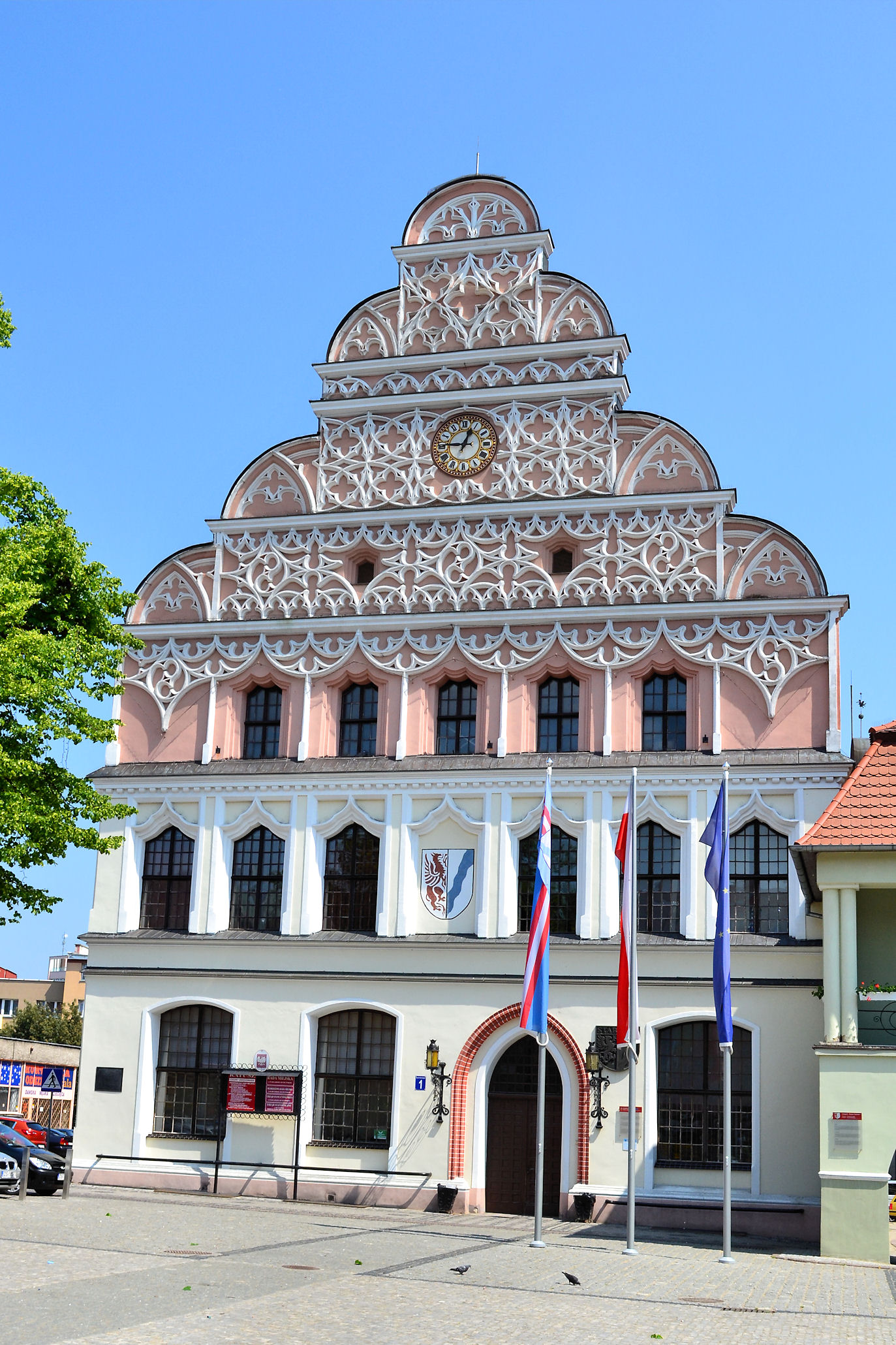
Stargard Town Hall

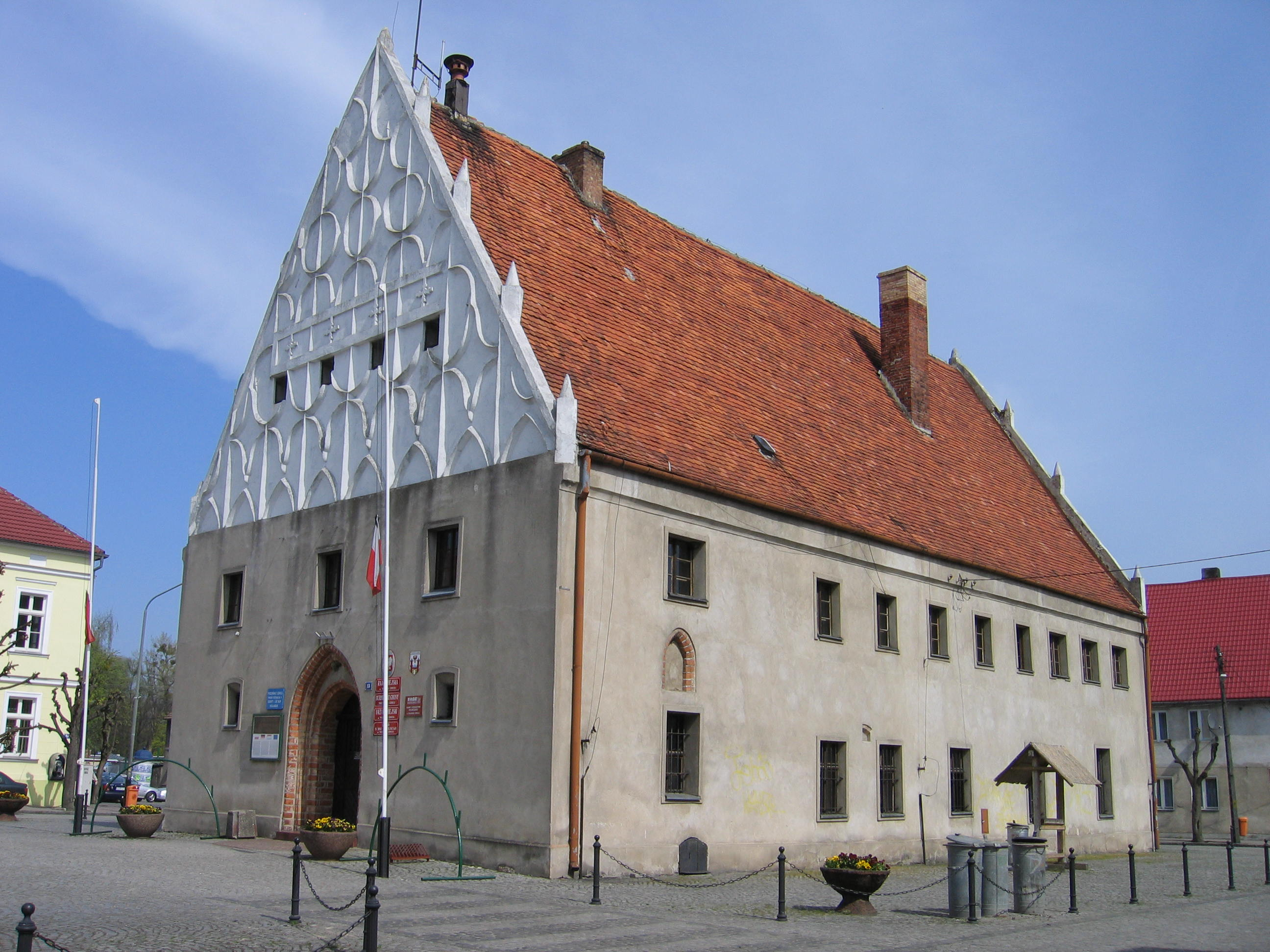
Trzcińsko-Zdrój Town Hall

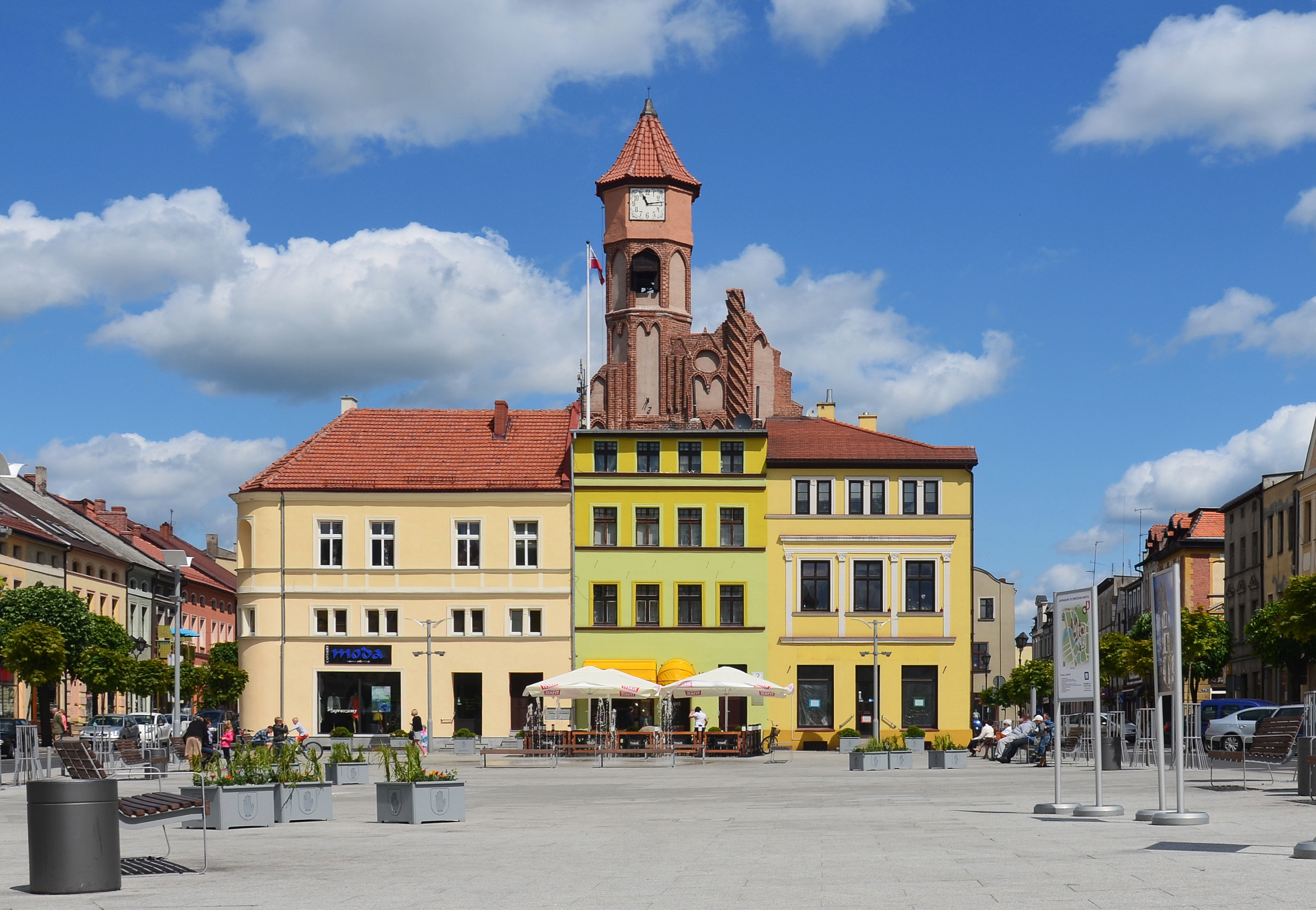
Turret of Brodnica Town Hall

== Houses ==
Existing settlements received in the 13th and 14th centuries tracking new laws (usually based on Magdeburg Law). Urban area is usually divided grid of streets perpendicular to the plot by creating a chessboard layout. Residential buildings, in the upper reaches is still built of wood or timber-framed art. In order to prevent the transmission of fire during the fire, often the wall was increased at the border of two adjacent parcels and tracts of gable roof receives addressed to the agent. Facades of houses stepped or triangular peaks. Houses of rich burghers sometimes received in the form of a richer decor. More often it was a topic mimicking polychrome wall, and wimpergi tracery. An example of building in the Gothic style is the house of Copernicus in Torun, in Sandomierz Długosz House, oldest building of Jagiellonian University – Collegium Maius, building on ul. Łazienna 22 in Toruń.

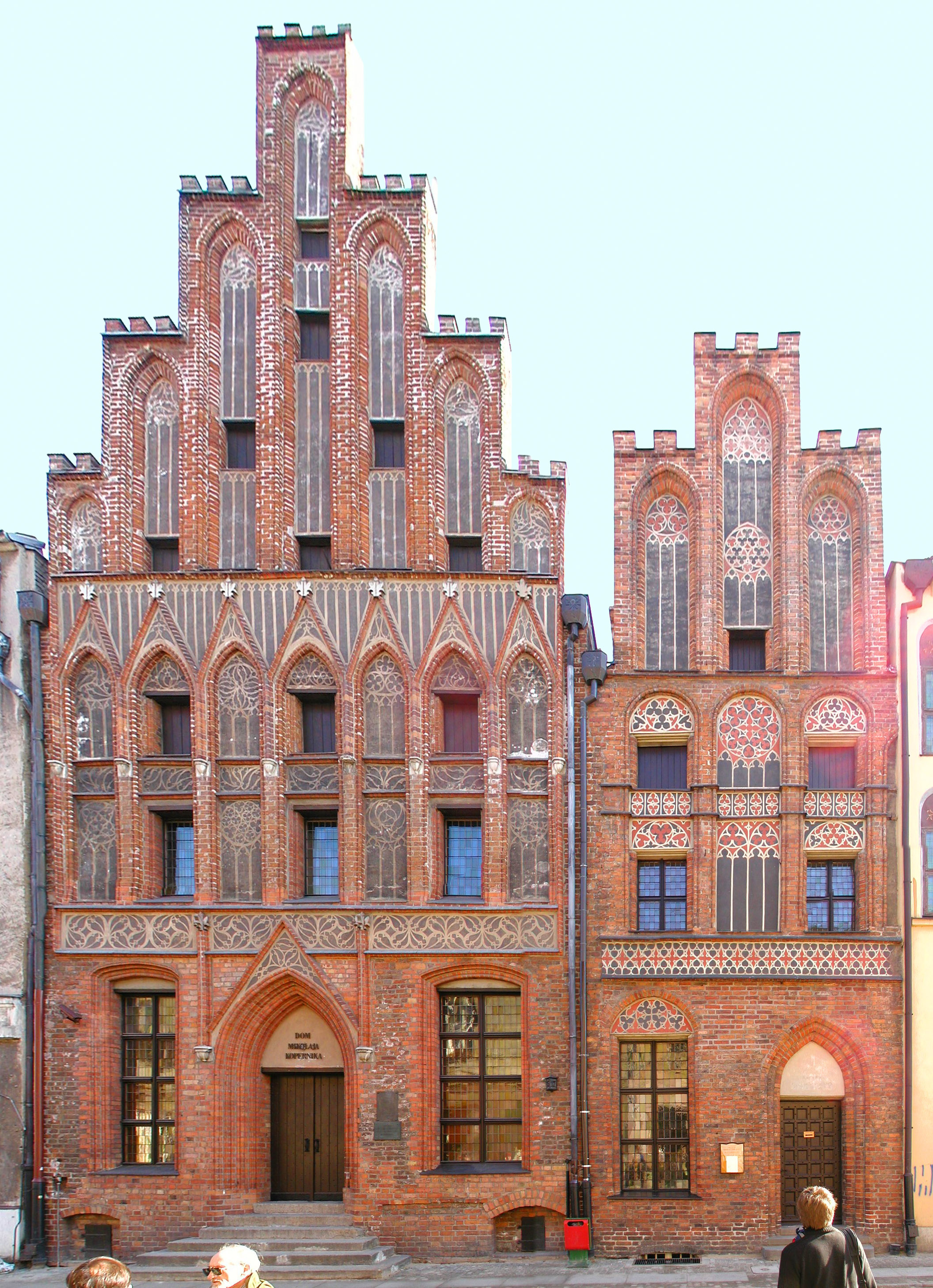
Copernicus House, Toruń

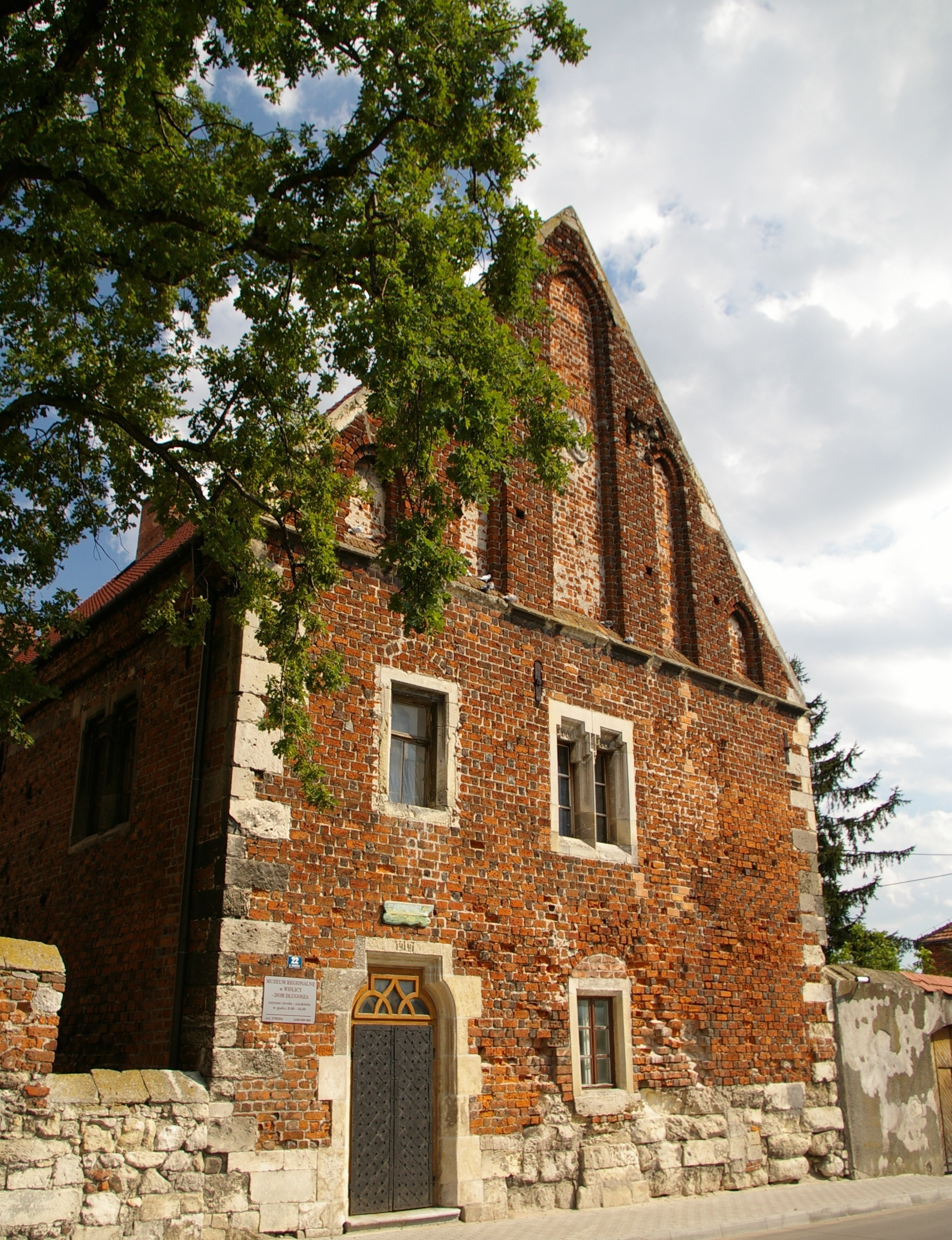
Długosz House, Wiślica

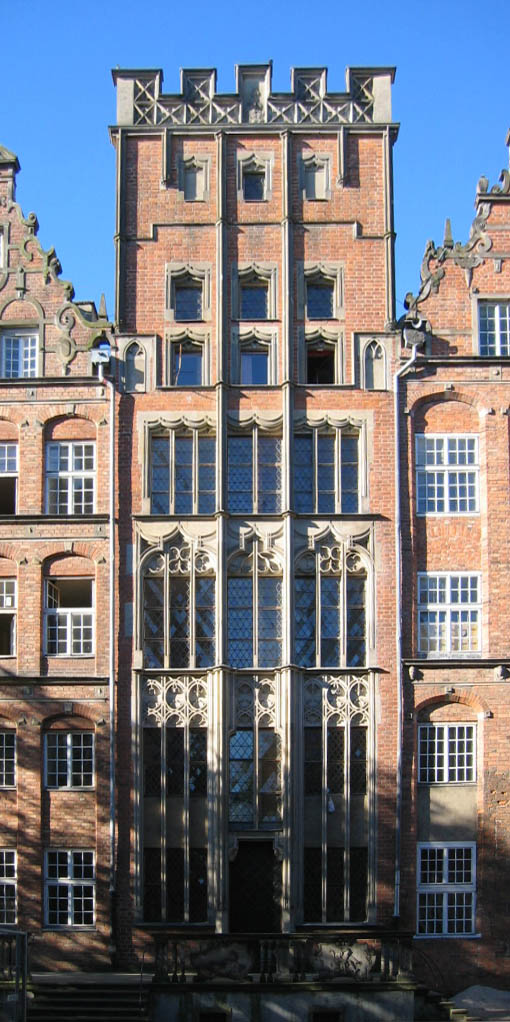
Schlieff Tenement in Gdańsk

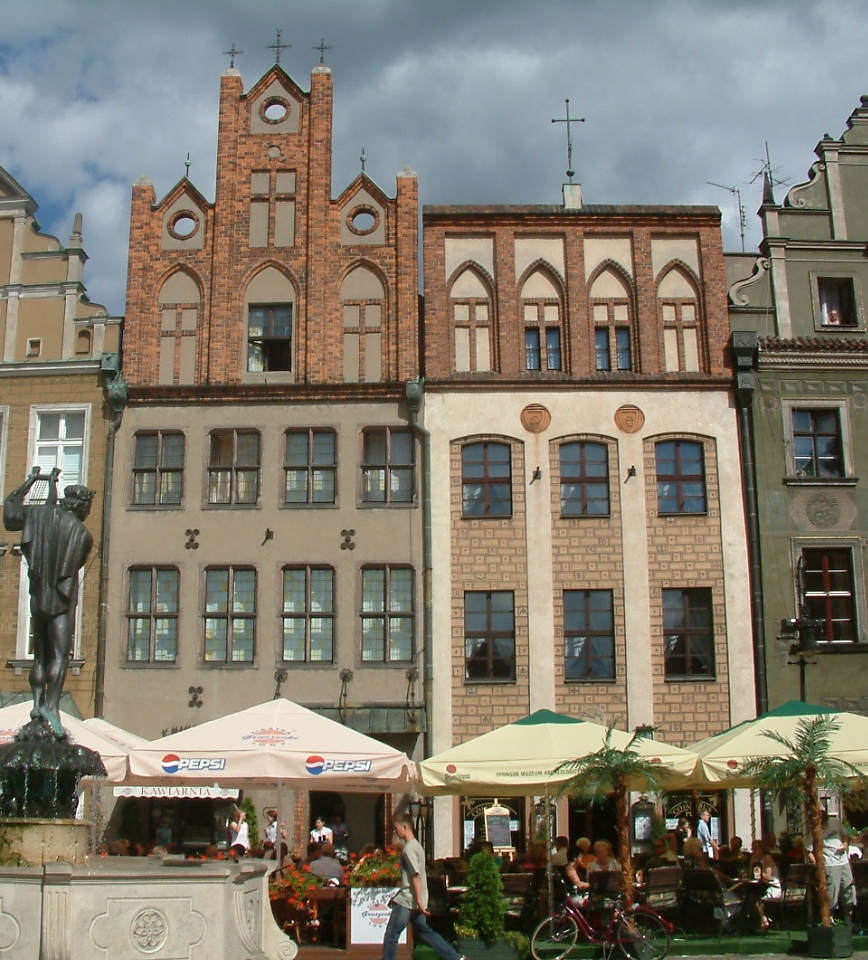
Houses in Old Market, Poznań

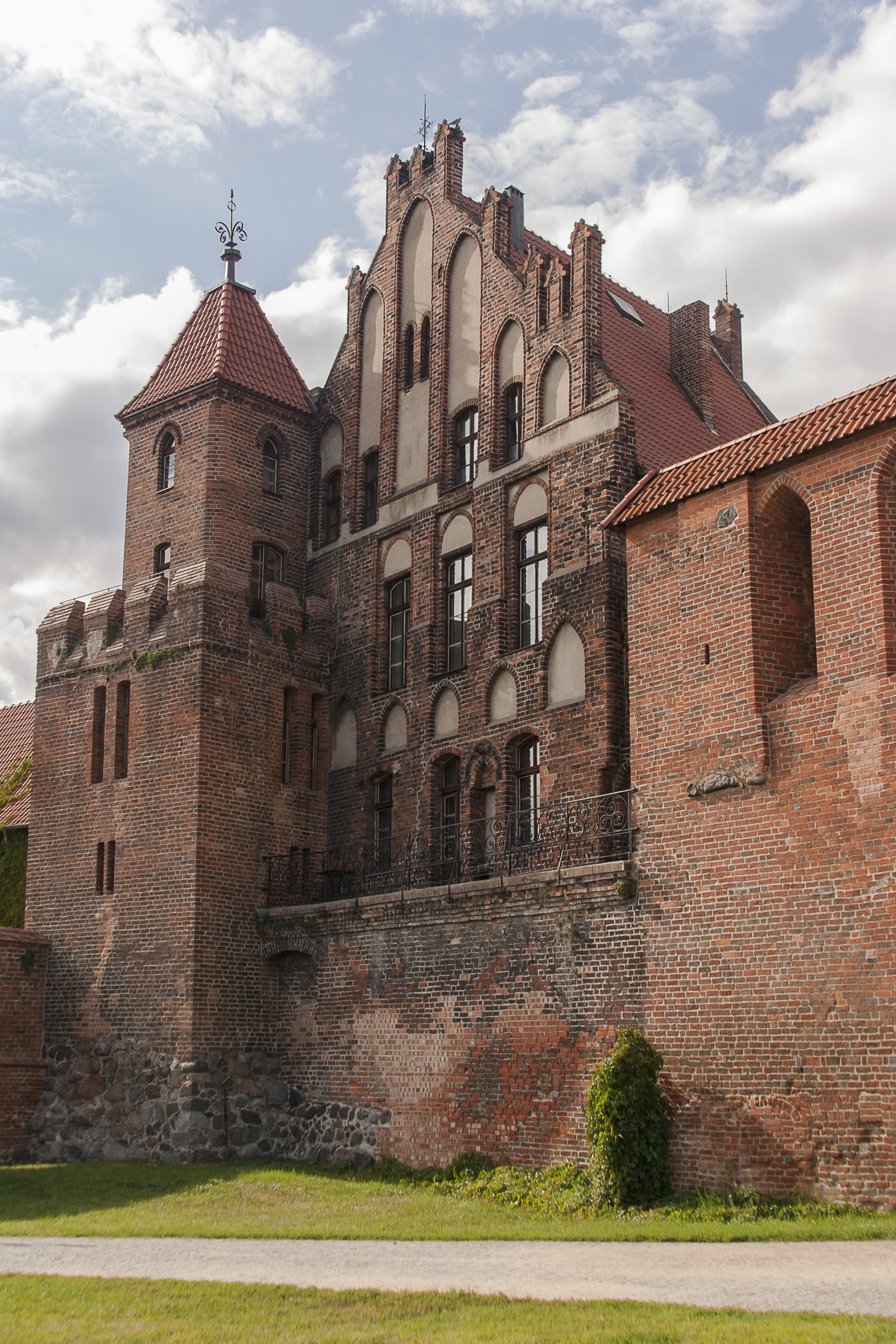
St. George Guildhall in Toruń

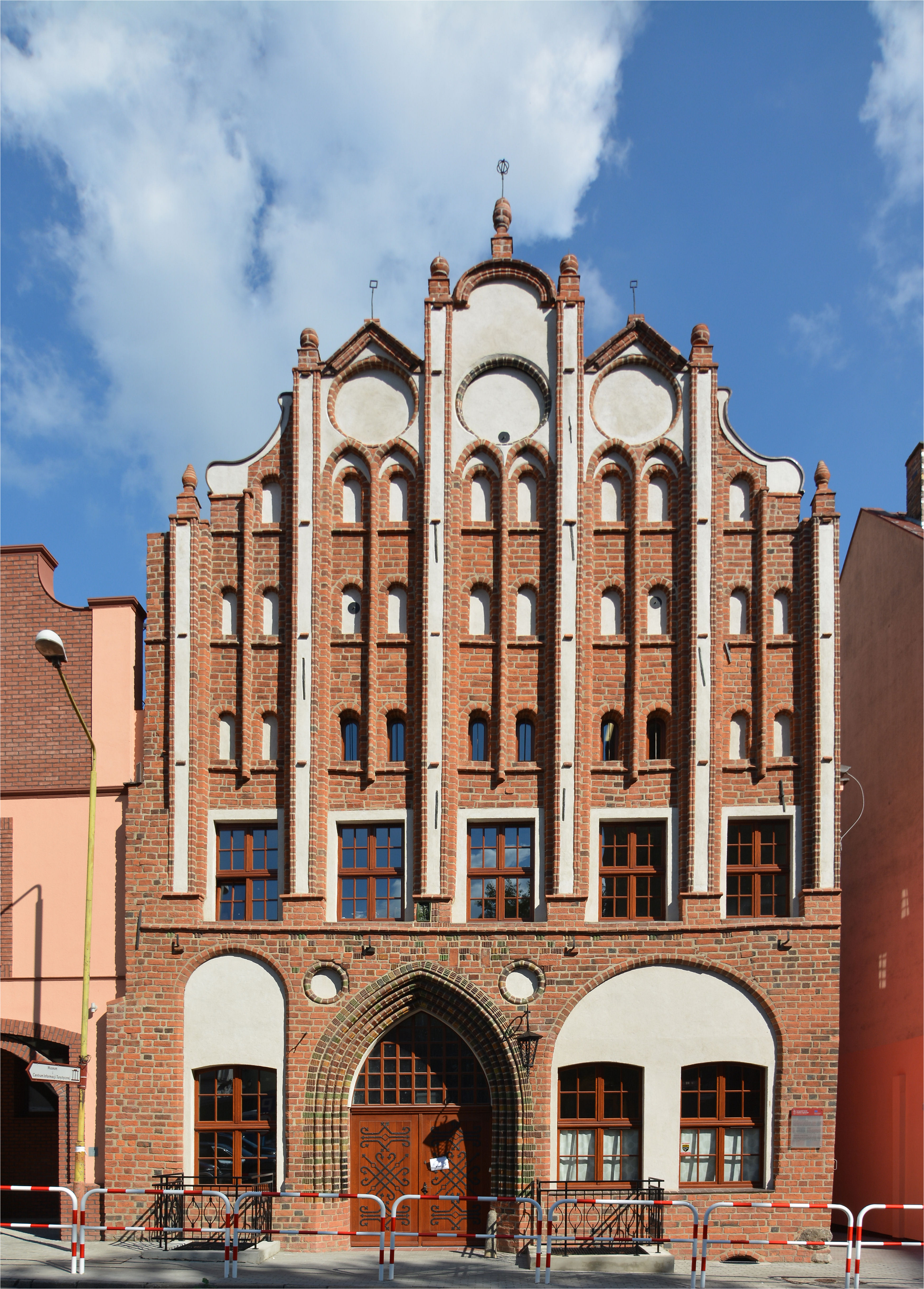
Protzen House, Stargard

== Town walls and town gates ==
The city walls surrounded, sometimes in place of the earlier shafts and such investment is carried out for many years, making frequent upgrades. Older consolidation often was increased. The sequence is often interrupted by walls tower. Cities sometimes receive a new, second belt walls (e.g., Wrocław, Toruń). Leading to the ornate gates of cities often preceded the late Gothic period barbakanami connected with them neck. First this form of defense on Polish soil was established in Toruń – Barbican Starotoruński of 1426, the best preserved in Poland barbican Barbican in Kraków. To this day preserved fragments of walls, of which most survived the gate, for example, in Szydłów, Sandomierz, Kraków St. Florian's Gate and the Kraków barbican. Significant parts of the walls have been preserved in Stargard, Pyrzyce, Byczyna, Toruń. In Chełmno and Paczków city walls are preserved almost in its entirety.

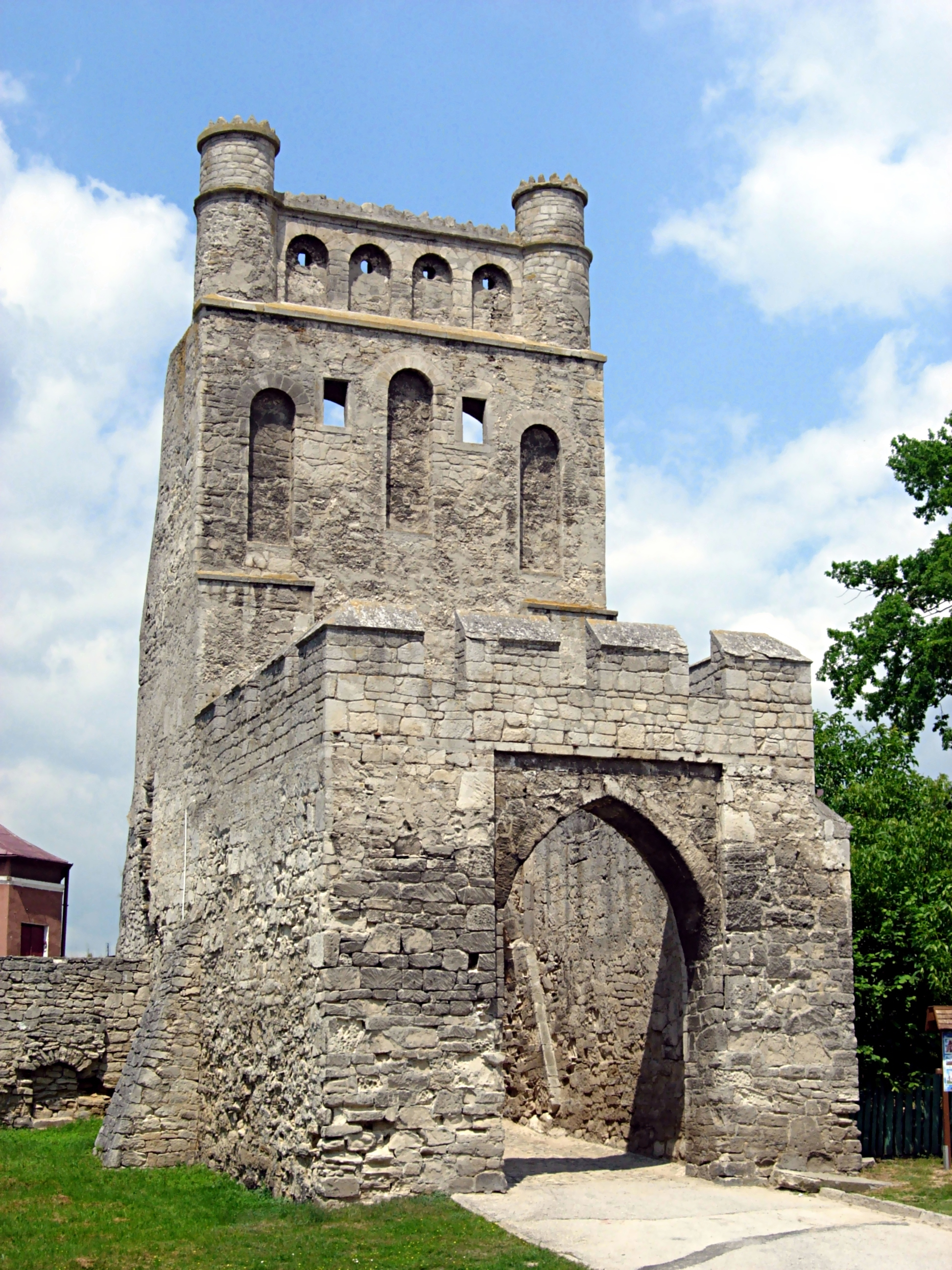
Kraków Gate, Szydłów

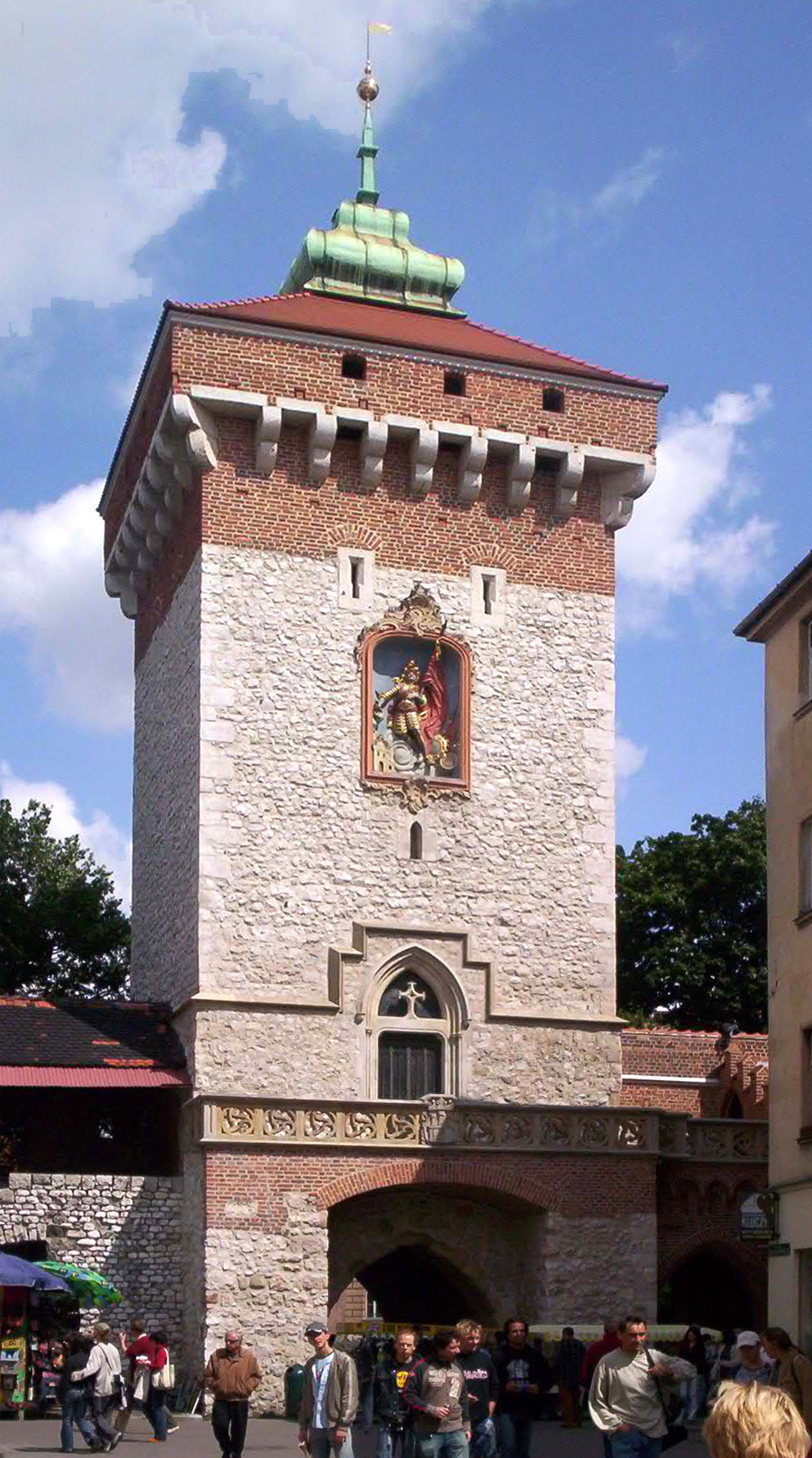
St. Florian's Gate, Kraków

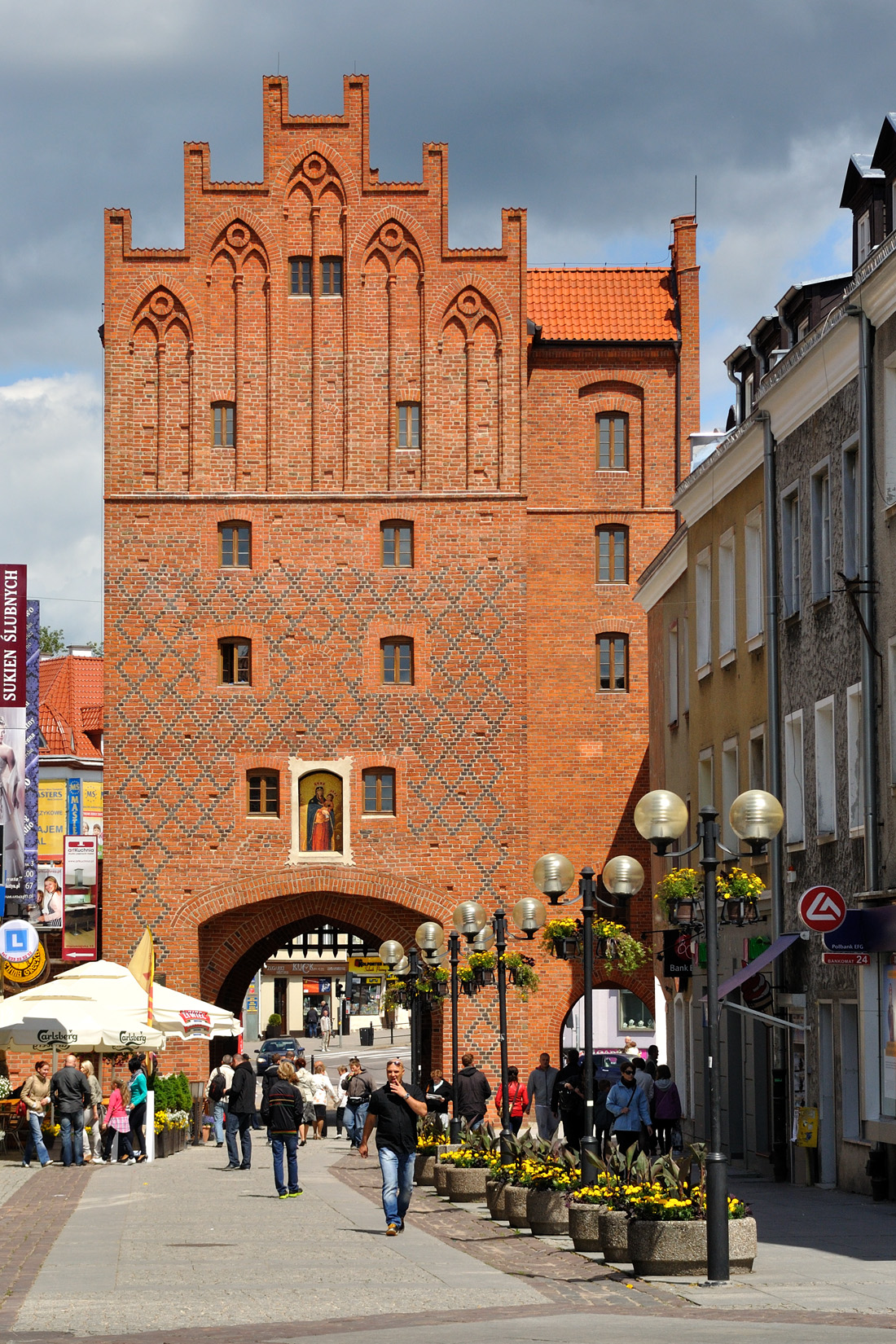
High Gate in Olsztyn

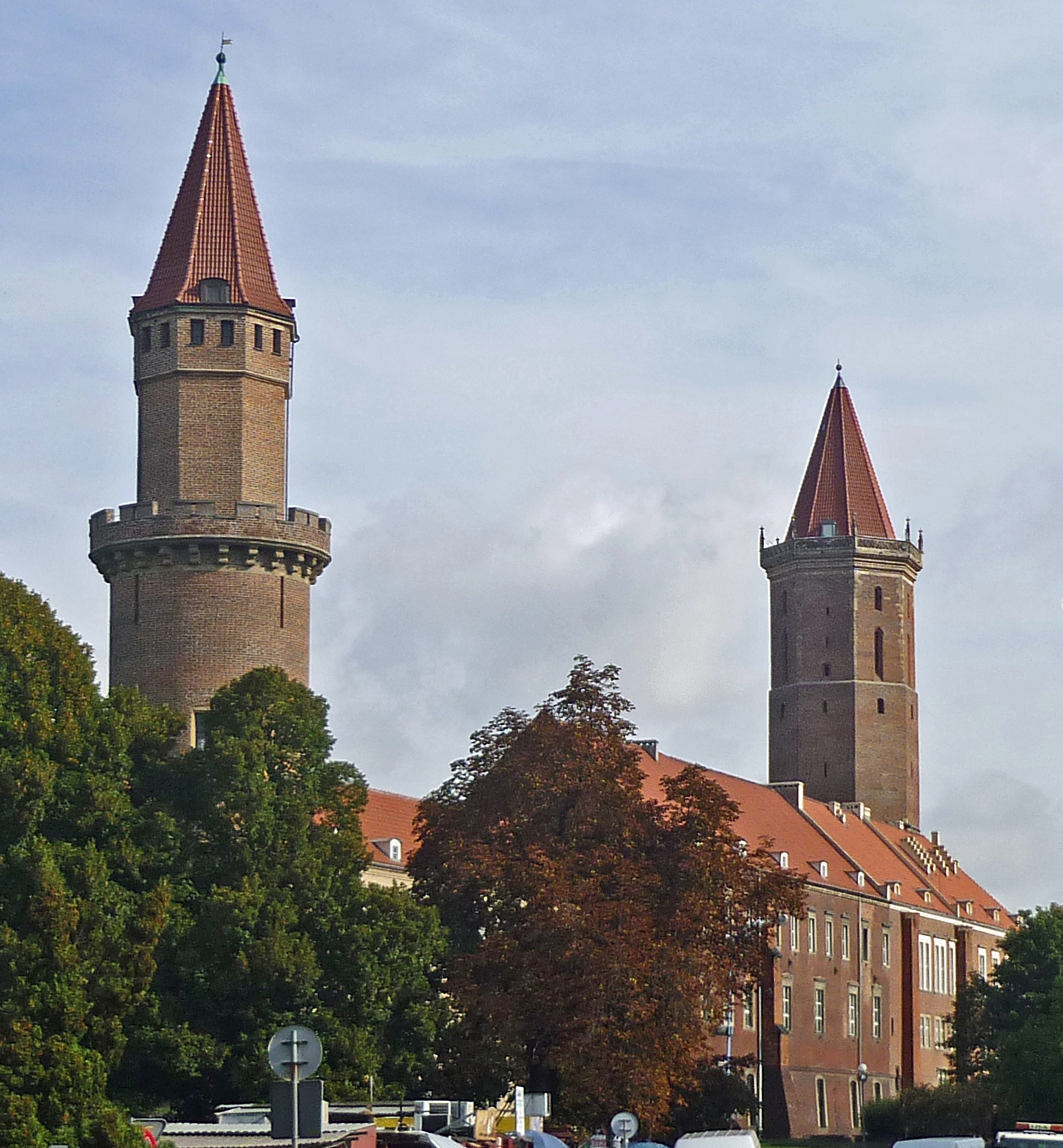
Gothic towers at Legnica Castle

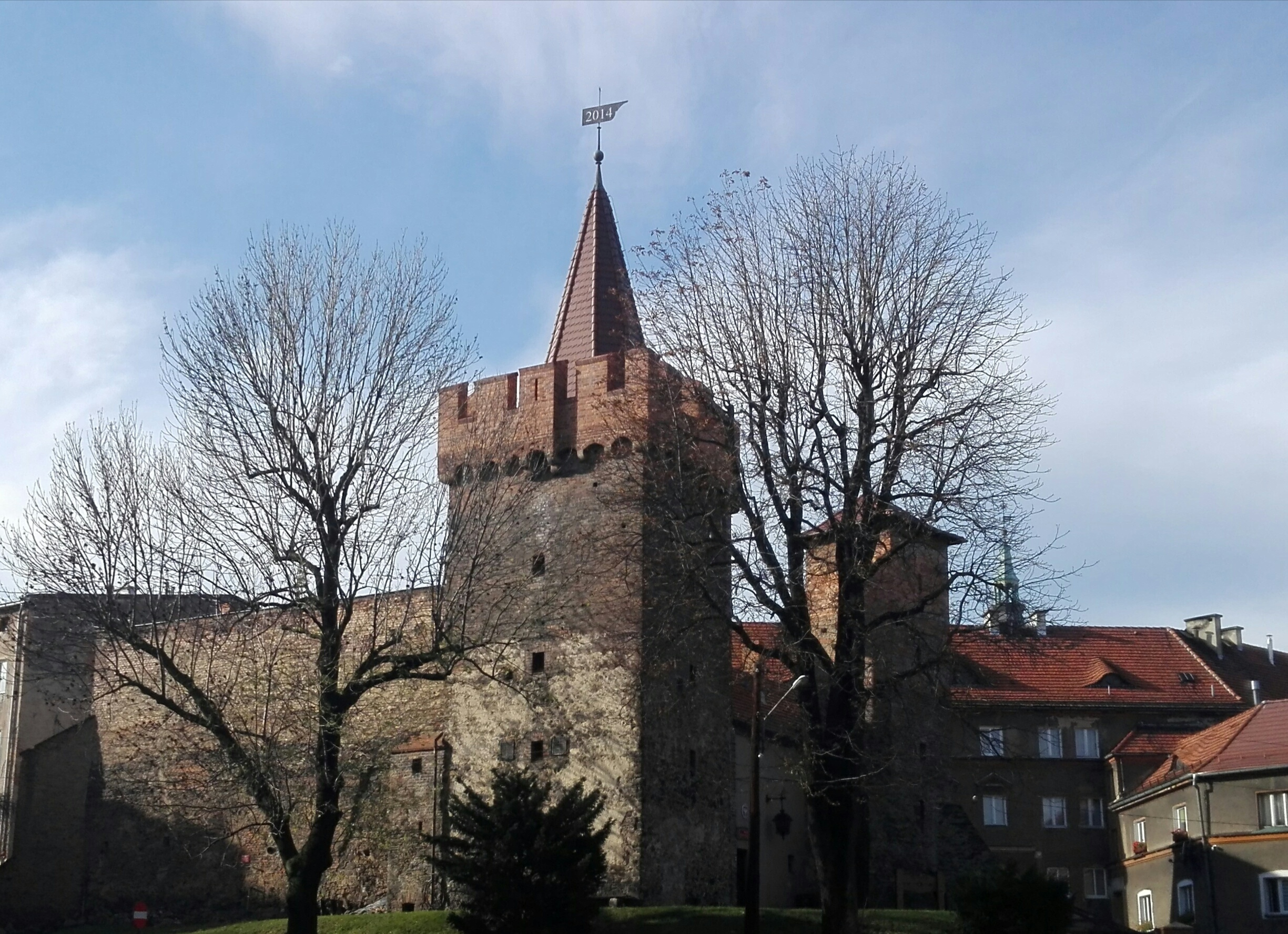
Katowska and Mała Towers with a fragment of the town wall, Prudnik

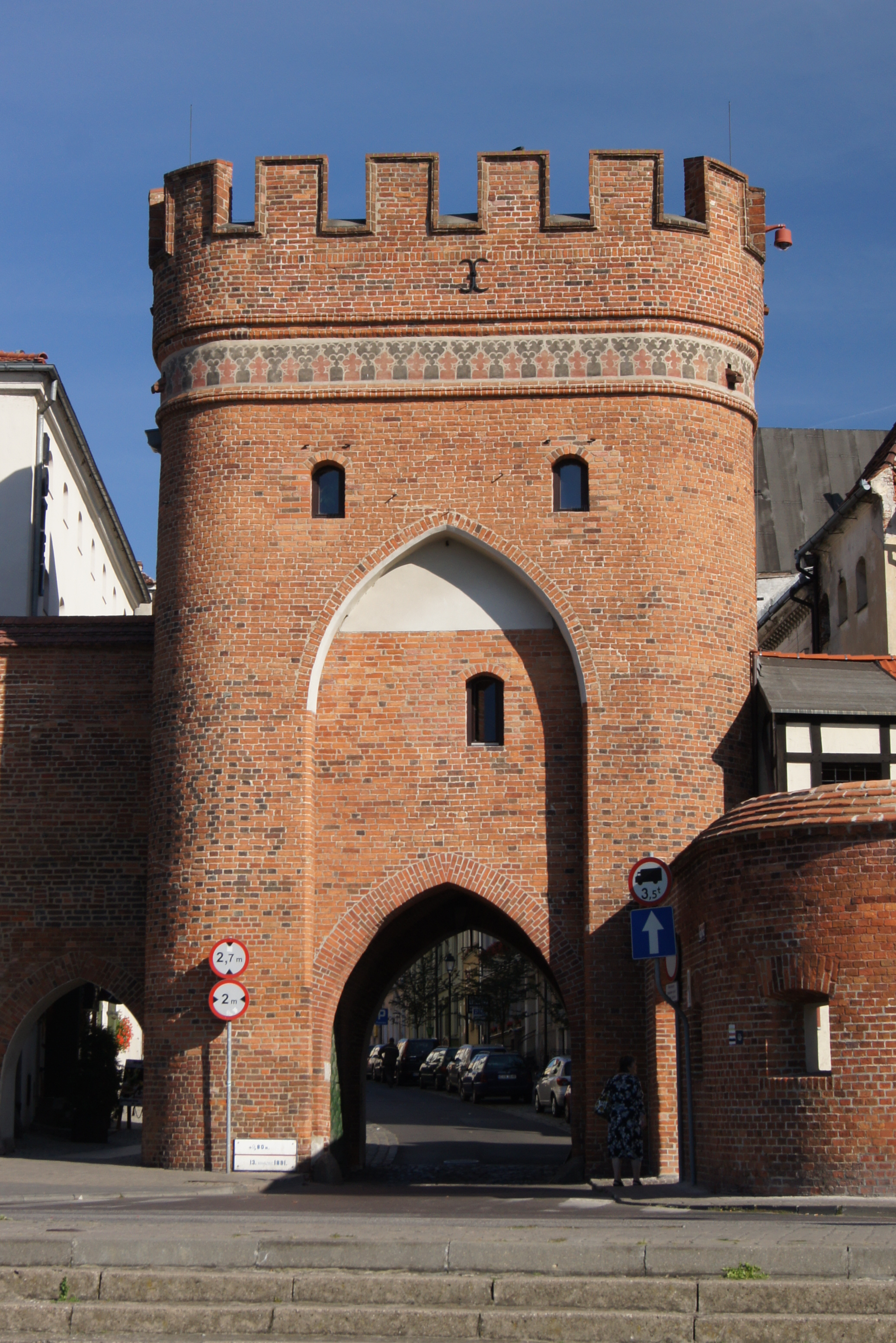
Mostowa Gate in Toruń

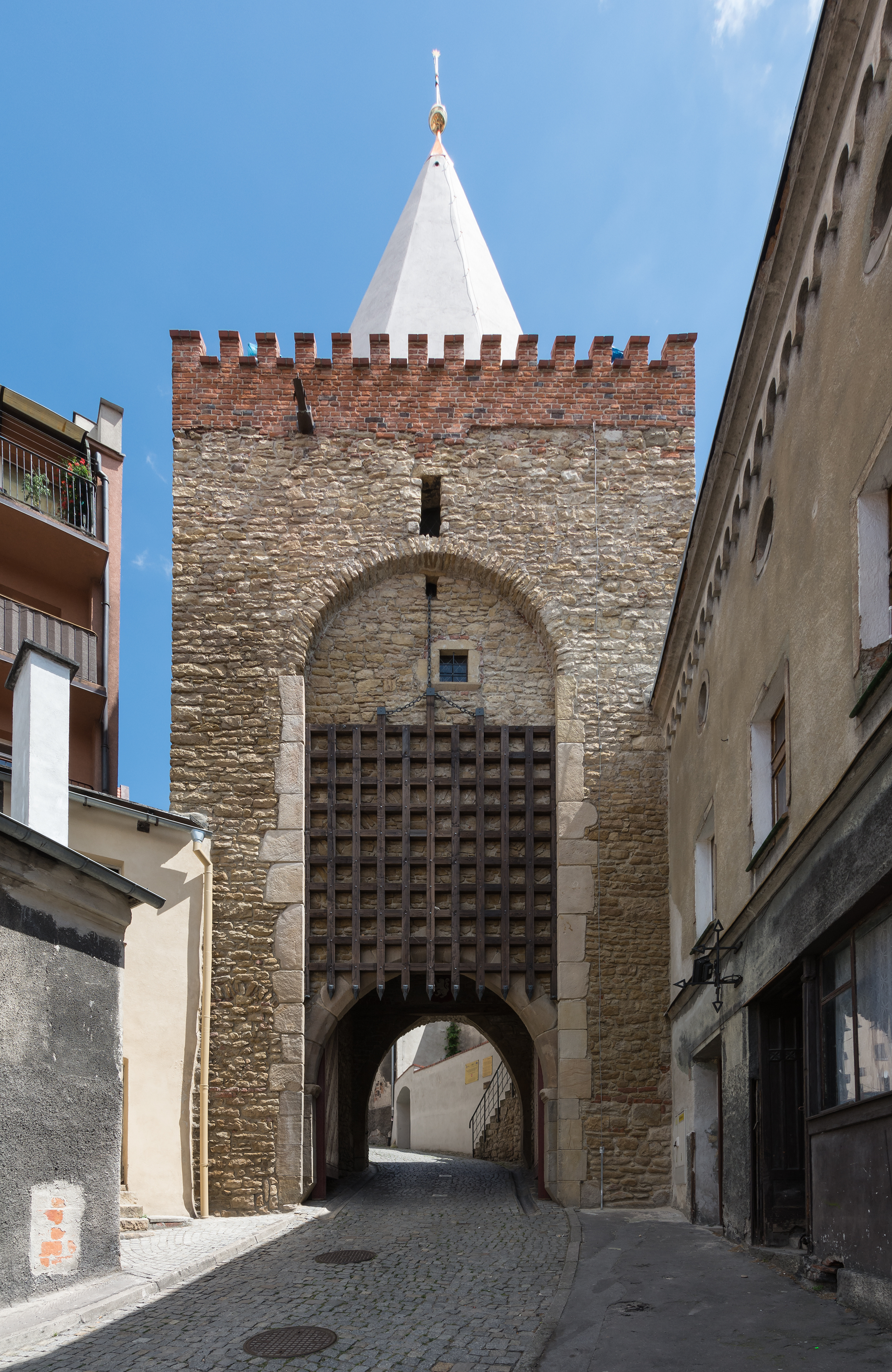
Water Tower in Bystrzyca Kłodzka

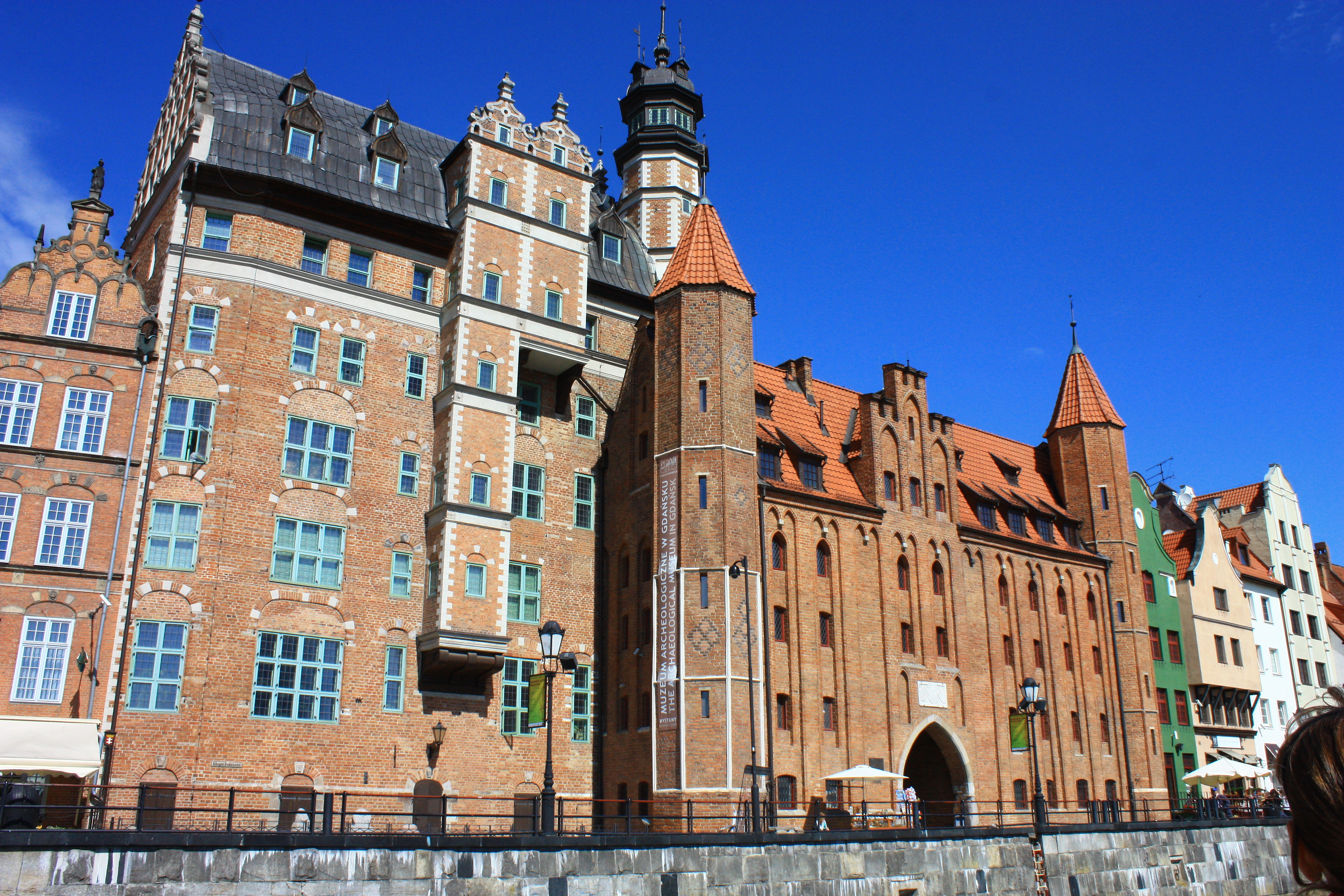
St. Mary's Gate in Gdańsk

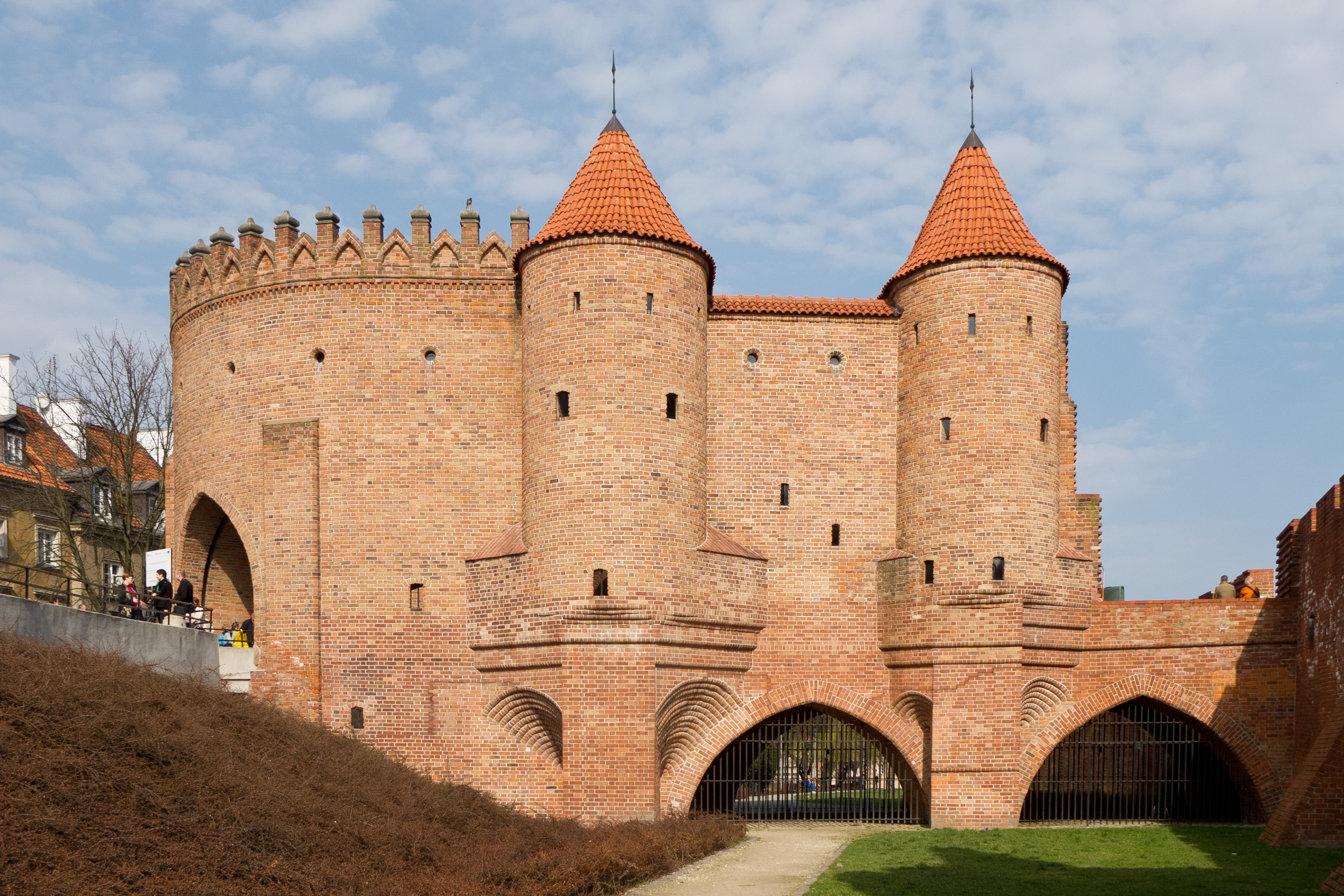
Barbican in Warsaw

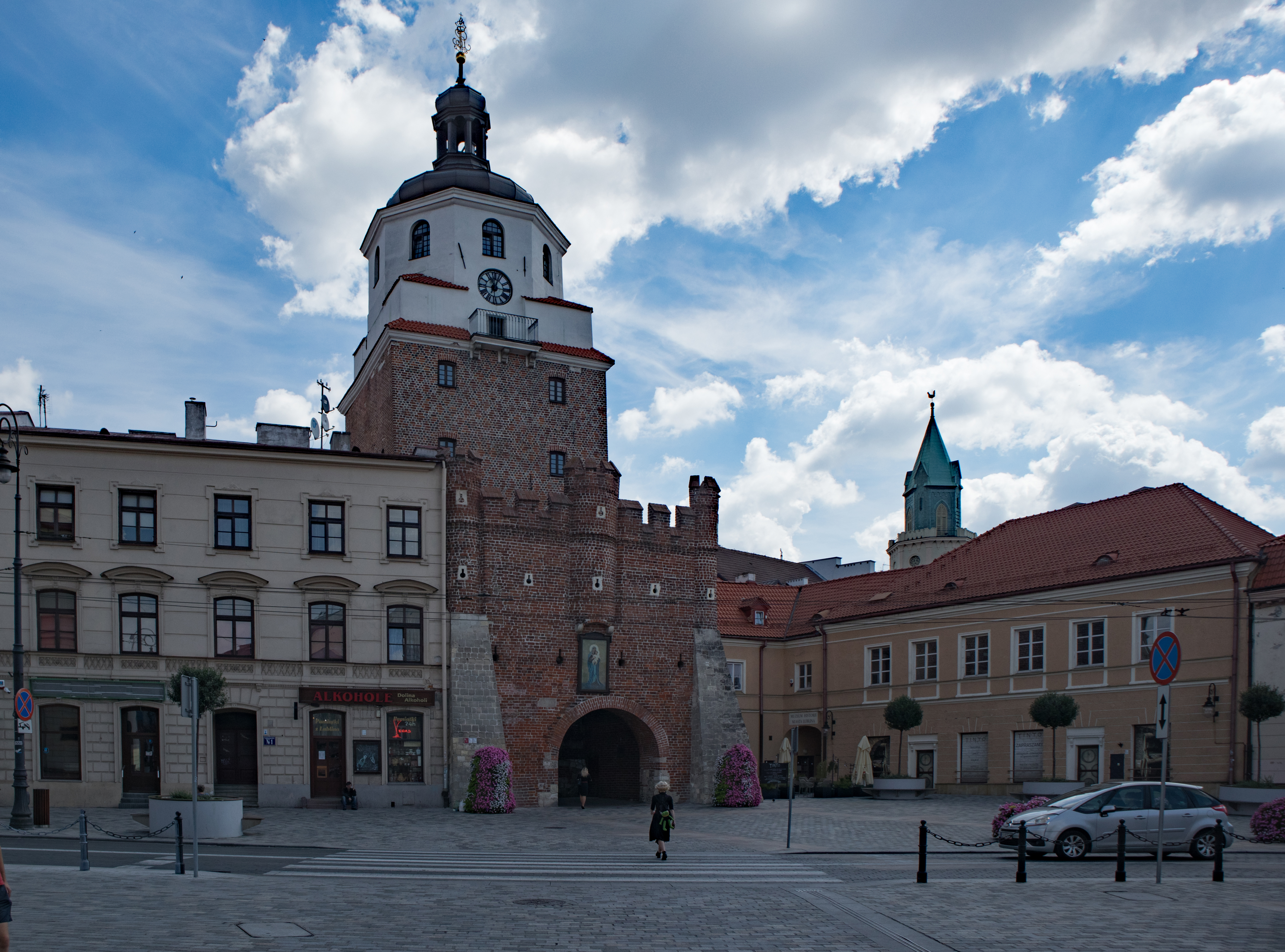
Kraków Gate in Lublin

== Churches ==
Gothic churches can be found all over Poland, especially in major cities of late medieval Poland, including Kraków, Wrocław, Gdańsk. The St. Mary's Church in Gdańsk is the largest brick church in the world. The Pelplin Cathedral in Pelplin, Pomerania is one of the largest churches in Poland. Kraków's St. Mary's Basilica and Wawel Cathedral are among the most recognisable landmarks in all of Poland.

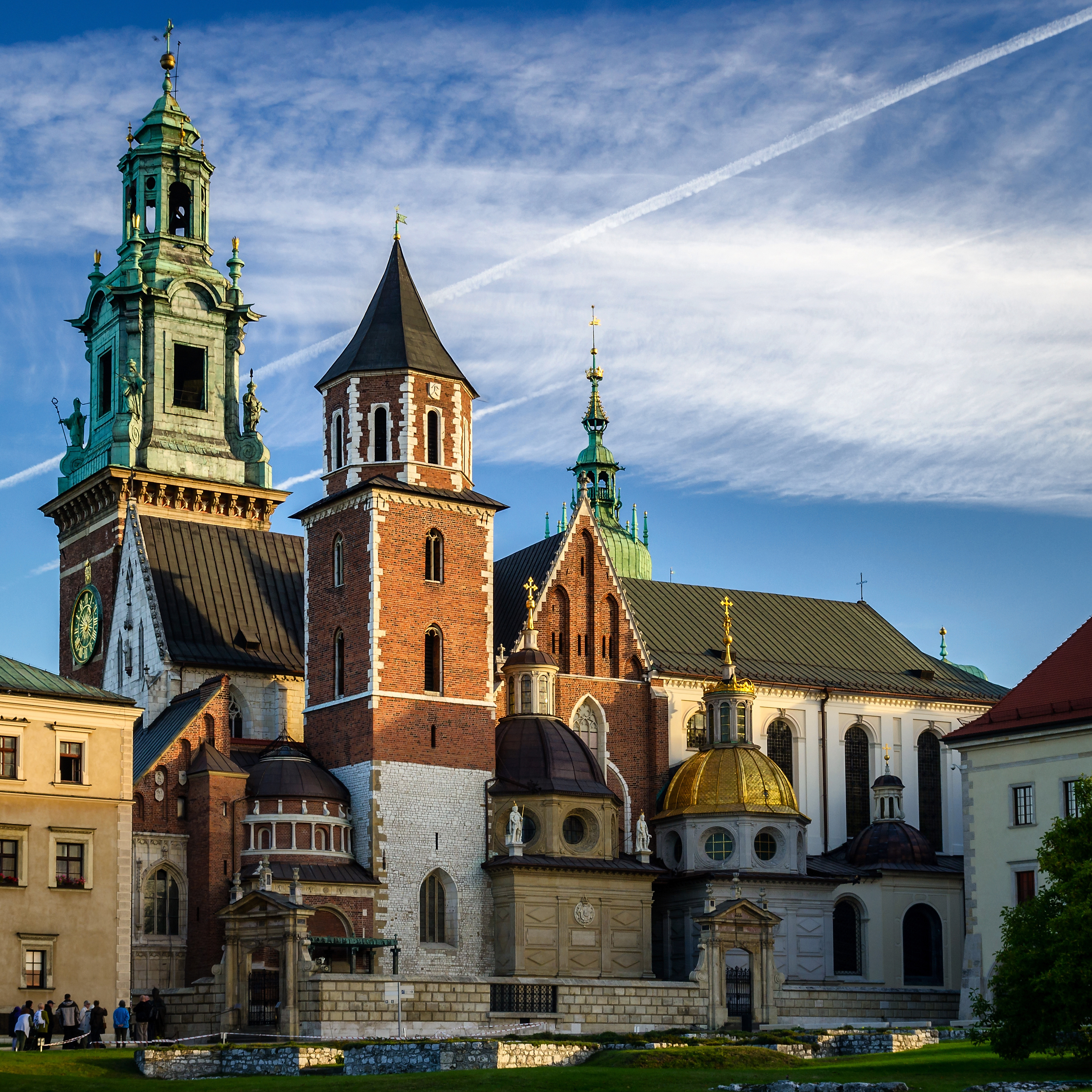
Wawel Cathedral in Kraków

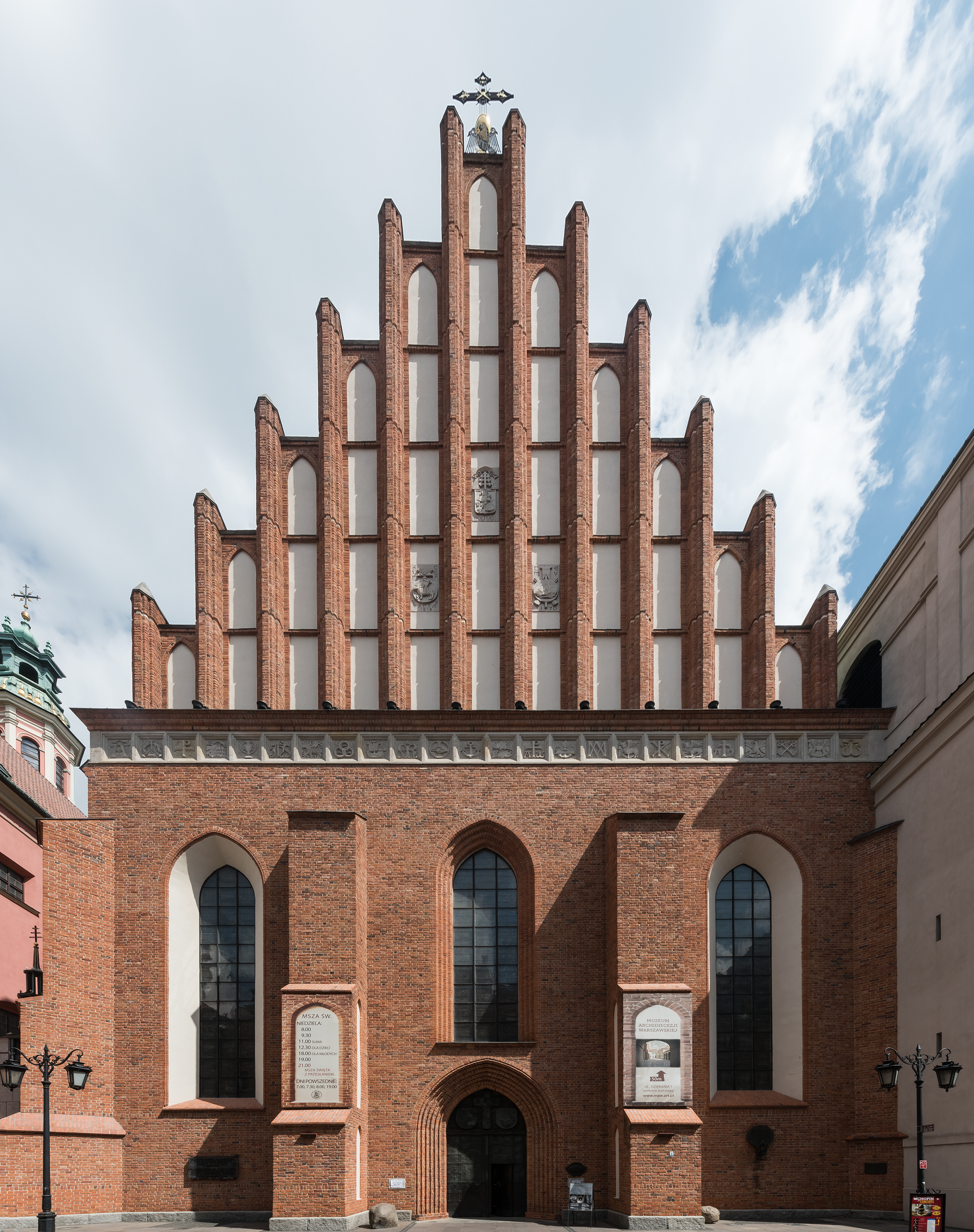
St. John's Cathedral in Warsaw

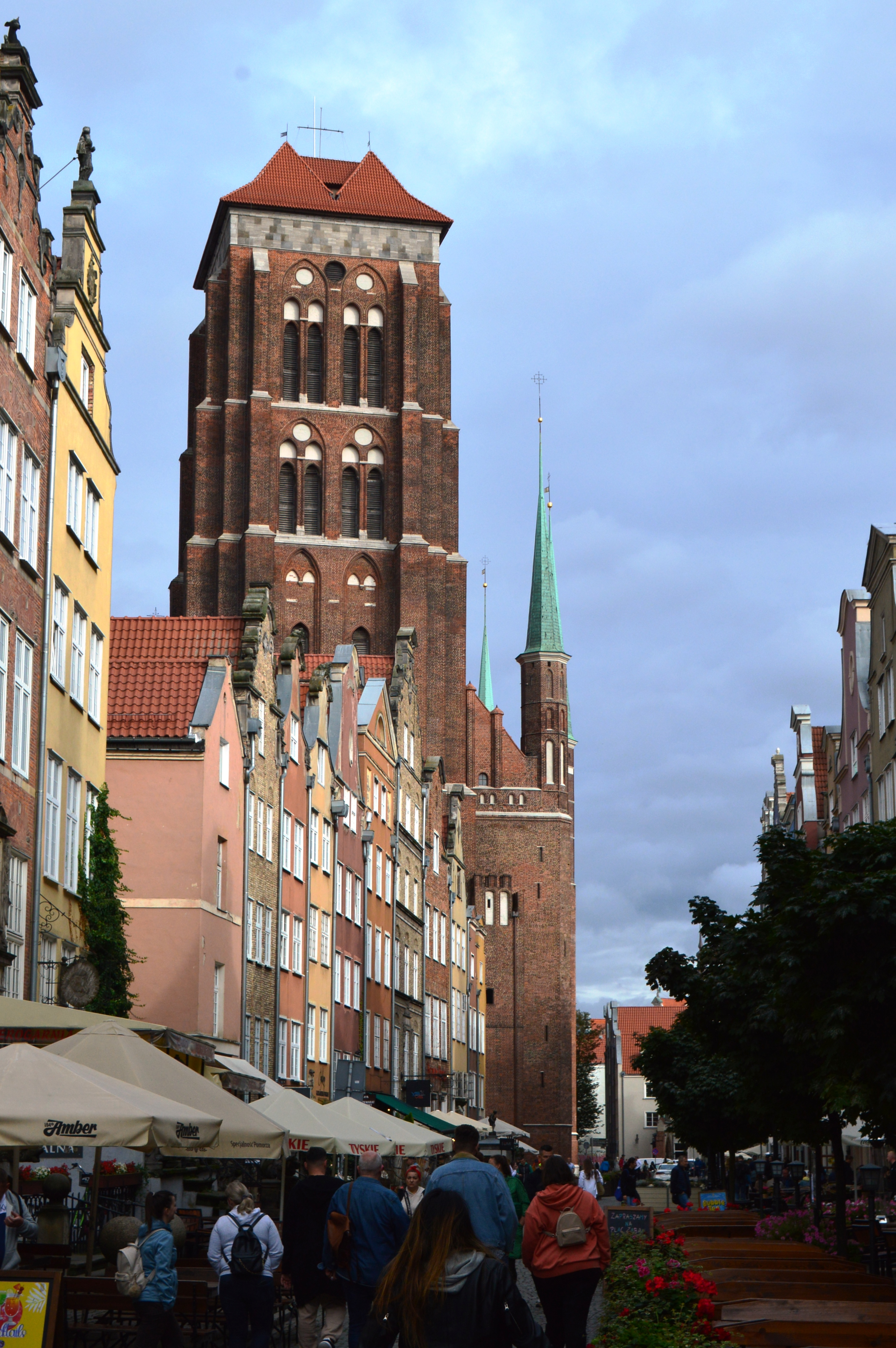
St. Mary's Church, Gdańsk

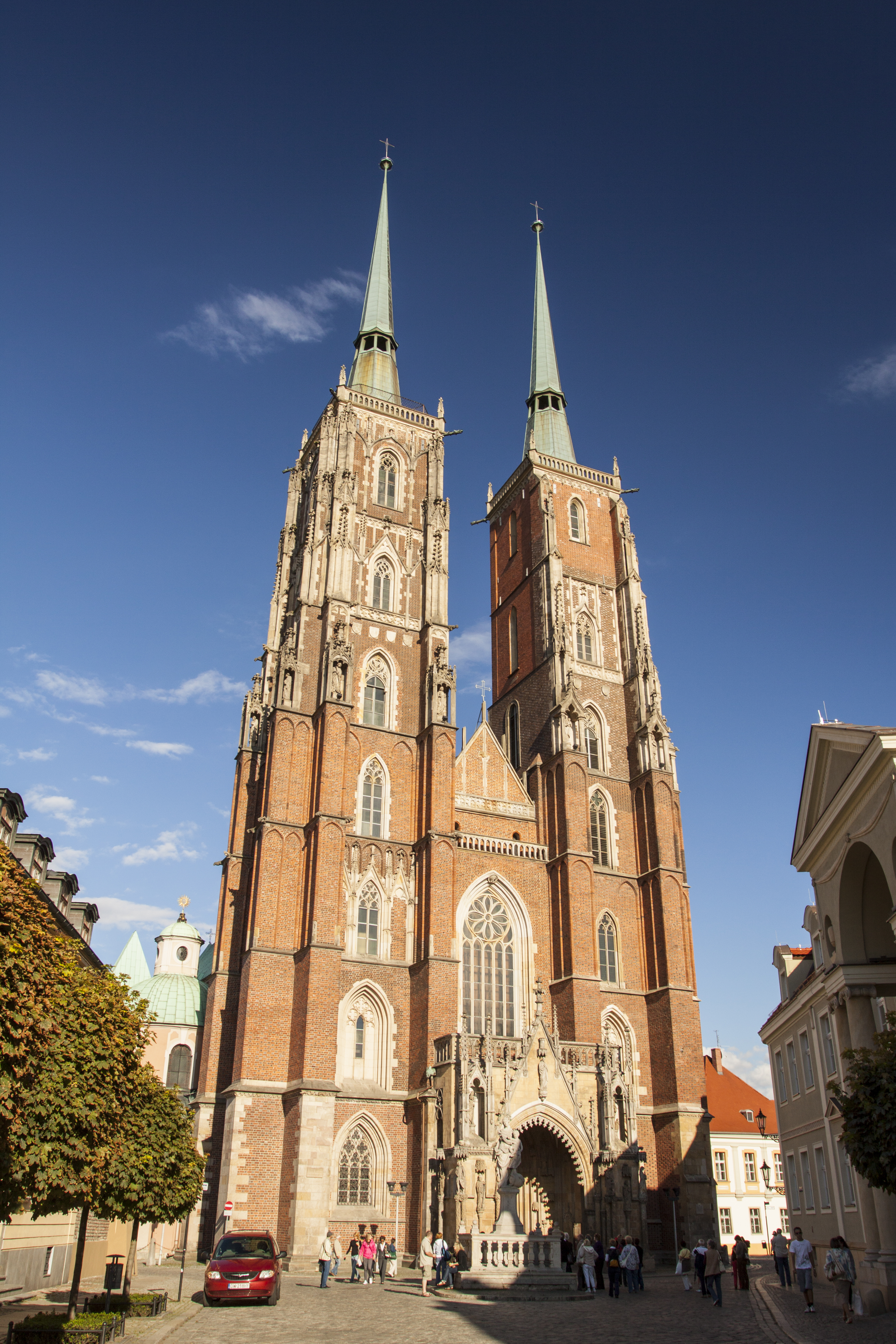
Wrocław Cathedral

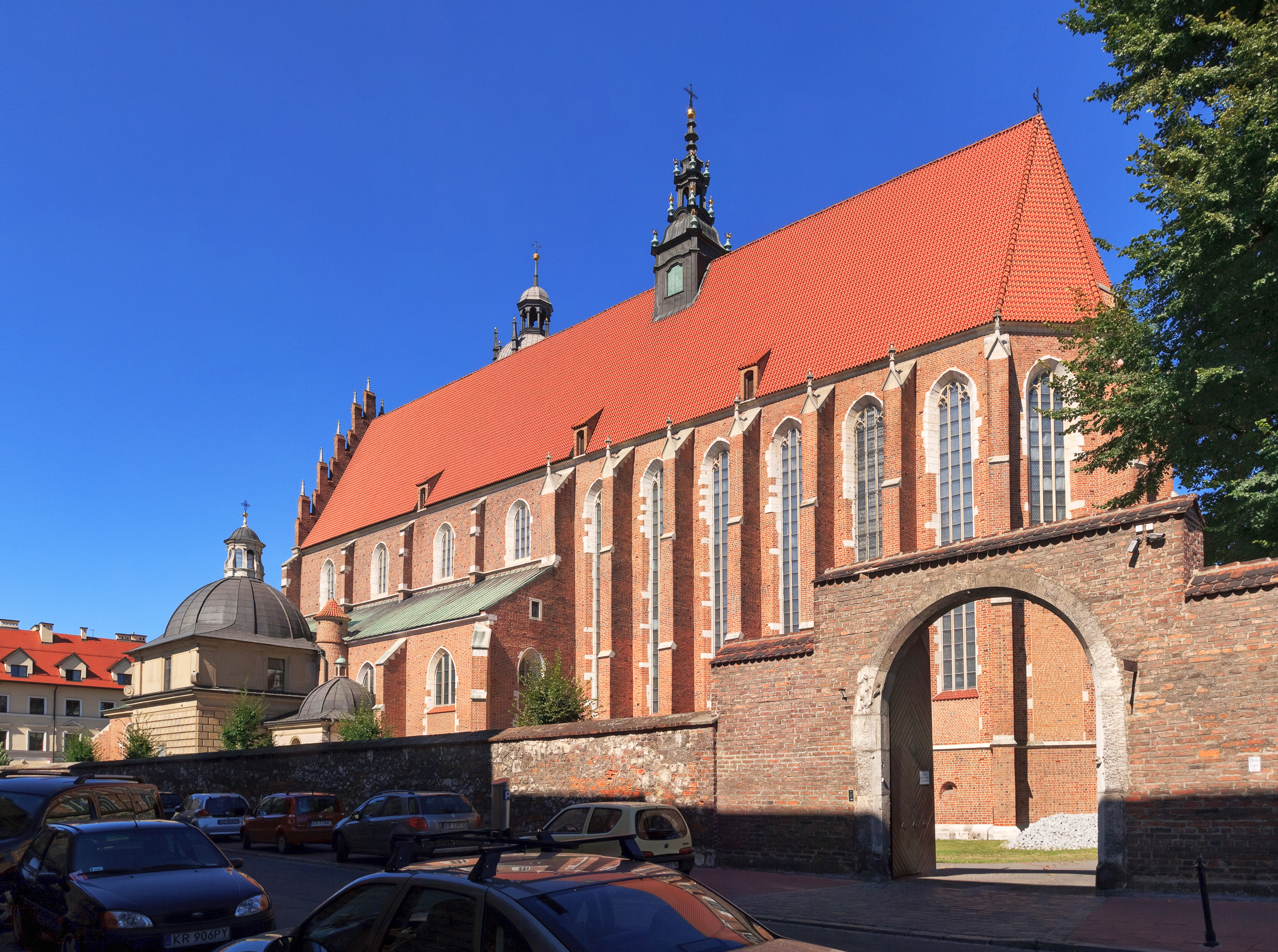
Corpus Christi Basilica in Kraków

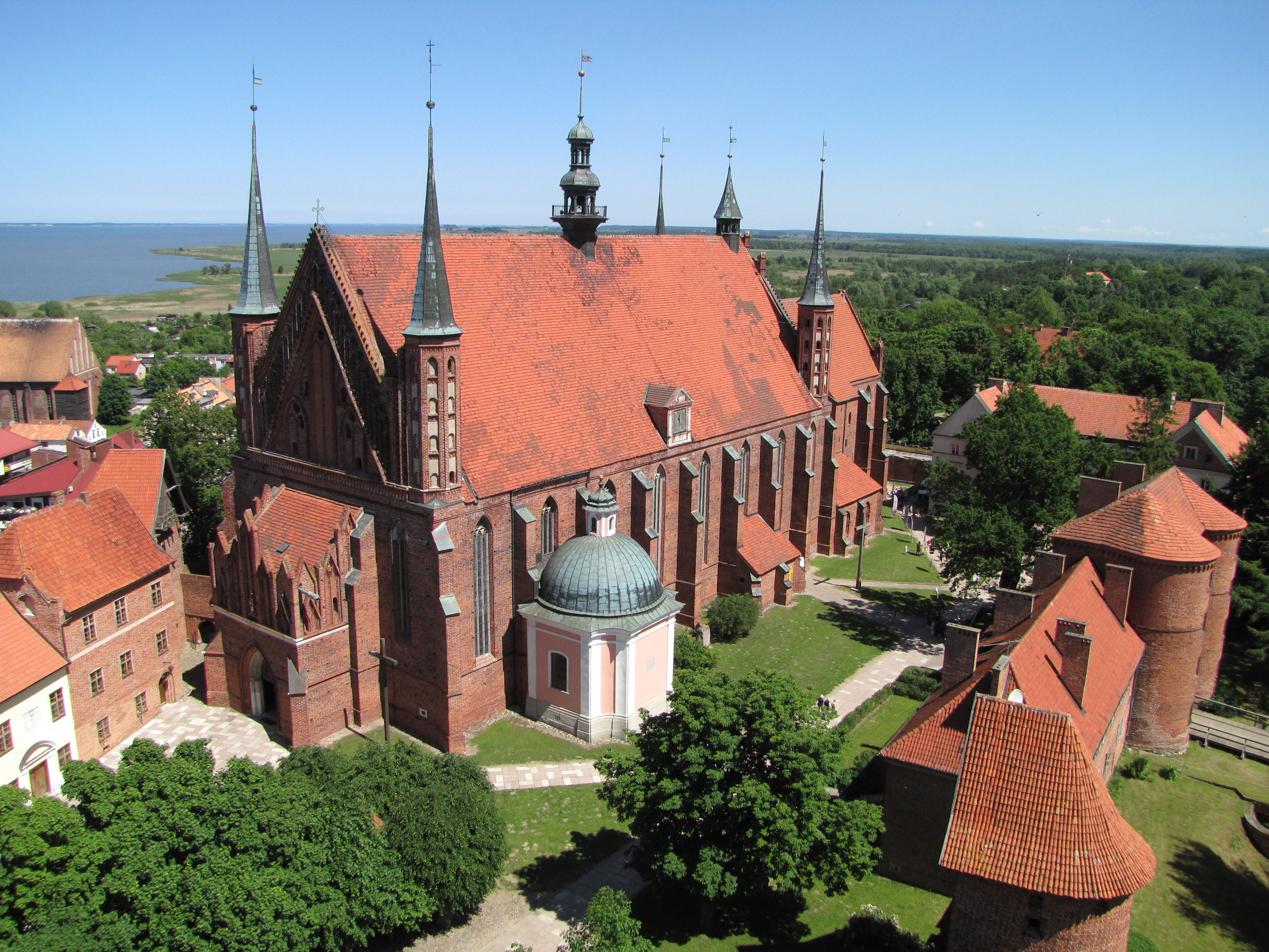
Frombork Cathedral

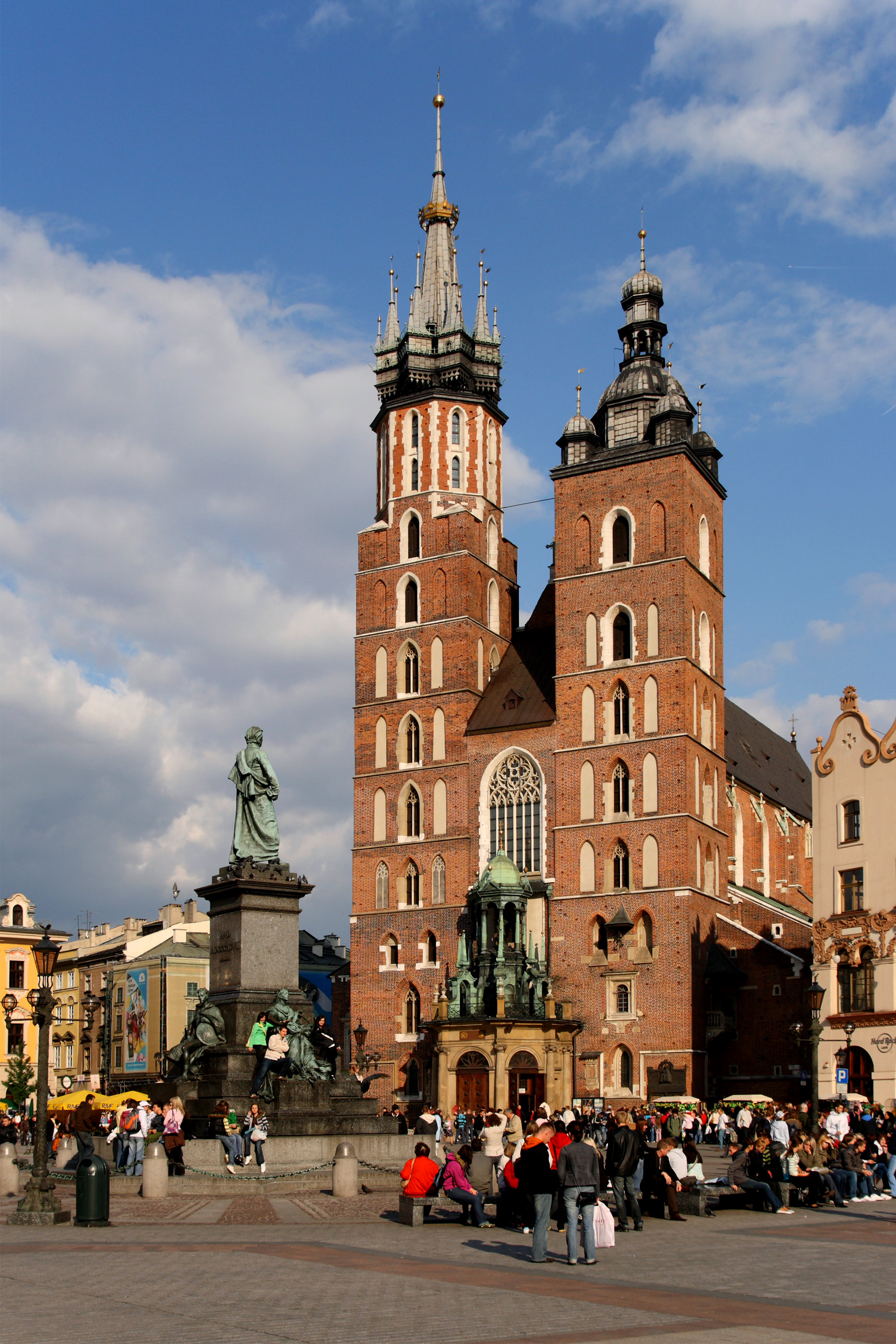
St. Mary's Basilica, Kraków

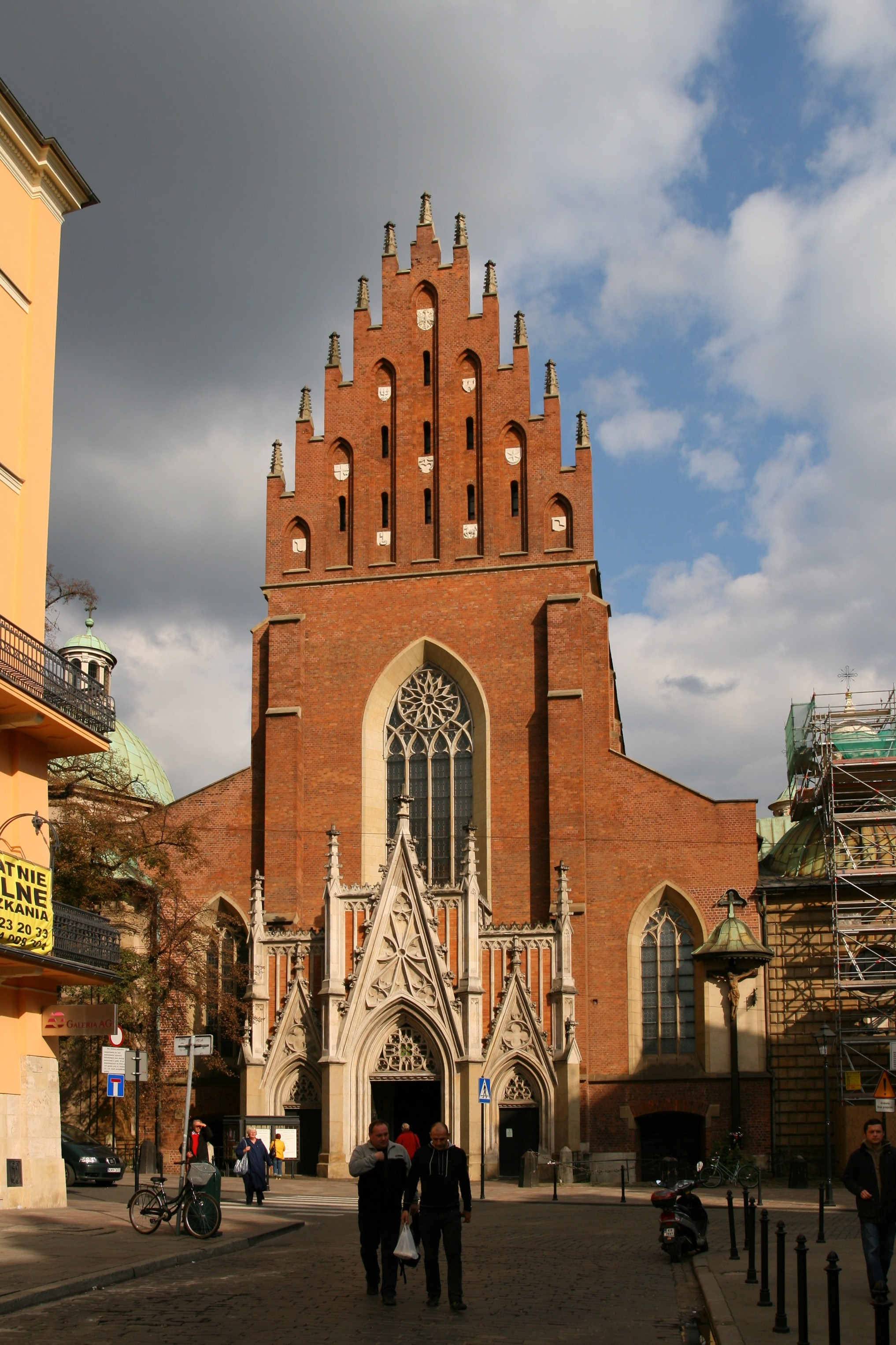
Dominicans Church, Kraków

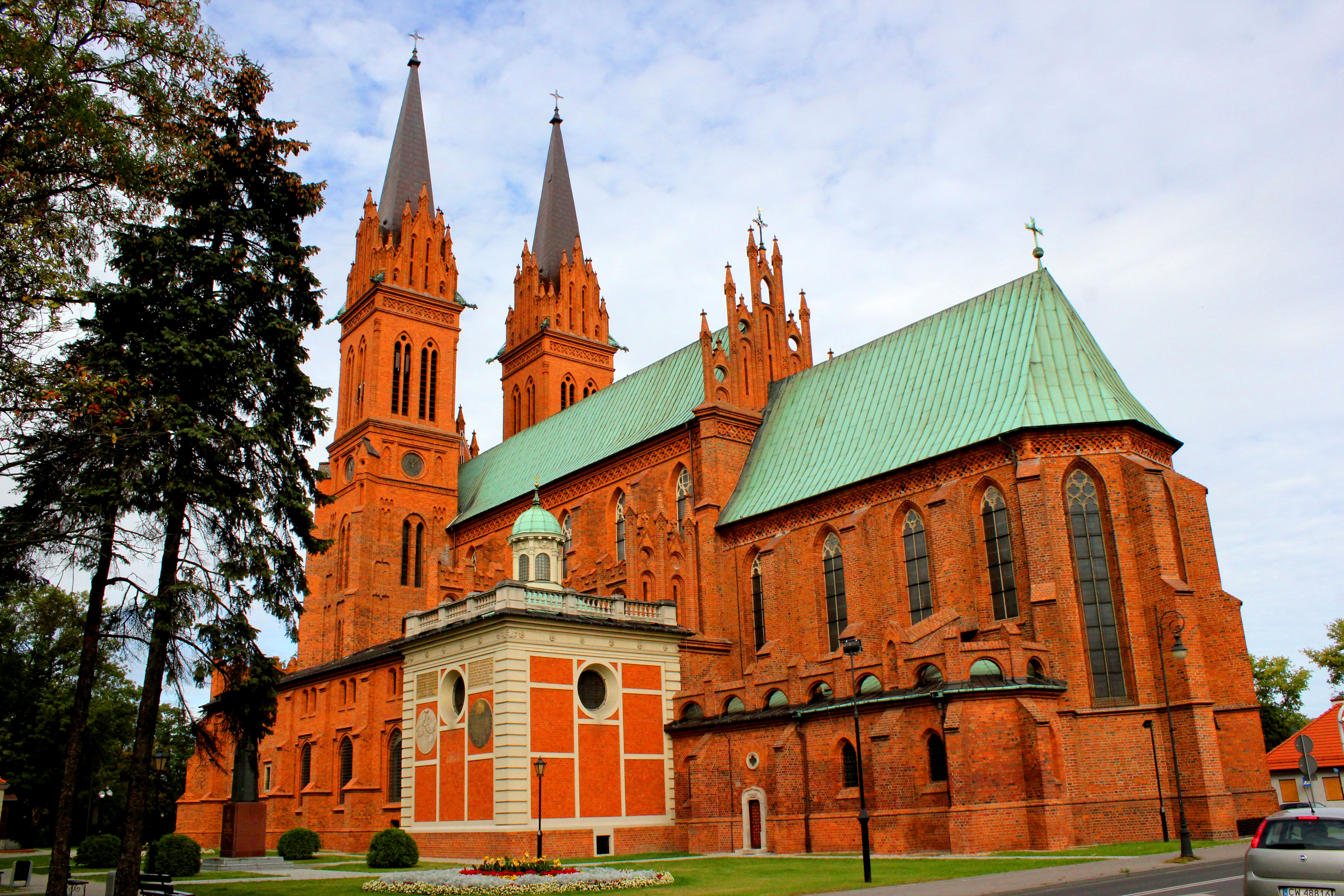
Cathedral Church in Włocławek

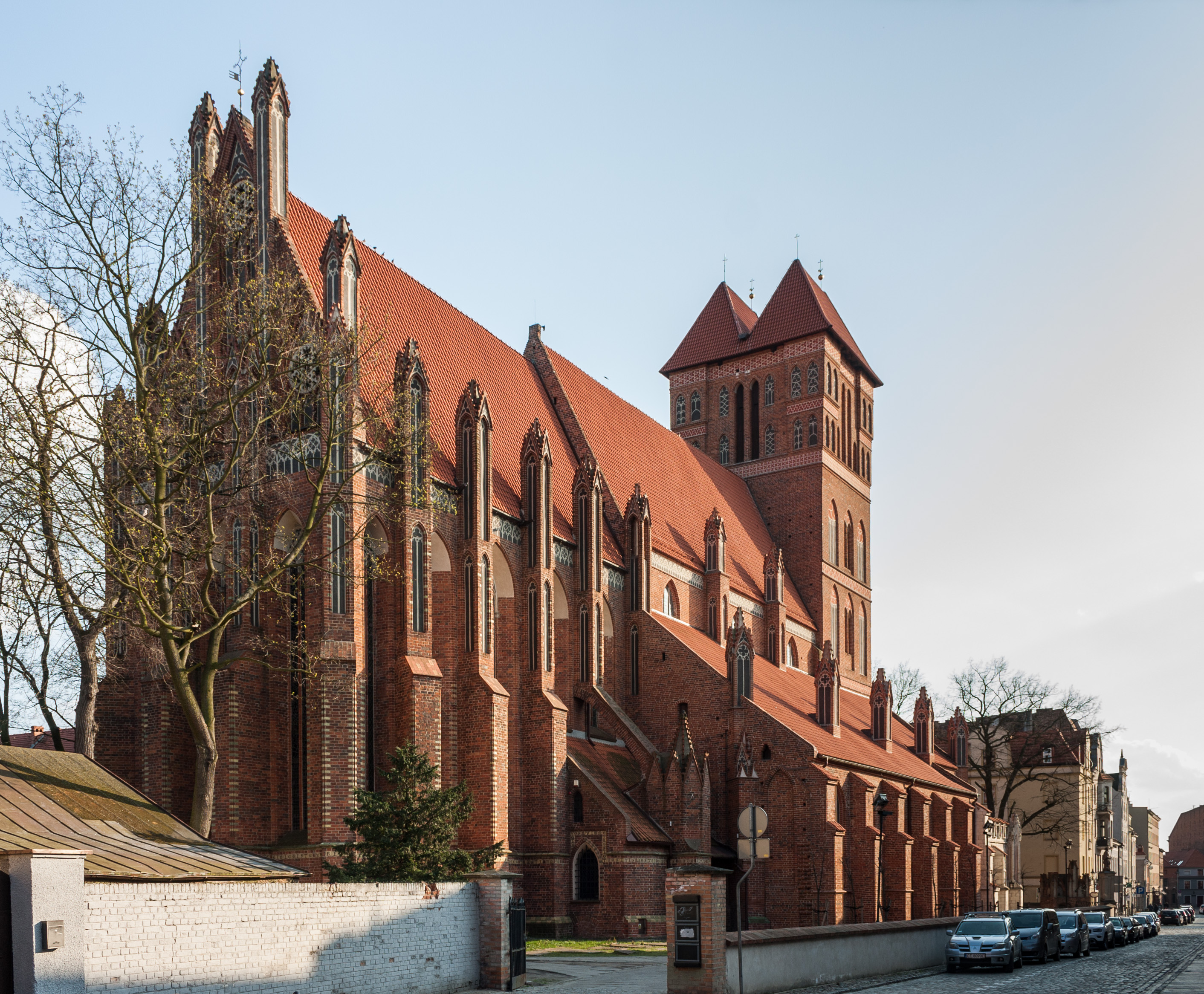
St. Jacob Church, Toruń

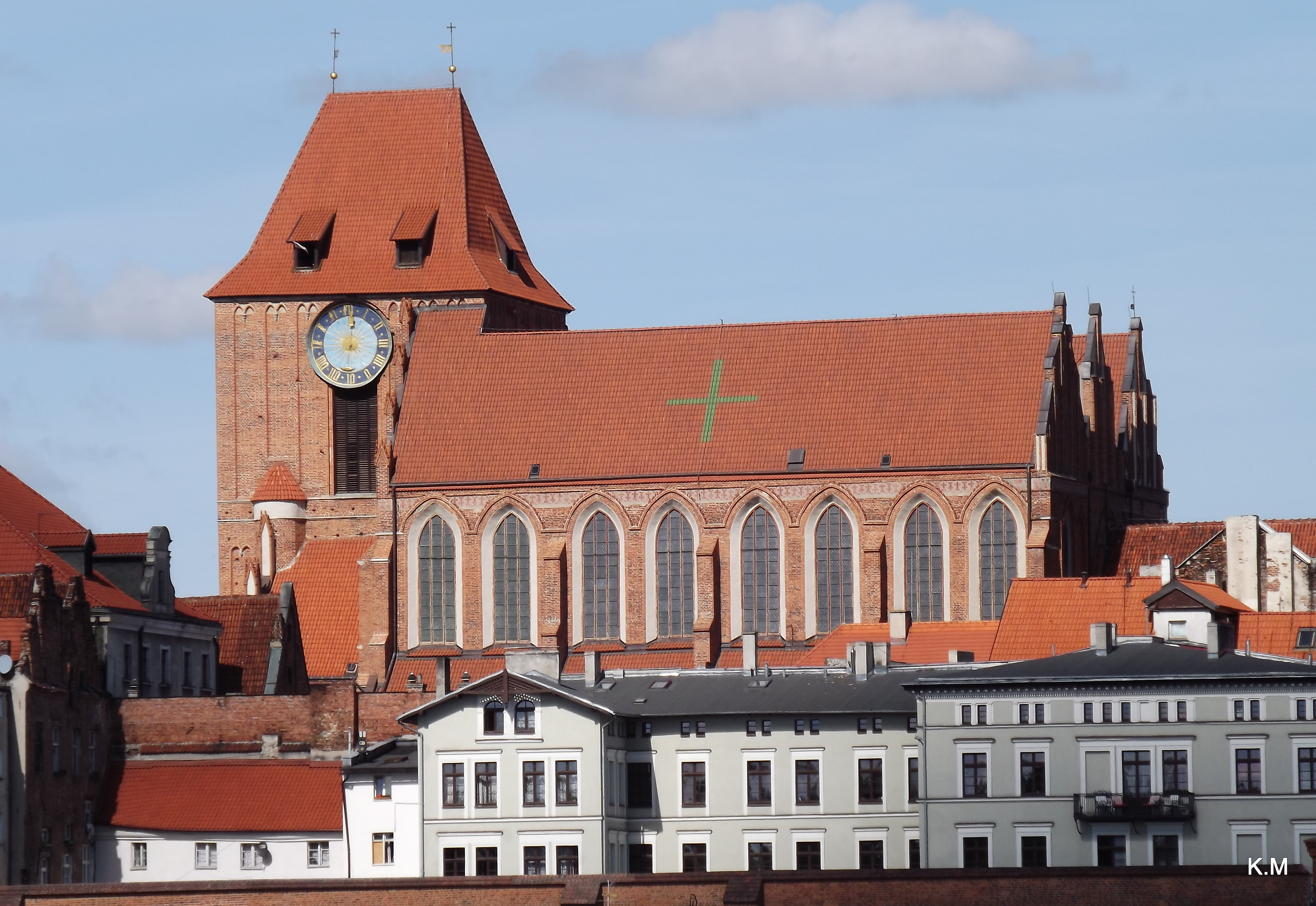
Cathedral, Toruń

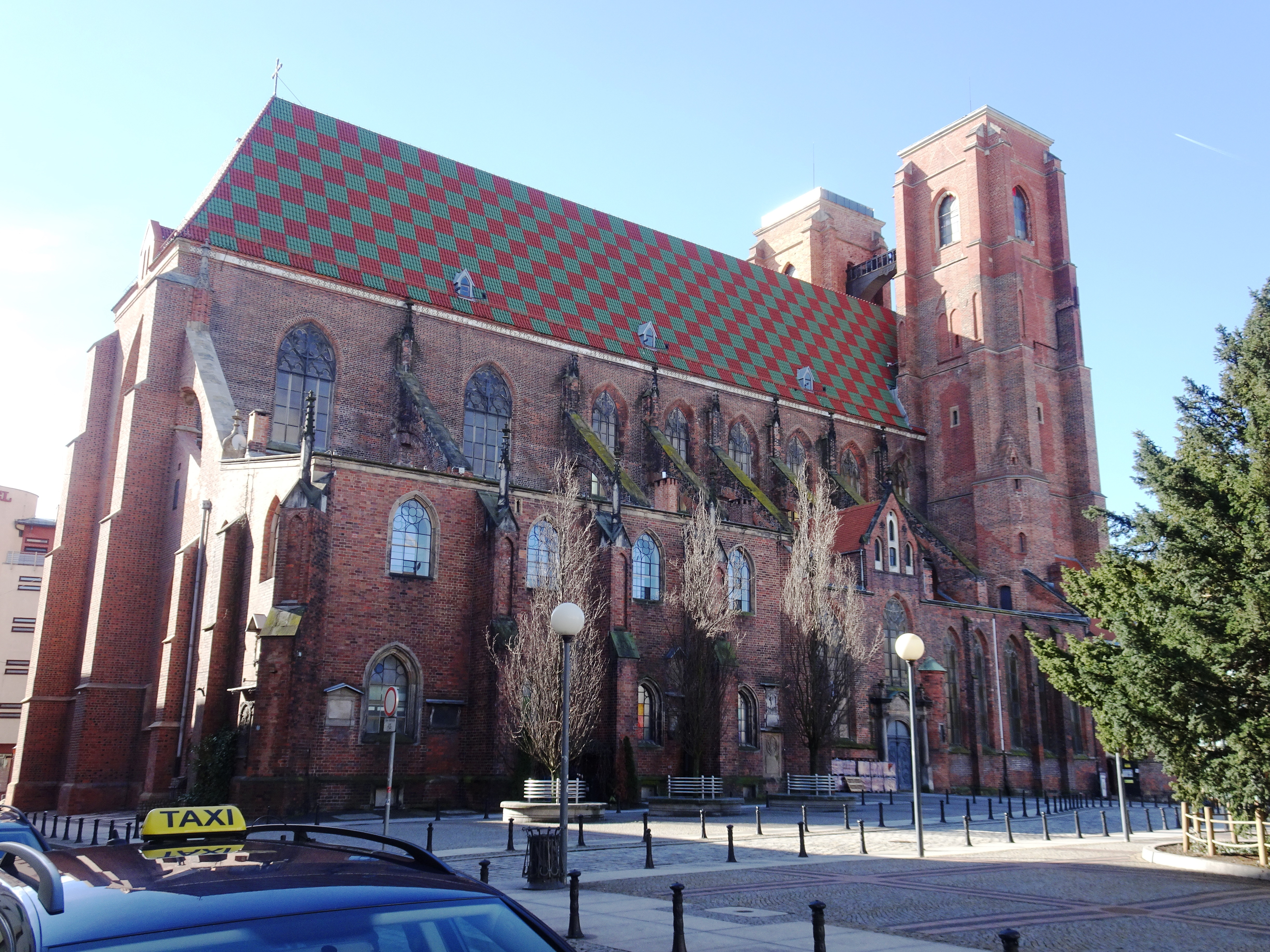
St. Mary Magdalene Church, Wrocław

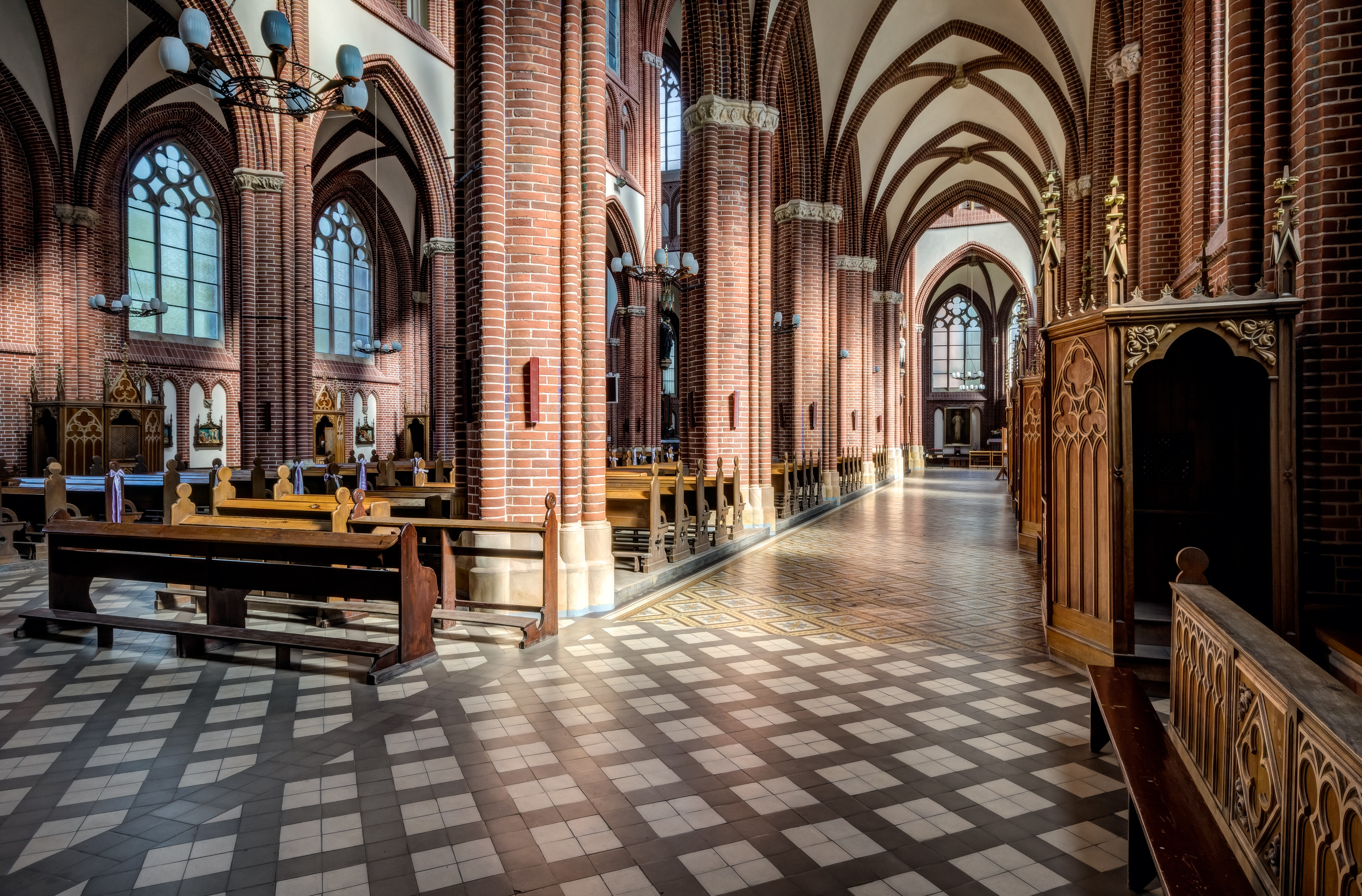
St. Michael Archangel Church, Wrocław

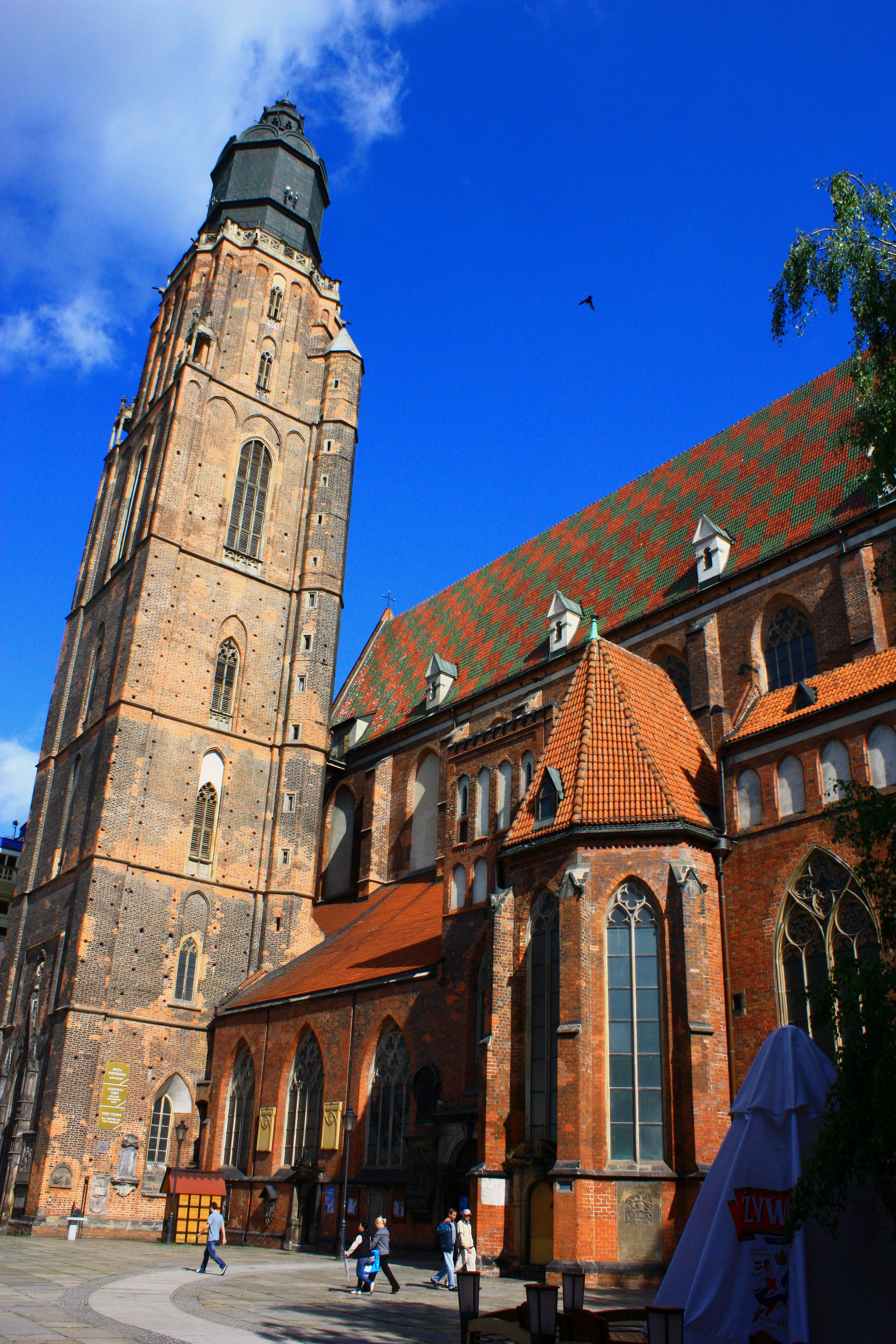
St. Elizabeth's Church, Wrocław

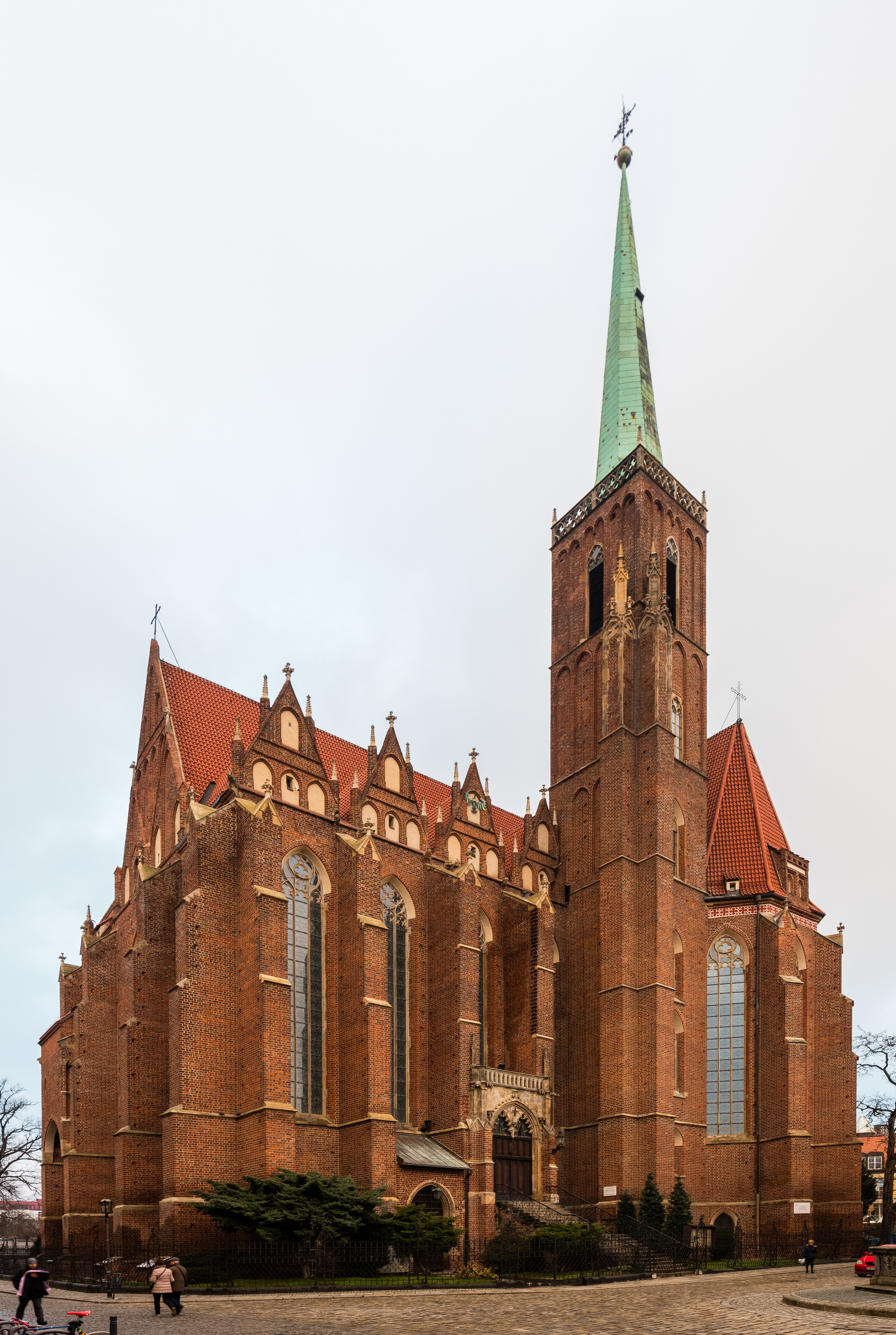
Holy Cross Church, Wrocław

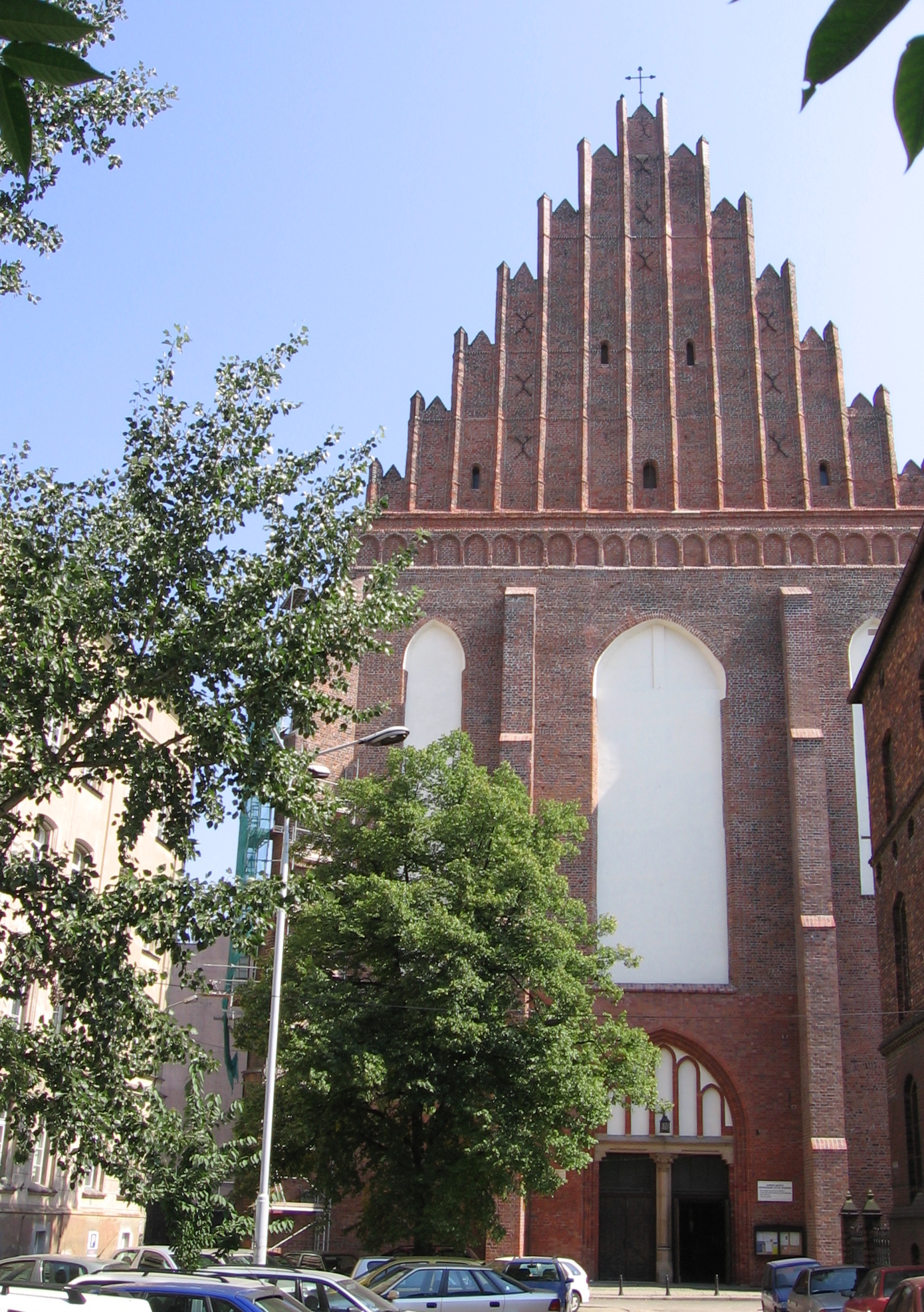
St. Dorothea Church, Wrocław

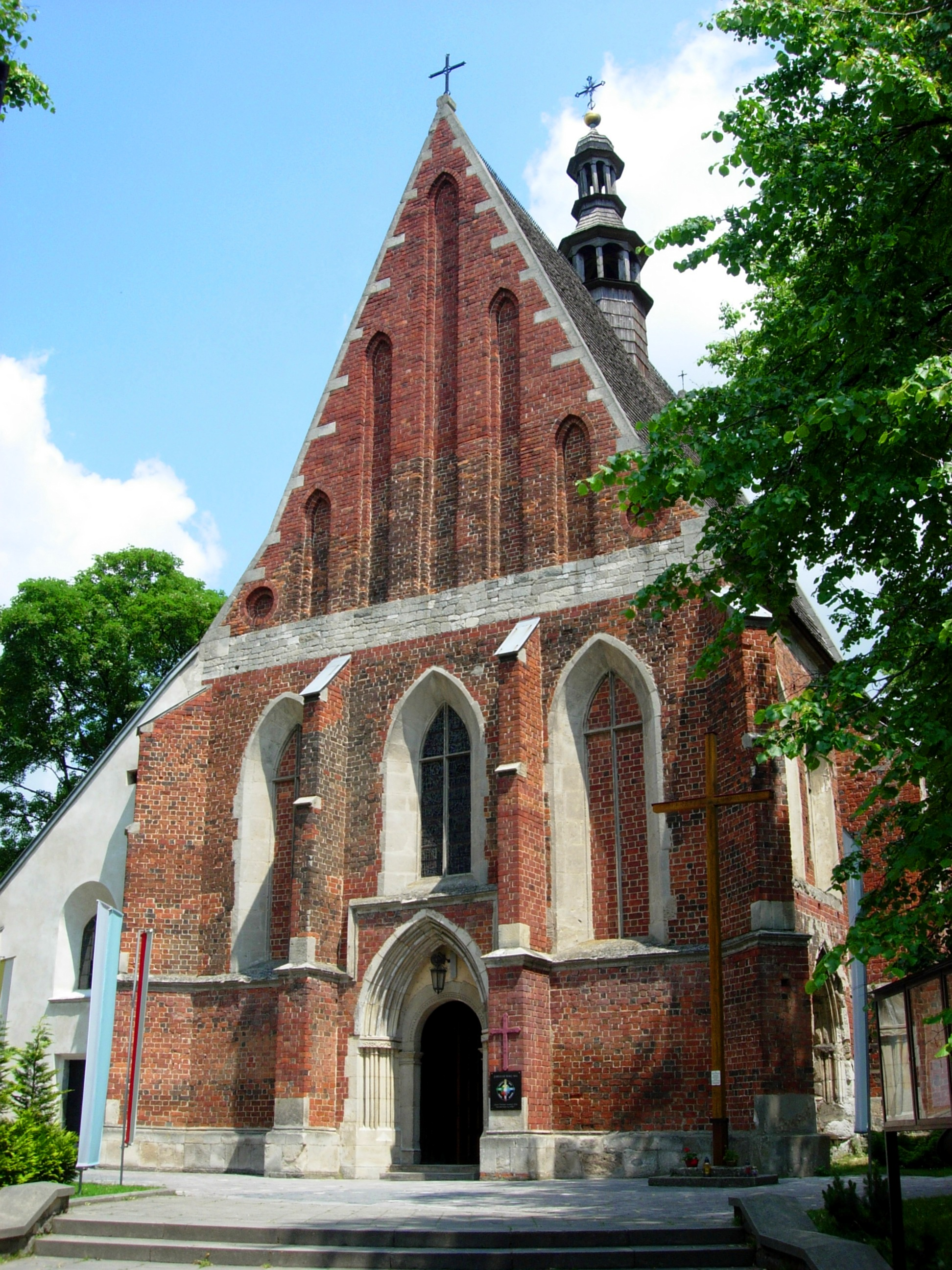
St. Ladislaus Church, Szydłów

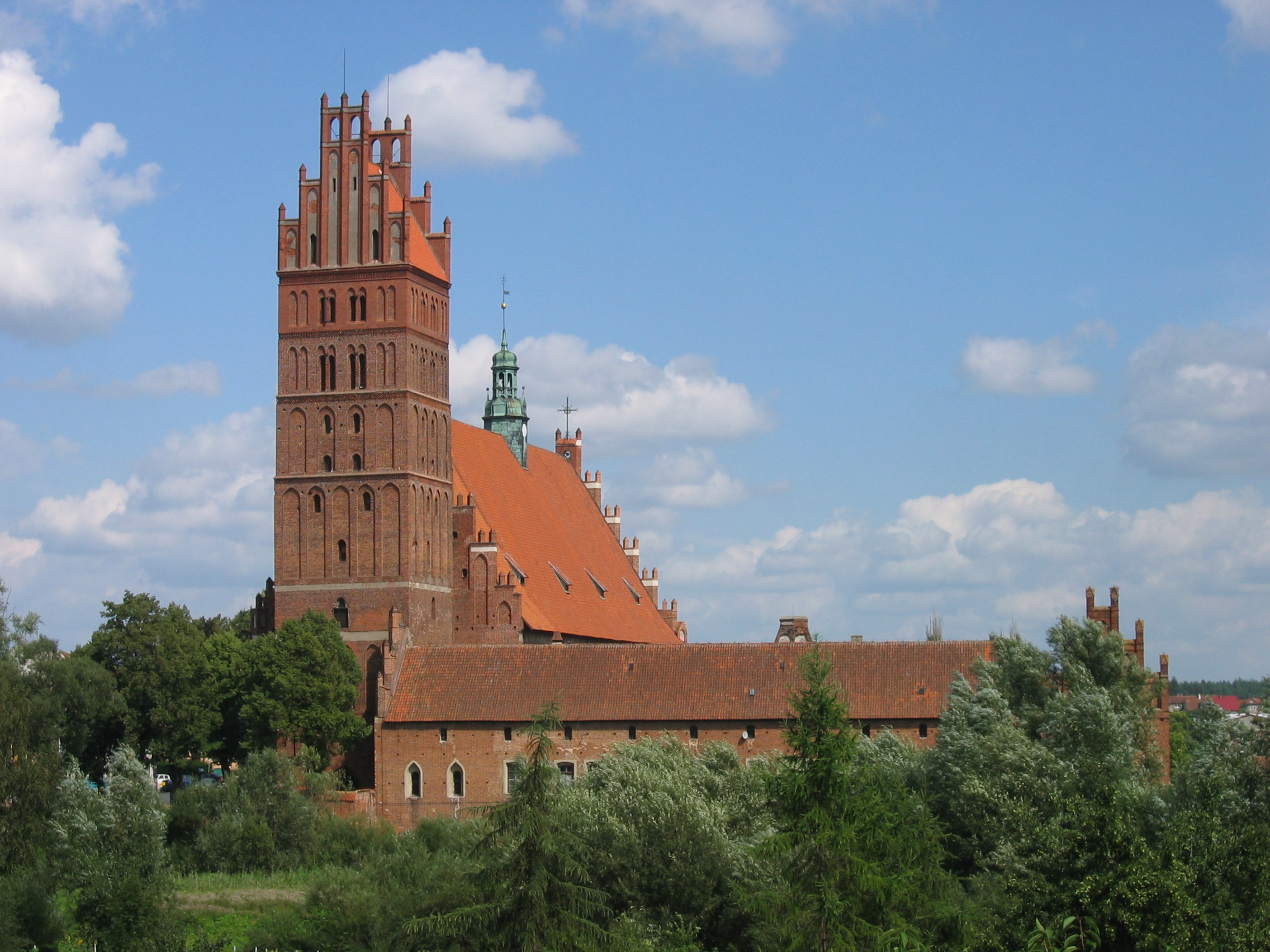
Collegiate church, Dobre Miasto

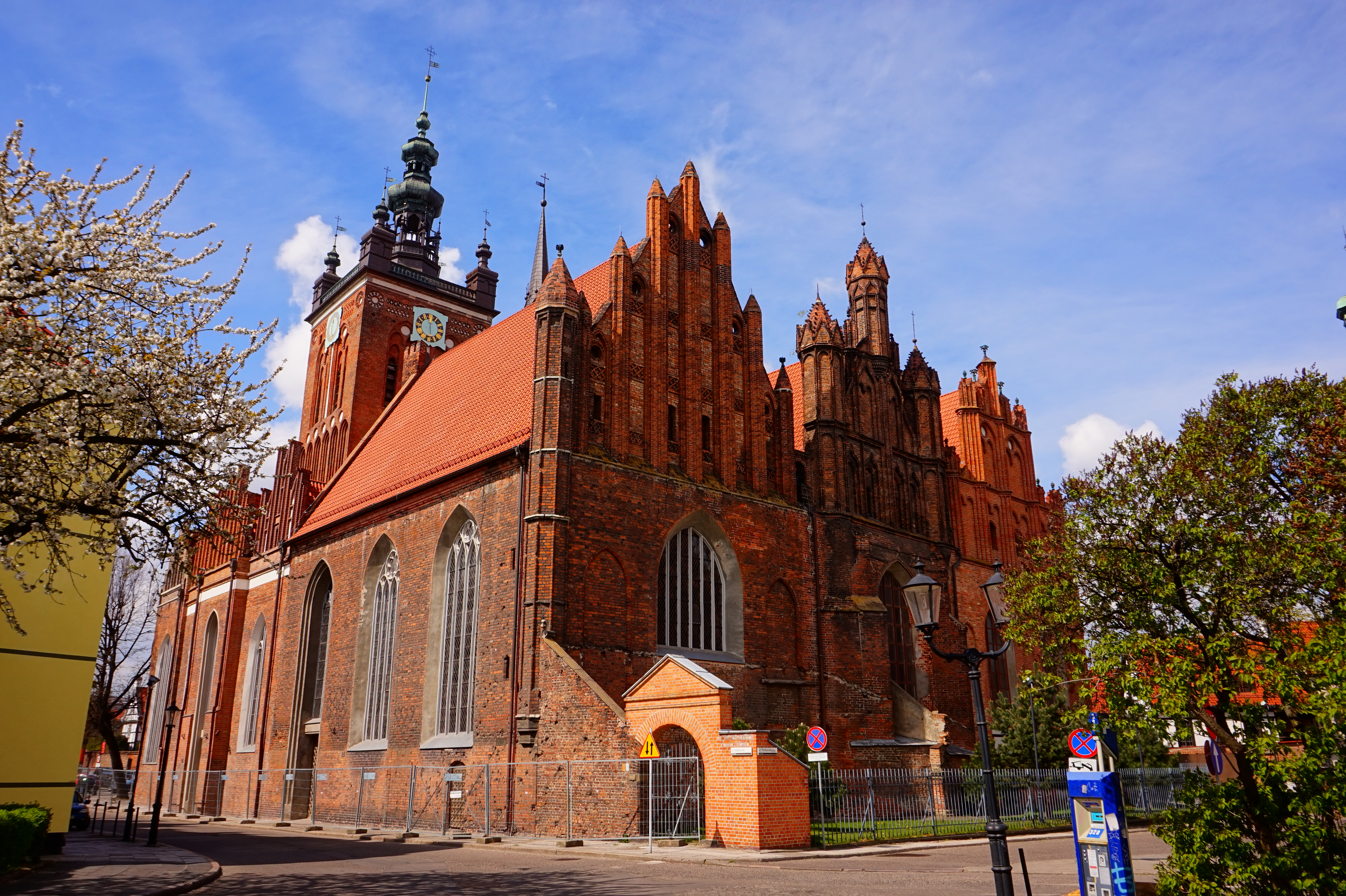
St. Catherine Church, Gdańsk

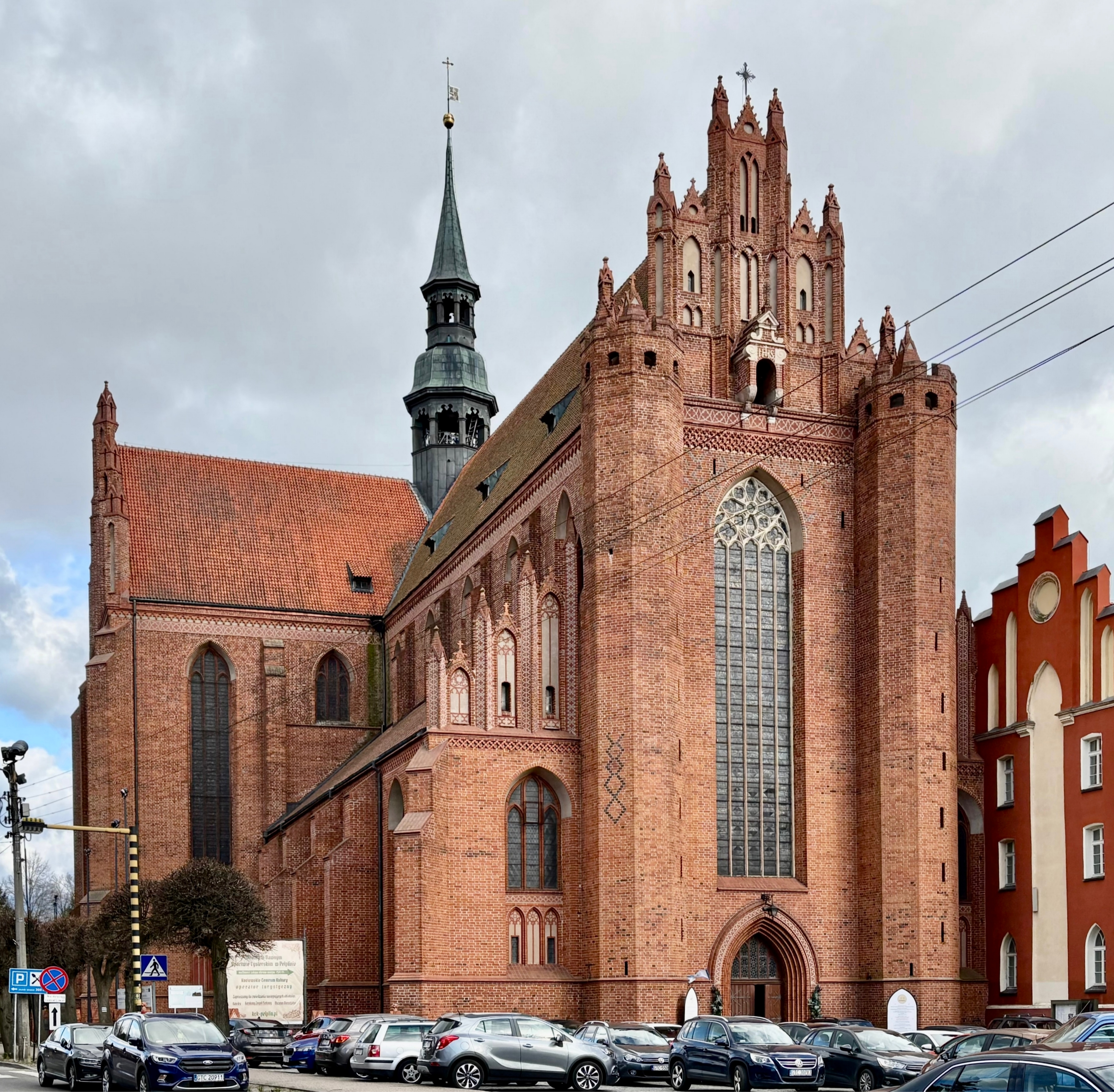
Cathedral, Pelplin

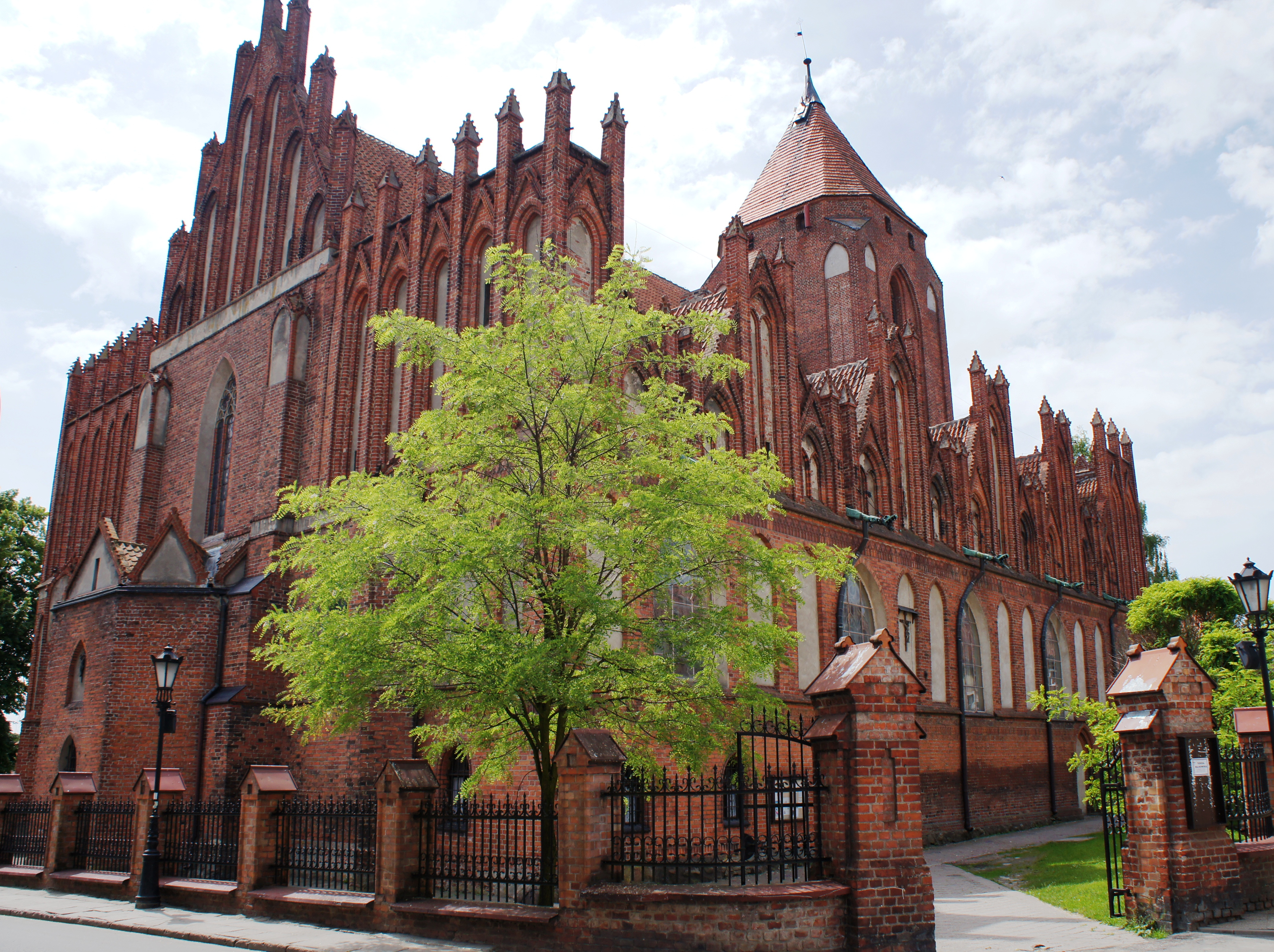
St. John the Baptist Church, Orneta

== Other buildings ==
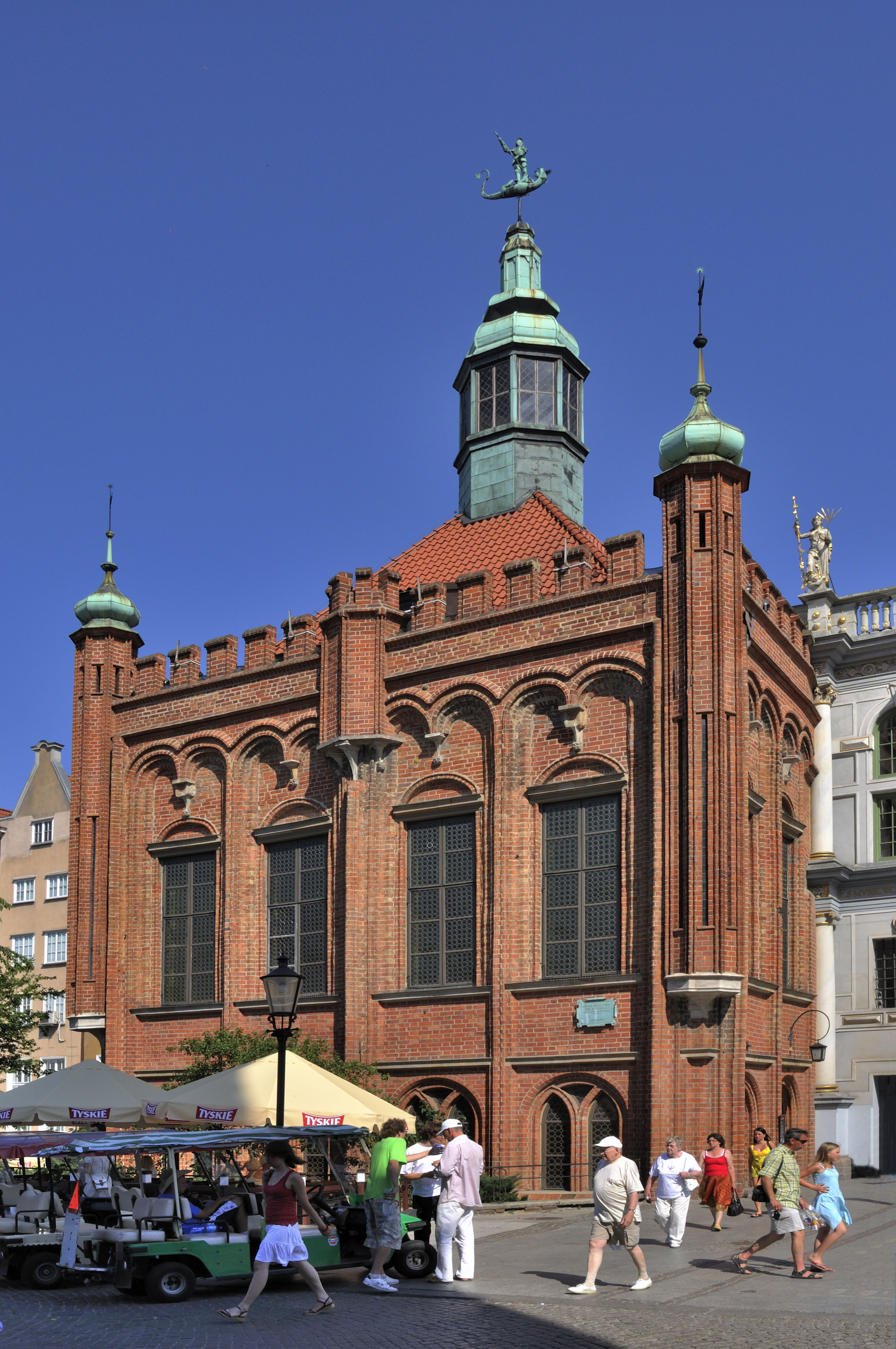
St. George Manor, Gdańsk

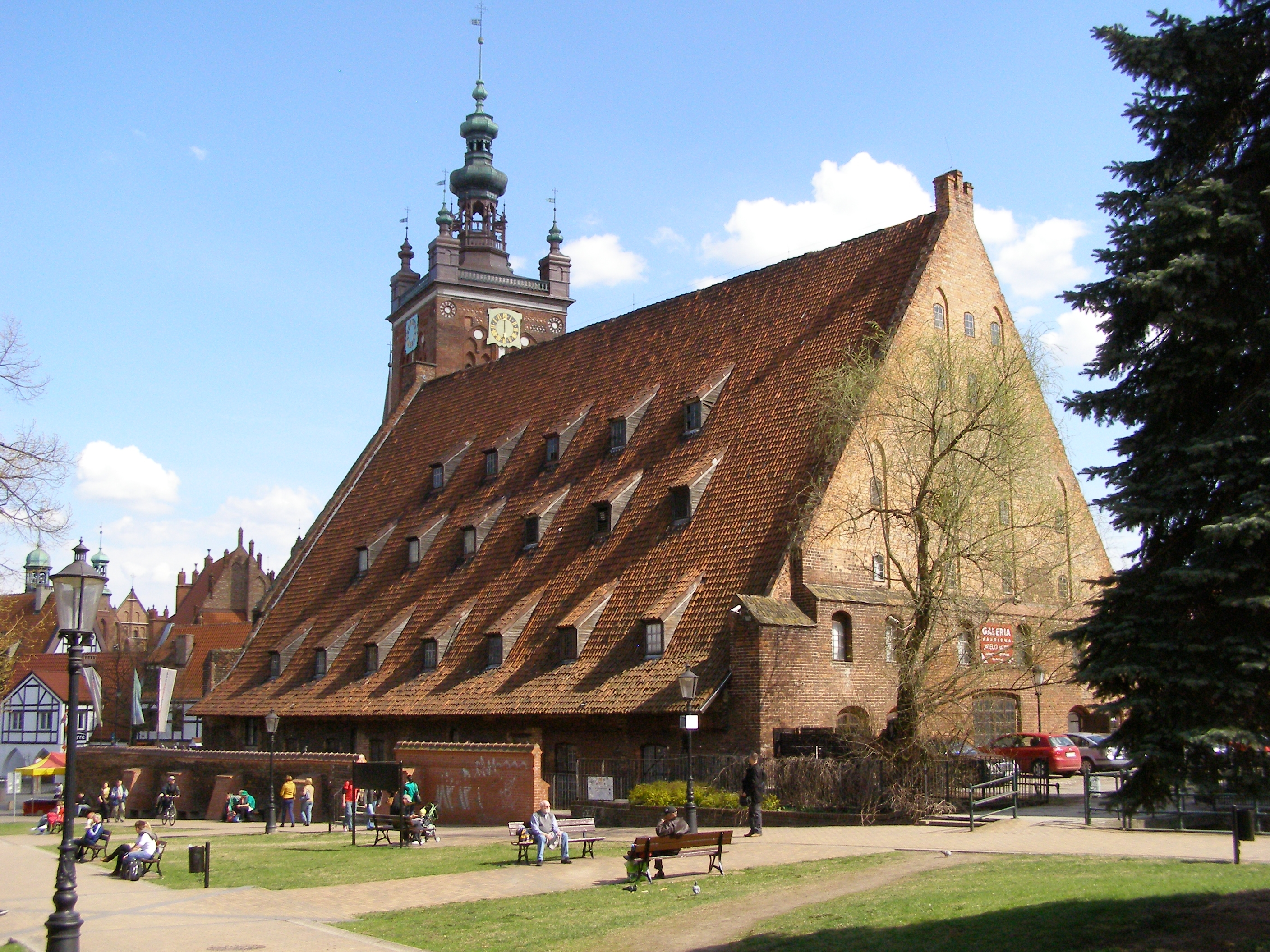
Great Mill, Gdańsk

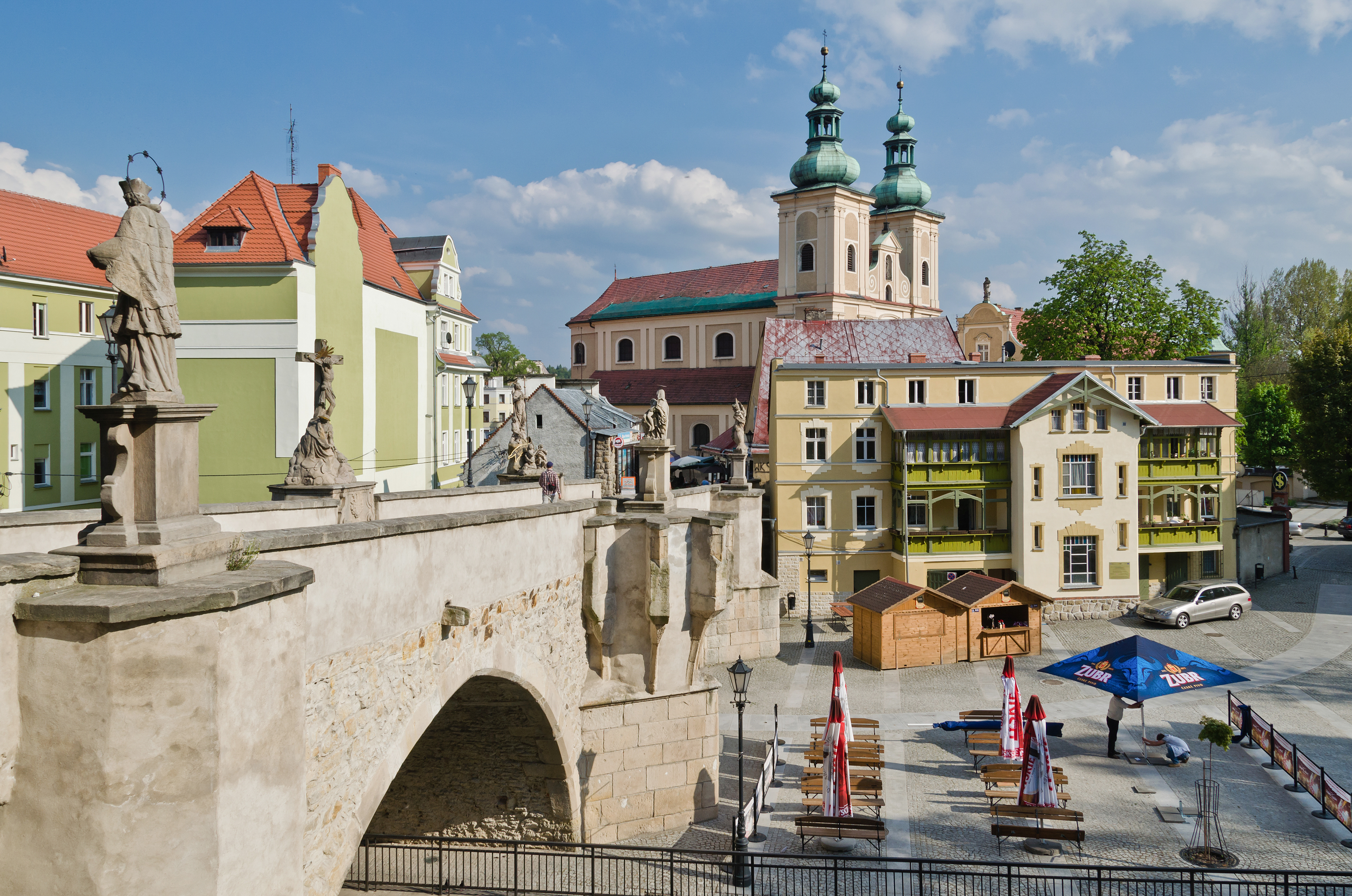
Gothic Bridge on millrace, Kłodzko

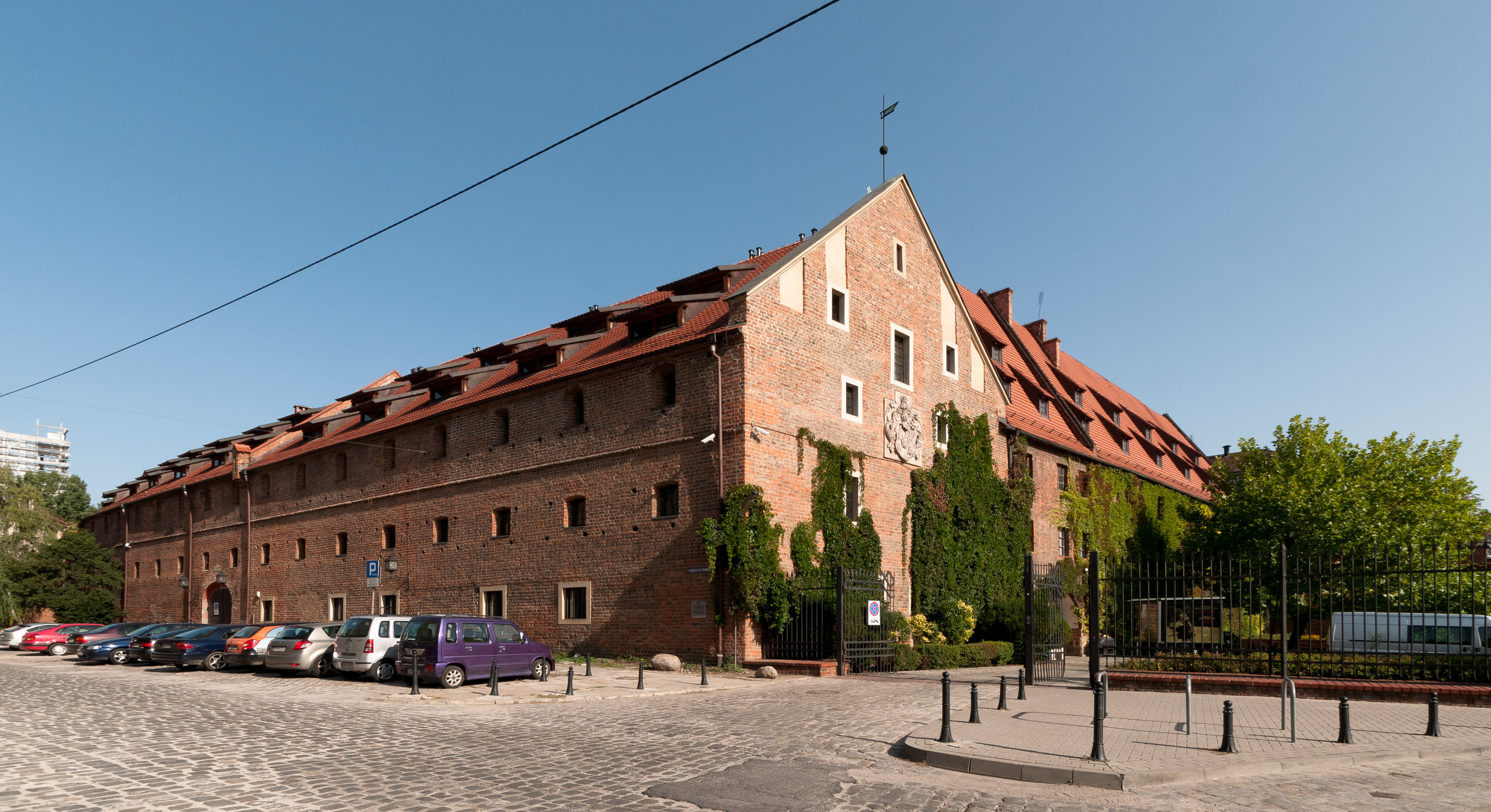
Arsenal, Wrocław

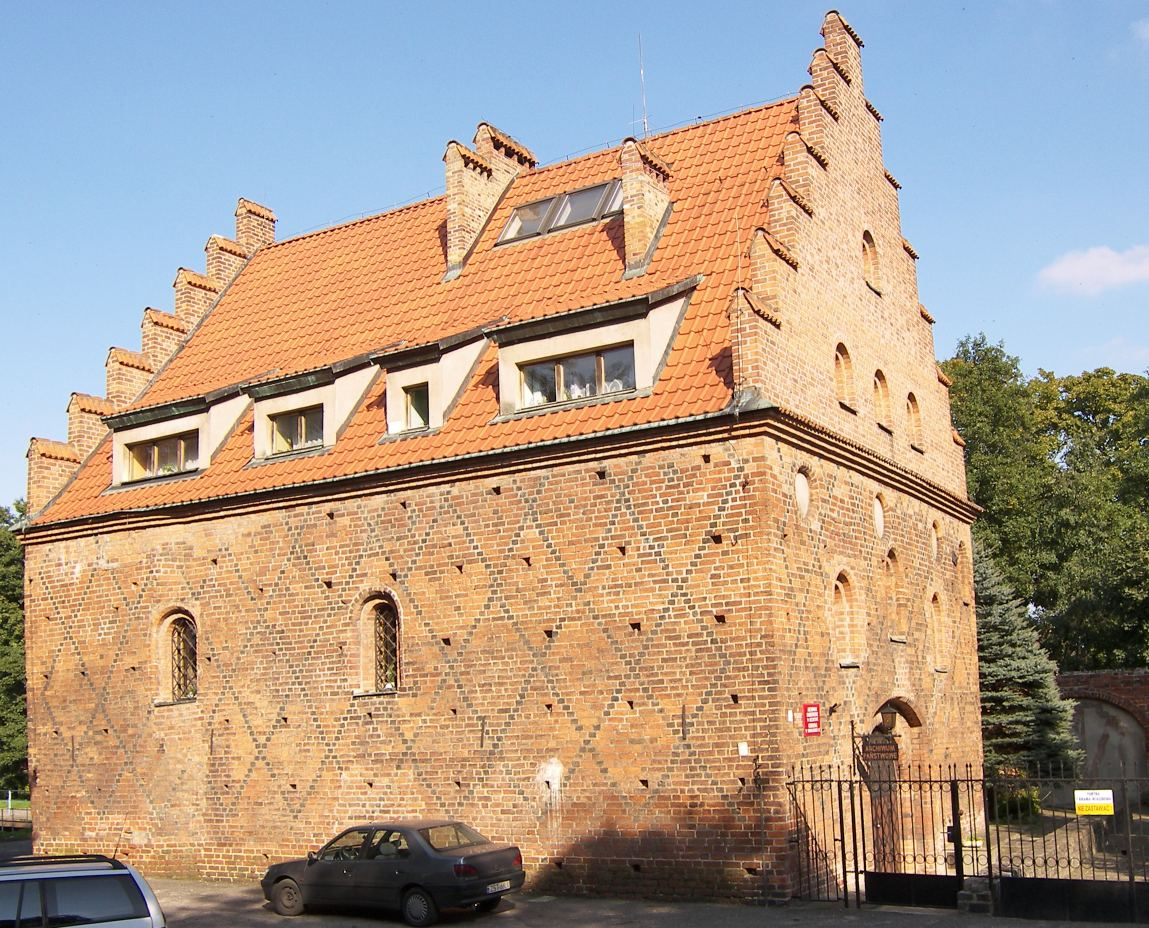
Arsenal, Stargard

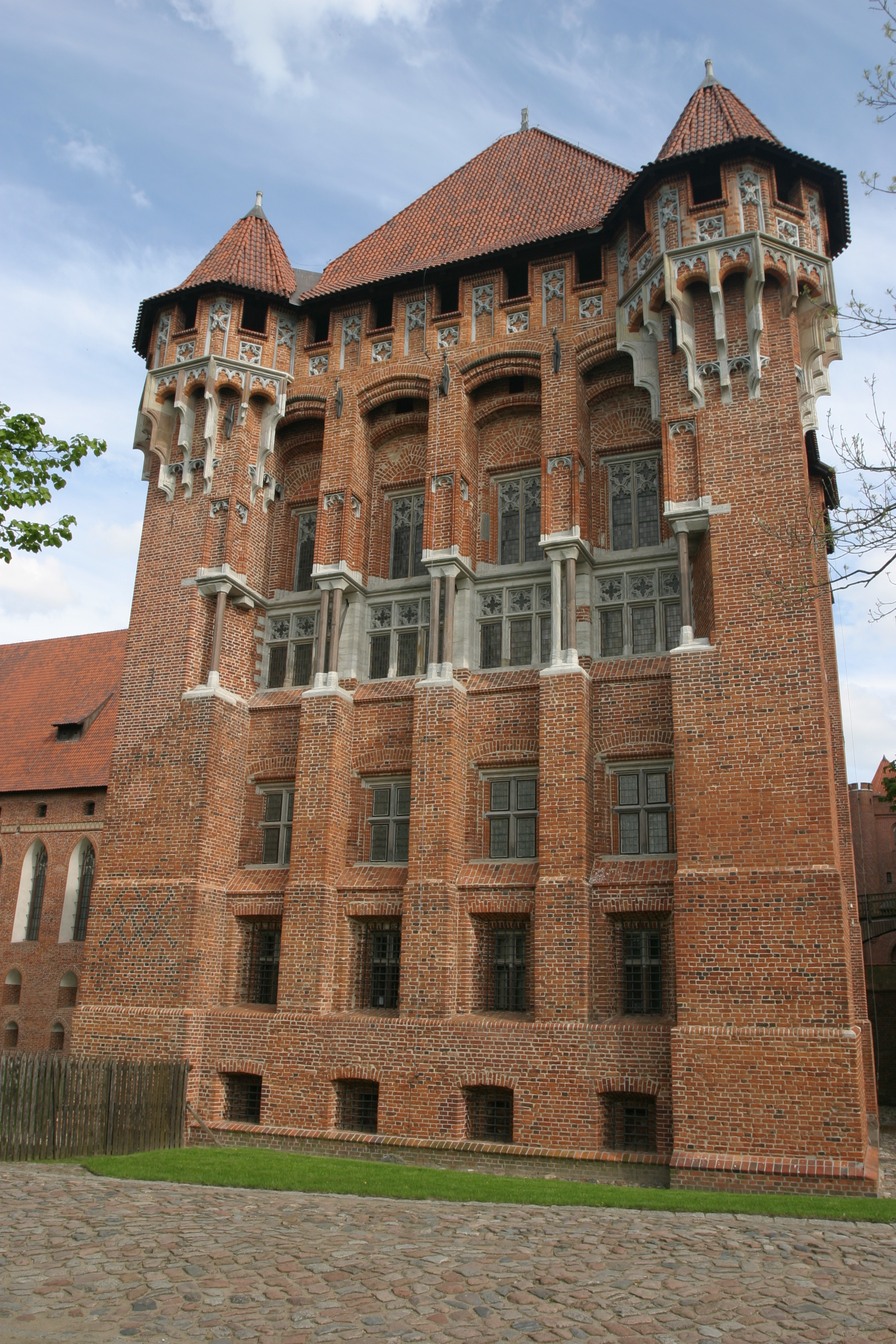
Palace Great Masters in Malbork

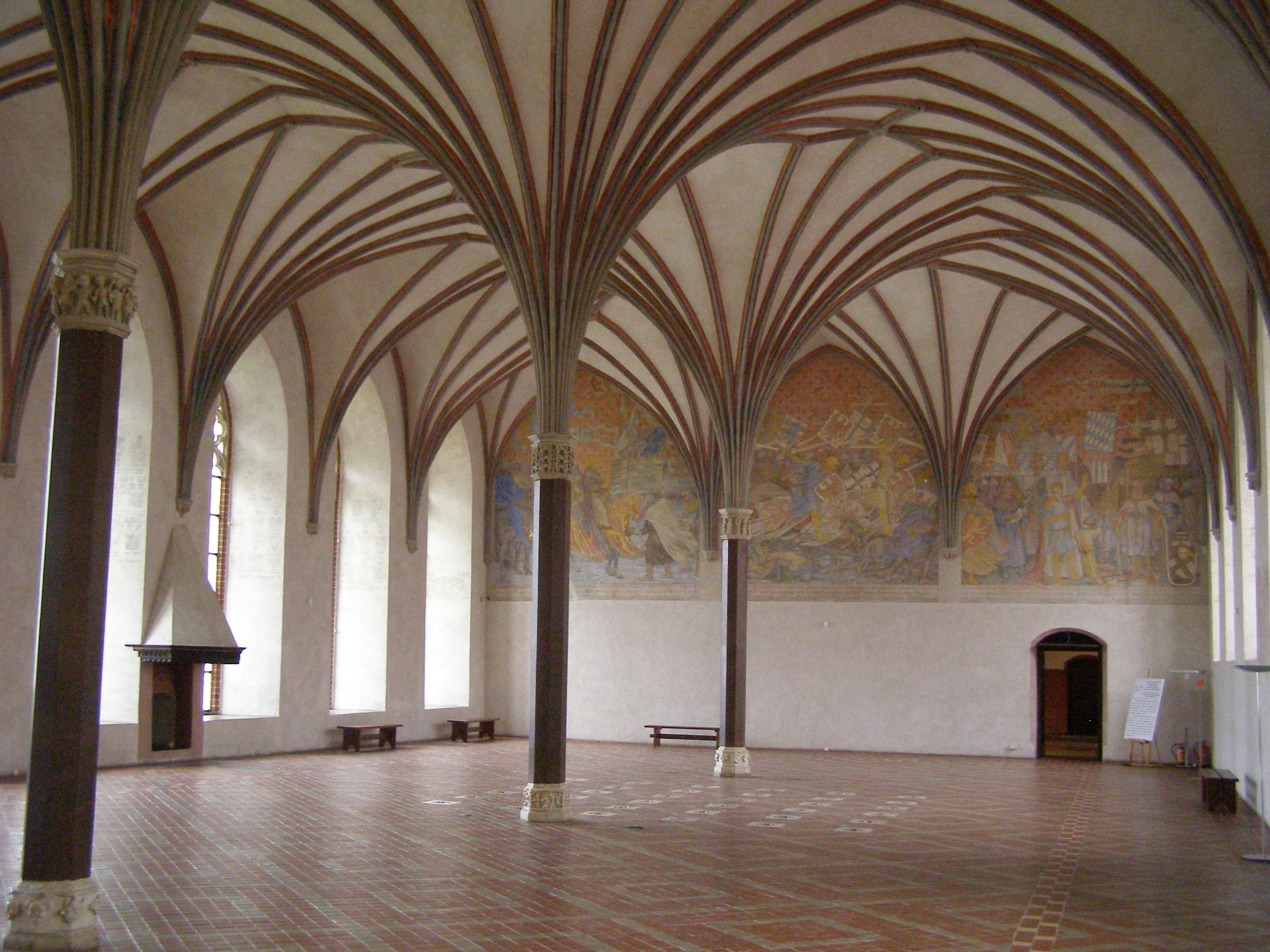
Refectory in Malbork Castle

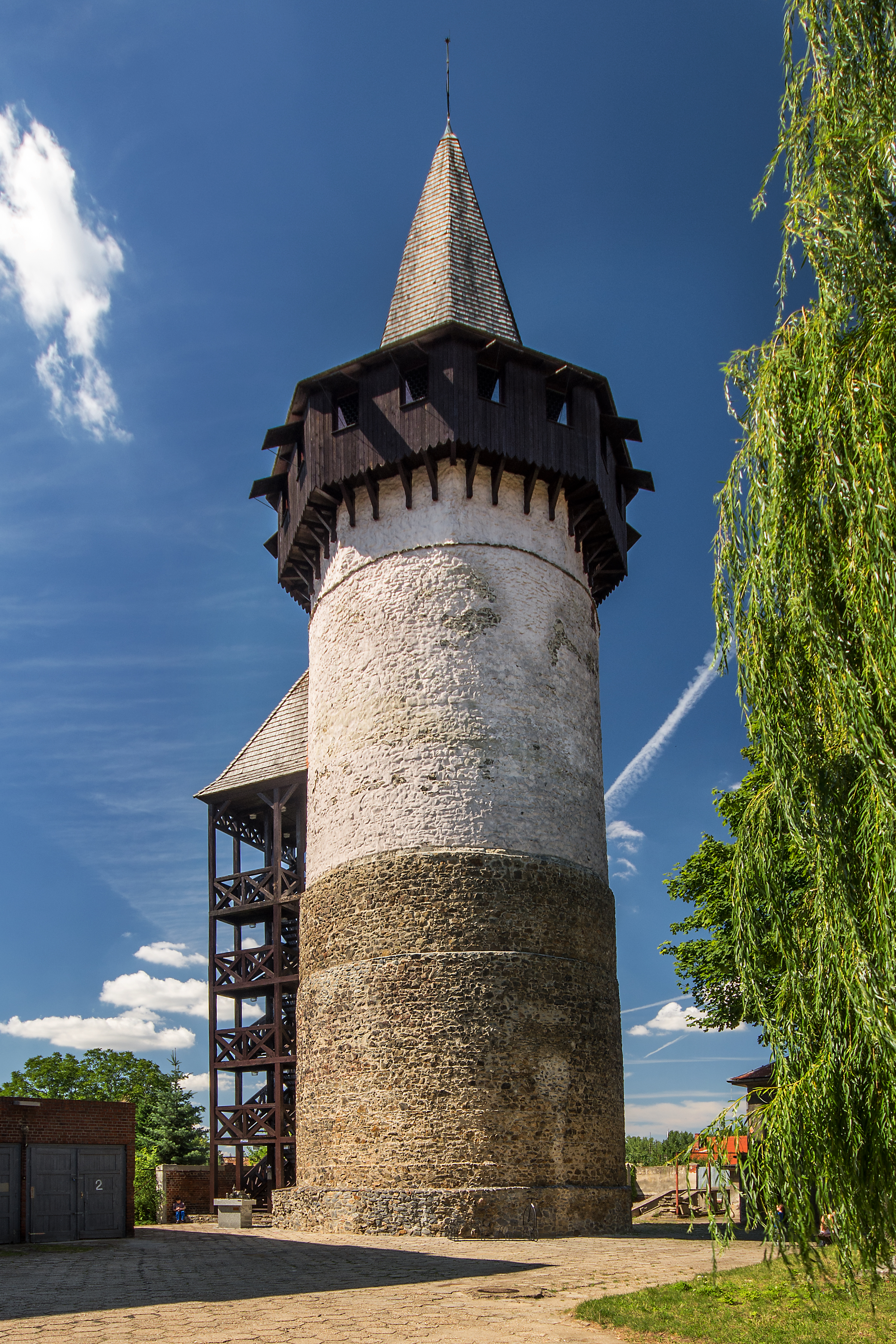
Wok's Tower, Prudnik

== See also ==
- Culture of medieval Poland
