= Battle of Trojanów =

- Part of Lithuanians raids on Poland
Date	1294
Location	Trojanów
Result	Lithuanian victory

Belligerents
Duchy of Sieradz-Łęczyca	Grand Duchy of Lithuania

Commanders and leaders
Casimir II of Łęczyca †	Vytenis

Strength
1,800	800

Casualties and losses
Heavy	Unknown

The Battle of Trojanów was a battle on 10 June 1294, on the banks of the Bzura River, a battle took place between the Lithuanians returning from a looting raid on Łęczyca and the pursuing army of the Duke of Łęczyca Casimir II. The Lithuanians, under the command of Duke Vytenis, on Pentecost, June 4, invaded the city of Łęczyca and captured the fortified collegiate church at Tuma. They plundered everything of any value, the priests and people were taken captive and the collegiate church itself was set on fire. During their retreat, they were caught up by the troops of Duke Casimir II at Trojanów. Then Duke Bolesław II of Masovia (married to the daughter of the Lithuanian Duke Traidenis) led to a truce between Casimir II and the Lithuanians, but at the least expected moment the Vytenis broke it and attacked Casimir II, as a result of which the Duke of Łęczyca was killed, (Note: Feliks Koneczny, in Saints in the History of the Polish Nation, in the chapter The Resumption of the Kingdom, states that in the course of the battle a temporary ceasefire was agreed, but the Lithuanians treacherously resumed the battle. The surprised Polish horde went into disarray and Prince Casimir II was murdered.) and Bolesław II's life was saved by Lawrence, Castellan of Biała. This was the greatest victory of the Lithuanians in their battles against the Poles (in fact against the Łęczyca knights).

== Battle according Jan Długosz ==
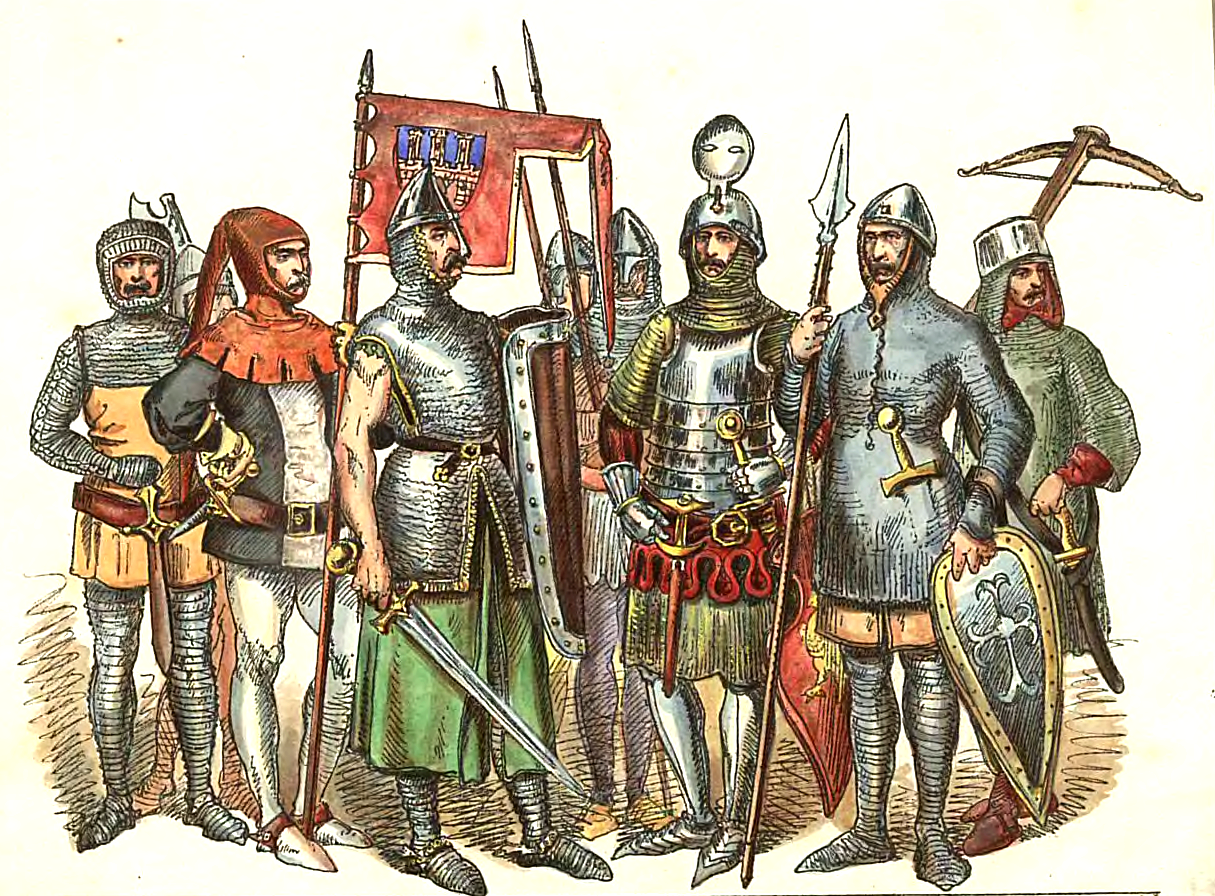
Polish knights 1228—1333

This is how polish chronicler Jan Długosz described the battle:

In the year of our Lord 1294, Lithuanian Duke Vytenis invades the Łęczyca region with a mounted army of 1,800 men: (Note: Peter of Dusburg ..., pp. 157 - 158 states that the Lithuanian division consisted of 800 men) Lithuanians, Prussians and Samogitians. (Note: Information about the participation of Prussians and Samogitians in the expedition is found only in Dlugosz cf. Aścik Kazimierz, Najazd Litewski ..., p. 5.) When, on the Thursday after Pentecost, they forced their way into it through forests and groves with the permission and support of Duke Boleslaw of Mazovia (Note: The support of Bolesław II of Mazovia for the Lithuanians is taken for granted: Sroka Stanisław, Kazimierz II, in: Piastowie - leksykon biograficzny, Kraków 1999, p. 219, Suchodolska Ewa, Dzieje polityczne połowa XIII w. - mid-14th c, in: Dzieje Mazowsza do 1526 roku - pod red. Aleksandra Gieysztora i Henryka Samsonowicza, Warsaw 1994, p. 191, Zajączkowski Stanisław, W sprawie najazdu Litewskiego na Łęczycę w 1294 roku, (in:) Studia i materiały do historii wojskowości, vol. XII, z. 2, Warsaw 1966, p. 324. A slightly different position of Bolesław II towards the Lithuanian campaign is attempted by Aleksander Swieżawski, Rawskie Duchy of the Piasts, Łódź 1974, p. 16, who maintains that the attack of Witenes was an element of the alliance of the Płock prince with Wenceslaus II of Bohemia aiming at removing the Kuyavian Piasts from their districts. The attitude of Bolesław II towards the Lithuanians was taken by Długosz, according to Aleksander Semkowicz, Krytyczny rozbiór ‘Dziejów Polski’ Jana Długosza (do roku 1384), Kraków 1887, p. 315, from a lost source, and is therefore fully reliable. In this lost source one could find information about the place of the battle given by the historian - Żuków, and about the escape of the captives at the critical moment of the battle and their drowning in the currents of the Bzura, see: Aścik Kazimierz, Once again about the invasion ..., s. 319.) in such silent and unknown array that they misled all who passed them, attacking first the collegiate church in Łęczyca and murdering there or taking captive a great number of the people of men and women who had gathered there to celebrate the feast. They take the prelates, canons and priests of the Lord captive without mercy, and plunder the liturgical vestments, vessels and jewels. The others, who had taken refuge in the church and defended themselves there valiantly, are suffocated and executed by setting fire to the neighbouring houses surrounding the church and transferring the fire to the collegiate church. The enemies then scattered to the villages and settlements and, having taken a great booty in the form of men and cattle, hastened back. Casimir, the Duke of Łęczyca, could not bear the defeat of himself and his army, but with all the knights of the Łęczyca land began to pursue the barbarians. When he caught up with them in the village of Żuków, situated near the town of Sochaczew on the river Bzura (according to others, near the village of Trojanów), disregarding the small number of his army and the cloud of enemies, he threw himself at the barbarians. And after a bloody battle, when many captives escaped in the fervour of the battle, defeated by the barbarian cloud, fighting very bravely in the first ranks, he falls in the largest crowd of enemies and suffers a glorious death. When this (prince) died, the Poles began to flee in all directions. Many of the Poles, avoiding an honourable death, expose themselves to a shameful one. They drowned in the Bzura river beyond which the battle was fought, as the waters then swelled due to rain. (Note: Although this detail is only mentioned in Długosz, Roczniki ..., book VII, p. 356. but this information seems quite likely, see: Semkowicz Aleksander, Krytyczny rozbiór ..., p. 315.) The Lithuanians took both the spoils and the victory. And the booty they gathered in the form of Polish prisoners of war was supposedly so great that twenty Christians, Poles, fell to each barbarian in the division. (Note: Stryjkowski Maciej, O początkach, wywodach, dzielnościach, sprawach rycerskich i domowe sławnego narodu litewskiego, żemojdzkiego i ruskiego, przed tym nigdy od żadnego ani kuszone, ani opisane, z natchnienia Bożego a uprzejmie pilnego doświadczenia, oprac. Julia Radziszewska, Warsaw 1978, p. 225, put the number of captives at twenty thousand people, Abraham W., Poland and the Baptism of Lithuania, Krakow 1914, pp. 13 - 14, reduced it to fifteen thousand. All these figures, however, in view of the population potential of the principality of Łęczyca, seem to be grossly exaggerated. It is also unlikely that Witenes' detachment, numbering only 800 heads, would have been able to drag with them such a large number of prisoners, liturgical vessels and other treasures looted from the collegiate church at Tuma, and at the same time defeat the pursuing army of Casimir II at Trojanowo.) Casimir, the Duke of Łęczyce, left no one behind. — Długosz Jan, Roczniki czyli kroniki sławnego Królestwa Polskiego, ks. VII, p. 355 – 356.
