= Zachwatowicz =

Zachwatowicz is a surname. Notable people with the surname include:

- Jan Zachwatowicz (1900–1983), Polish architect, historian, and restorer
- Krystyna Zachwatowicz (born 1930), Polish scenographer, costume designer, and actress
