= Warsaw Barbican =

Barbican in Poland

Coordinates: 52°15′2″N 21°0′36″E

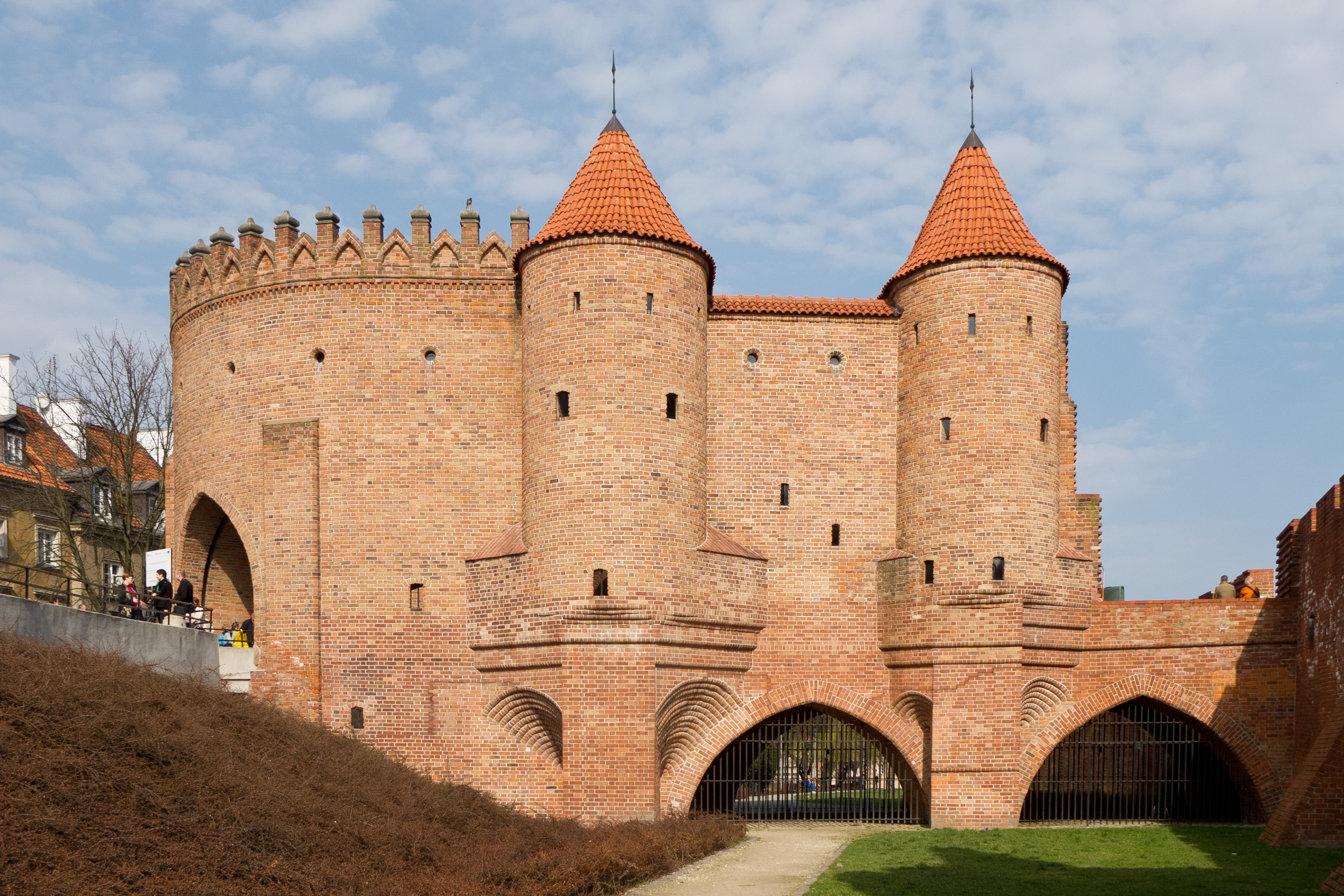
Warsaw Barbican, seen from outside the Warsaw Old Town city walls.

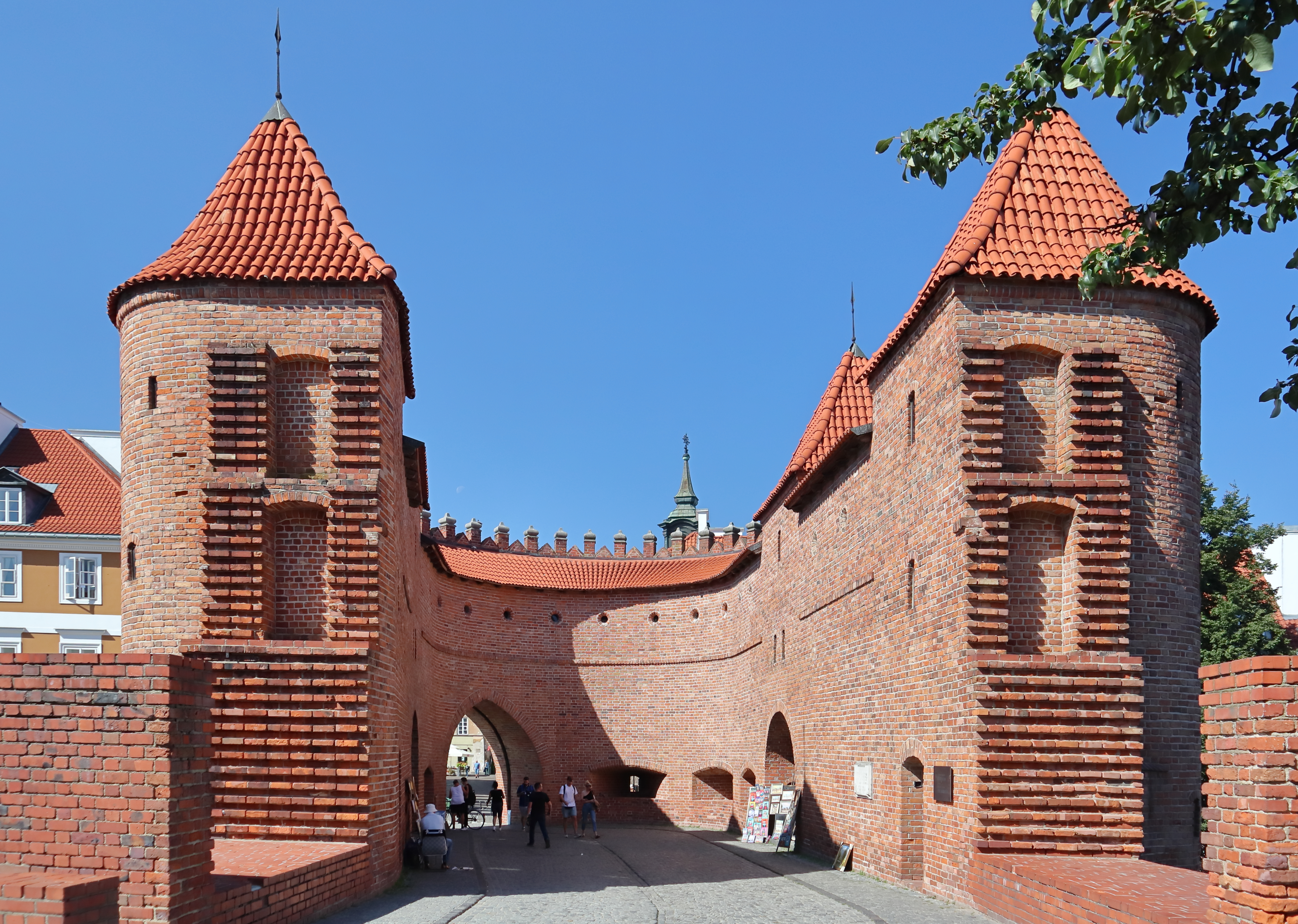
The barbican seen from within the Warsaw Old Town city walls

The Warsaw Barbican (Polish: barbakan warszawski) is a barbican (semicircular fortified outpost) in Warsaw, Poland, and one of few remaining relics of the complex network of historic fortifications that once encircled Warsaw. Located between the Old and New Towns, it is a major tourist attraction.

== History ==
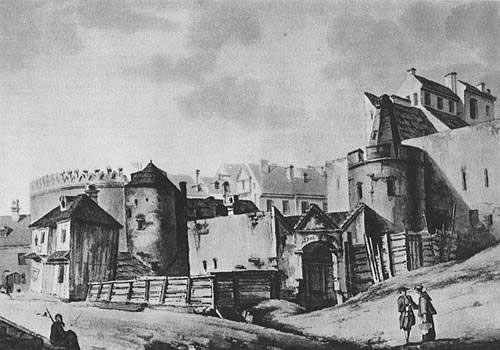
The barbican in a late-18th-century watercolor by Zygmunt Vogel

The barbican was erected in 1540 in place of an older gate to protect Nowomiejska Street. It was designed by Jan Baptist the Venetian, an Italian Renaissance architect who lived and worked in the Mazovia region of 16th century Poland and was instrumental in the redesign of the 14th-century city walls, which by that time had fallen into disrepair. The barbican had the form of a three-level semicircular bastion manned by fusiliers. It was 14 meters wide and 15 meters high from the bottom of the moat, which surrounded the city walls, and extended 30 meters from the external walls.

Almost immediately after its inception, the 4-tower barbican became an anachronism serving virtually no practical purpose. This was largely a result of the rapid advancement in artillery power. It was used in the defense of the city only once, during the Swedish invasion of Poland, on 30 June 1656, when it had to be recaptured by the Polish army of Polish king John II Casimir from the Swedes.

In the 18th century, the barbican was partially dismantled as its defensive value was negligible, and the city benefited more from a larger gate which facilitated movement of people and goods in and out of the city. In the 19th century, its remains were incorporated into newly built tenement buildings (kamienica). During the interwar period, in 1937–1938, Jan Zachwatowicz reconstructed part of the walls and the western part of the bridge, demolishing one of the newer buildings in the reconstruction process. However, a lack of funds delayed the barbican's planned complete reconstruction, and the 1939 invasion of Poland by Nazi Germany put the plans on hold. During World War II, particularly the Siege of Warsaw (1939) and the Warsaw Uprising of 1944, the barbican was largely destroyed, as were most of the Old Town's buildings. It was rebuilt after the war, during 1952–1954, on the basis of 17th-century etchings, as the new government decided it would be cheaper to rebuild the barbican and the nearby city walls as a tourist attraction than to rebuild the tenements. In its reconstruction, bricks were used from historic buildings demolished in the cities of Nysa and Wrocław; most of the barbican was rebuilt, save for two exterior gates and the oldest tower on the side of the Old Town. It is currently a popular tourist attraction.

== See also ==
- Kraków Barbican, the largest barbican in Poland. (Warsaw's is the second-largest.)
