= Devil Boruta =

Fictional character from Polish mythology

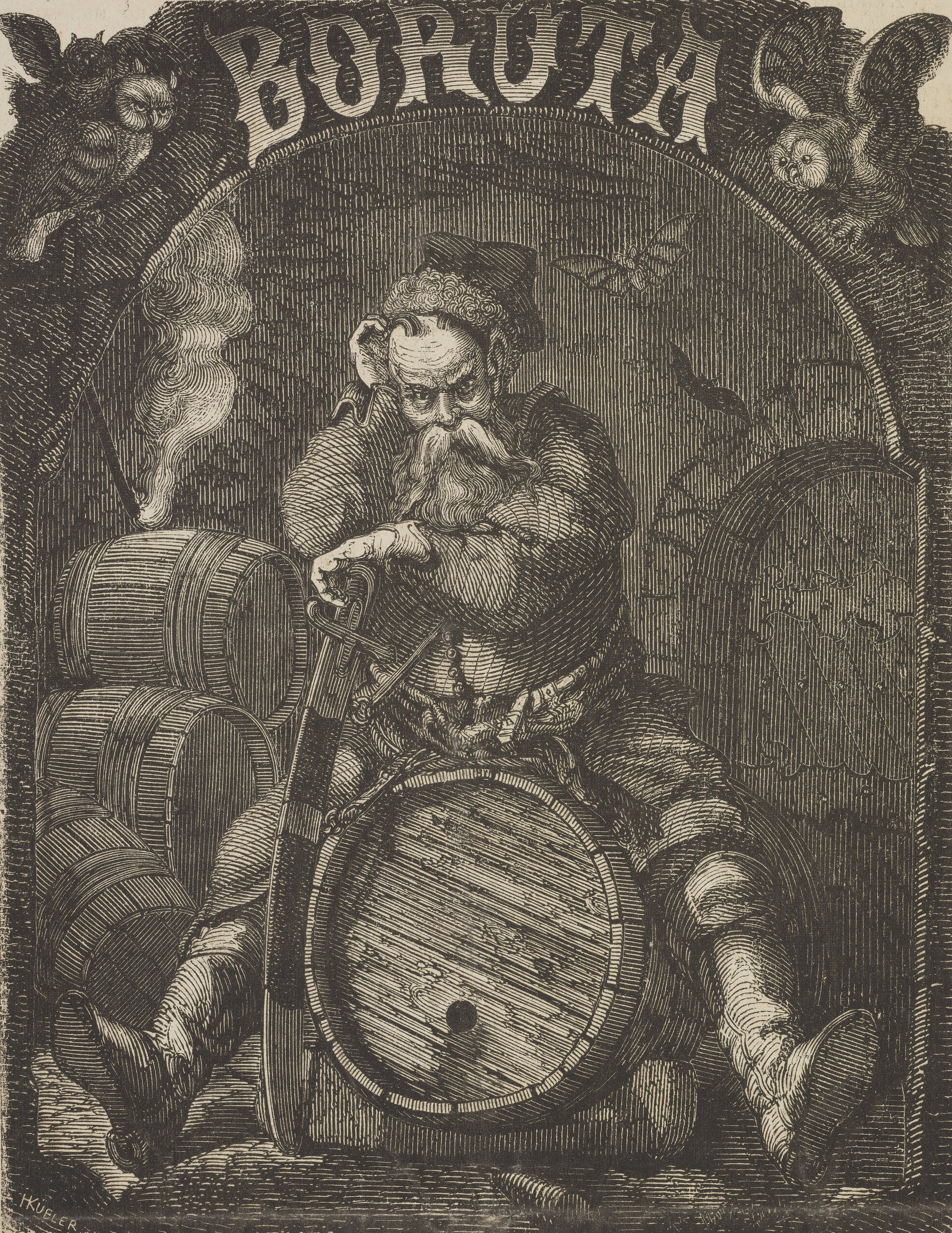
Boruta in the cellars of the King's Łęczyca Castle

Devil Boruta (Polish: Diabeł Boruta) is a fictional character from Polish mythology, folklore and literature, who is associated with the Polish town of Łęczyca.

The character is the transformation of the pagan Slavic leshy in post-Christianization times. Boruta is also referred to as błotnik, a swamp spirit.

He was usually considered to be a nobleman, and accordingly, he was usually busy with corrupting nobles, leaving other social classes to other devils - like Rokita the devil from the same region, who more often tempted peasants. Zygmunt Gloger and some other ethnologists believed that dressing Boruta as a nobleman is fakelore produced in the 19th century and reintroduced into folklore.

== In Encyklopedia staropolska ==
In Zygmunt Gloger's Encyklopedia staropolska ( 1900–1903) Boruta is described as follows:

Stories about Boruta, who was busy scaring people at night on dams and in forests and playing mischief by leading them astray, and who sometimes appeared in the form of a black dog, circulated throughout the country, both among the common people and the nobility, with the difference that the commoners believed in these, while the nobility laughed at these. There was never any talks about dressing the devil in the clothes of some stratum of the population, much less attaching him to some social caste. It was only some Polish writers in the first half of the 19th century who put into the people's mouths what they [people] had never heard from their fathers and had never told anyone, i.e. they dressed Boruta in a kontusz to enhance the effect of their printed legends, and thus popularized the stories that the folk maybe learned from books. As for us, however, we have not yet managed to find the legend of Boruta wearing a robe anywhere from the mouths of the folk, and the same is confirmed by Karłowicz. Ossoliński, writing about fears in the 18th century, says: "When the carter is stuck in the mud, he appeals to forest boruta." Linde defines the meaning of this word in Polish as follows: "The devil borowiec [forest spirit], błotnik [swamp spirit], an evil spirit, according to peasant fairy tales, living in swamps and muddy places."
