= Casimir II of Łęczyca =

Casimir II of Łęczyca (Polish: Kazimierz II łęczycki; c. 1261/62 – 10 June 1294) was a Polish prince and member of the House of Piast. He was Duke of Brześć Kujawski from 1267 to 1288, Duke of Dobrzyń from 1275 to 1288, and Duke of Łęczyca from 1288 until his death.

He was the fourth son of Casimir I of Kuyavia, but the second born from his third marriage with Euphrosyne, daughter of Casimir I of Opole. He was probably named after both his father and maternal grandfather.

== Life ==
=== Beginning of his government (1267–1288) ===
After the death of his father in 1267, Casimir II, together with his full-brothers, inherited their share of his lands under the regency of their mother until 1275, when they jointly ruled. Casimir II inherited his own domain in 1288, when after the death of his childless half-brother Leszek II the Black he received the Duchy of Łęczyca, situated in the centre of Poland.

=== Cooperation with Władysław I the Elbow-high during his struggle for Lesser Poland (1289–1292) ===
In 1289 Caismir II, together with his brother Władysław I the Elbow-high, supported the campaign of Bolesław II of Płock for the throne of Kraków. The joint Płock-Brześć-Łęczyca forces defeated on 26 February the Silesian troops commanded by Henry III of Głogów, Bolko I of Opole and Przemko of Ścinawa at the Battle of Siewierz. For unknown reasons, shortly after Bolesław II renounced to his claims over the Seniorate, an event who was used by Władysław I to conquer Lesser Poland for himself. With the close cooperation of Casimir II, Władysław I began a war against King Wenceslaus II of Bohemia. This policy suffered a defeat in the fall of 1292, when as a result of a Bohemian expedition Casimir II and his brother were captured by Wenceslaus II. In the subsequent peace treaty signed on 9 October of that year, both brothers were forced to pay homage to the Bohemian King.

=== Heir of Kraków (1293–1294). Death ===
Casimir II and Władysław I didn't give up, however, to their ambitious plans to conquer Lesser Poland and on 6 January 1293 they met at Kalisz with Przemysł II of Greater Poland and Jakub Świnka, Archbishop of Gniezno and began conversations for a joint action for the recovery of Kraków. They concluded a secret agreement whose exact details are only known for the copy gave to the Archbishop; under this treaty, Casimir II, Władysław I and Przemysł II are obliged to pay annually the amount of 300 pieces of fine silver from salt mines after the recovery of the capital of Lesser Poland.

Casimir II was killed in the Battle of Trojanów on 10 June 1294 on the bank of the Bzura river, while chasing a Lithuanian troops under the command of Vytenis, who escaped after an attack to Łęczyca on 4 June. Jan Długosz described the event as follows:

In the Year of our Lord of 1294 the Duke of Lithuania Vytenis invades the land of Łęczyca with an army of 1,800 Lithuanians, Prussians and Samogitians. When of Thursday after Pentecost they stormed the city through the woods with the permission and support of the Duke of Masovia Bolesław II they attacked first the collegiate of Łęczyca and murdered there or taking into slavery a large number of people who gathered there to celebrate the holidays. Prelates, canons and priests were taken into captivity without mercy, and the vestments, vessels and jewels stolen. Others, who had taken refuge in the church, defended it valiantly, by setting fire the neighboring houses surrounding the church and died there. The enemies then scattered villages and settlements, took away much of the people and hastily returned to their lands. Then the ruler of Łęczyca Prince Casimir and all his knights chased the barbarians. When they caught them in the village of Żuków near Sochaczew on the Bzura river (according to others was on the village of Trojanów), not counting with their small forces and the violence of the enemies, throws himself to the fight. After a bloody battle, when many prisoners escaped in the heat of the battle, and surrounded by a group of barbarians, the prince found a glorious death. When he (the prince) died, the Polish fled in all directions. Many of them, avoiding an honorable death, exposed themselves to a shameful drowning in the Bzura river where was the struggle, and where the water floods after rain. The Lithuanians took and loot this victory. They captured Polish prisoners of war, who apparently are so great that for each barbarian were captured twenty Christians. The Prince of Łęczyca Casimir didn't leave any one of them behind before his death.

Because Casimir II died unmarried and childless, his principality was inherited by Władysław I the Elbow-high. It's unknown where he was buried, probably in the Collegiate church of St. Mary and St. Alexius in Tum near Łęczyca.

== Ancestry ==
Casimir II of Poland
Konrad I of Masovia
Helen of Znojmo
Casimir I of Kuyavia
Svyatoslav III Igorevich
Agafia of Rus
Iaroslava Riurikovna of Kiev
Casimir II of Łęczyca
Mieszko I Tanglefoot
Casimir I of Opole
Ludmila (of Bohemia?)
Euphrosyne of Opole
?
Viola
?
