= Knight Tower =

Historical defensive tower in Warsaw, Poland

- Baszta Rycerska
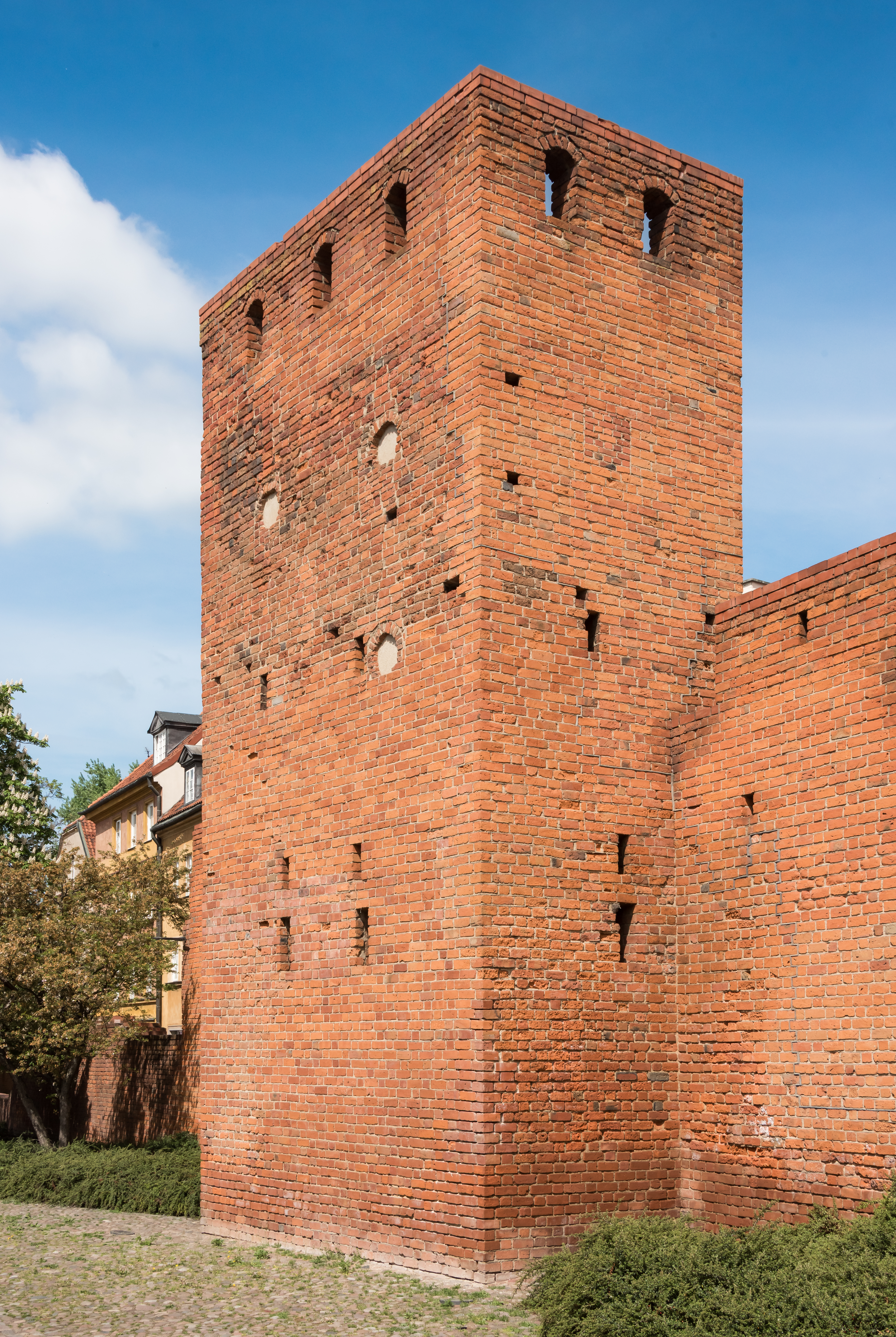
- The structure in 2025.
- Interactive map of the Knight Tower area

General information
- Type: Defensive tower
- Architectural style: Gothic
- Location: Warsaw, Poland, Rycerska Street
- Coordinates: 52°14′55.4″N 21°00′37.1″E
- Completed: 14th century
- Renovated: 1958–1963

Technical details
- Floor count: 5

UNESCO World Heritage Site
- Criteria: Cultural: (ii), (vi)
- Designated: 1980
- Part of: Historic Centre of Warsaw
- Reference no.: 30bis

Historic Monument of Poland
- Designated: 1994-09-08
- Part of: Warsaw – historic city center with the Royal Route and Wilanów
- Reference no.: M.P. 1994 nr 50 poz. 423

The Knight Tower (Polish: Baszta Rycerska), also known as the Knight House (Polish: Dom Rycerski), is a historic Gothic defensive tower in Warsaw, Poland, at Rycerska Street, in the inner city wall of the Old Town, between Piekarska and Wąski Dunaj Streets. It was built in the 14th century, before 1339, and later expanded at the turn of the 16th century. In 1614, it was turned into a residential building, and it was restored to its historic form between 1958 and 1963.

== History ==
The tower was constructed before 1339, as part of the inner city wall of Old Warsaw and was used by the city guards. The structure was built in a Gothic style, with a square base and four storeys, and lacking a back wall, which would face the town. It had wooden ceilings supported on side wall offsets. After 1379, it was expanded with another storey, featuring embrasures, which were later remodelled in the second half of the 15th century, or at the beginning of the 16th century. At the turn of the 17th century, the holes above the first storey were bricked up. In 1614, the city sold it to Adam Leszczyński, who turned it into a residential building.

The tower was damaged in the Second World War, with an upper half of its southern wall being destroyed. It was renovated between 1958 and 1963. This included the reconstruction of the destroyed wall, restoration of the previously covered embrasures, and clearing out the artefacts of its residential past. In 1965, it was entered into the regional heritage list.

The nearby Rycerska Street (Polish: Ulica Rycerska, lit. Knight Street), was named after the tower. The name was first attested in the 18th century.

== Overview ==
The brick defensive tower has a square base and is five stories tall. The structure faces to the southeast and lacks a back wall. Its façade features numerous embrasures. On the inside, it has wooden ceilings supported on side wall offsets. The structure is attached to a short remaining portion of the historic inner city wall.
