= Granary on the Narew river =

Coordinates: 52.4334°N 20.6807°E

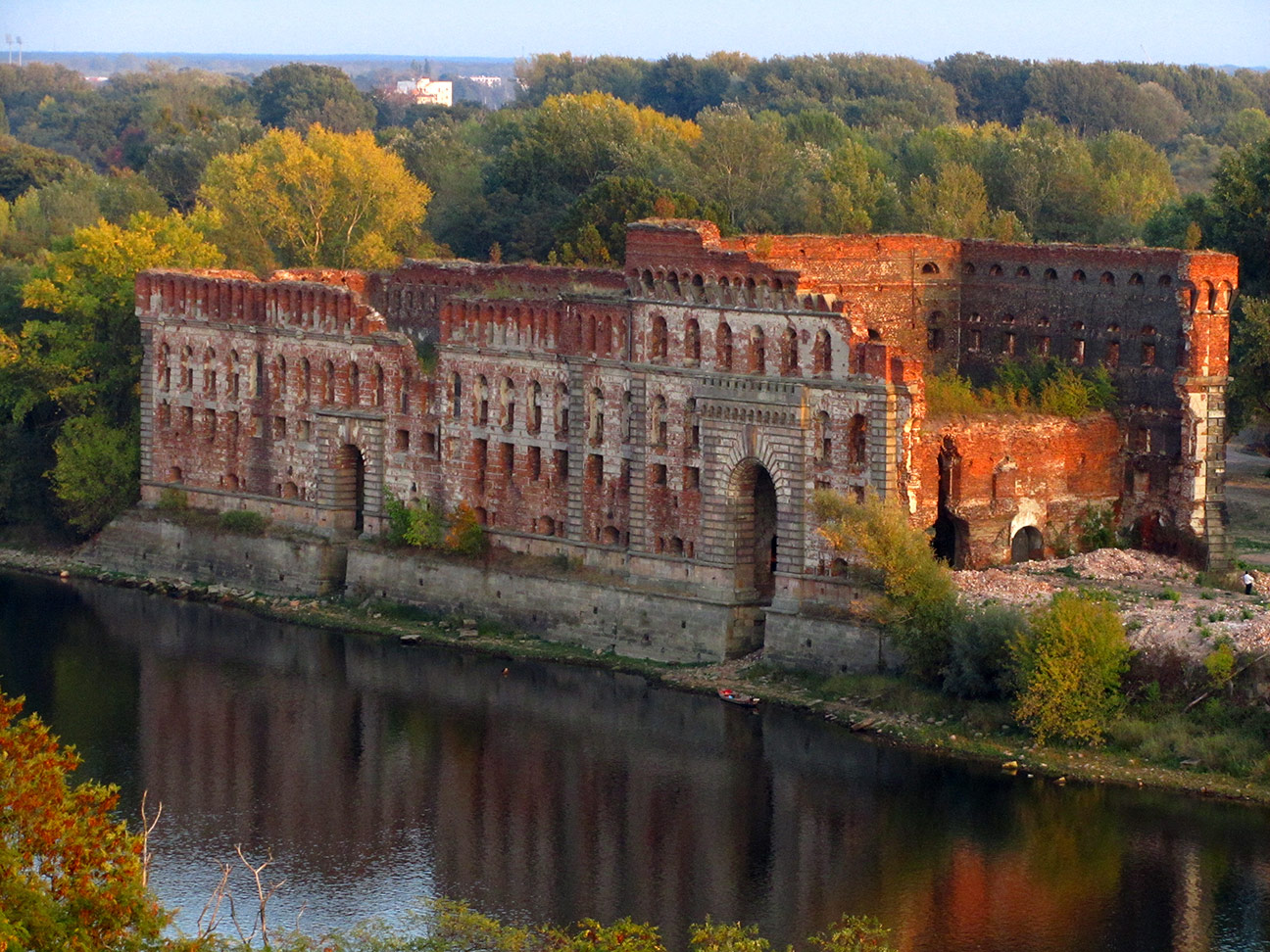
Granary on the Narew river

The Granary on the Narew river is a granary built in 1838-44 in Nowy Dwór Mazowiecki near the mouth of the Narew river in north-eastern Poland.

== Golden age ==
The building was built in the neo-Renaissance style by Polish architect Jan Jakub Gay and funded by the Polish Bank. The granary besides storage tasks could fulfill functions of defense, because the first floor was provided with holes adapted to conduct artillery and gun fire. Role of a grain storage position it held until 1853, when it was bought by the then military authorities from the Polish Bank for the purpose of storage for Modlin Fortress. In the interwar granary was the seat of the Naval Headquarters Modlin, then Central and Main Navy Depot. It stored in it, among other things, hardware engineer, a position it held until the outbreak of World War II.

== Period of totalitarianism ==
During bombing in 1939 the granary was burned inside by firebombs, however thick walls rescued him and in such a state waited it out until the end of the war. After the war for recommending communist authorities they set about to the demolition of the granary which Prof. Jan Zachwatowicz stopped, the chief architect rebuilding Warsaw. Unfortunately they managed to knock the west wing of the granary down and reclaimed building materials were probably used for post-war repairs, and according to some opinions used by the army as different targets.

== Today ==
In 1999 the granary played the role of the Castle Horeszków in film adaptation of the poem of Adam Mickiewicz "Pan Tadeusz" directed by Andrzej Wajda. In 2010 the ruin of the granary was sold through the city Nowy Dwór Mazowiecki of the west blade for the local developer which has plans of rebuilding dismantled in the form modern and of creating a five-star hotel in it with a conference centre and a harbour.
