= Łęczyca =

Town in Łódź Voivodeship, Poland

- Królewskie Miasto Łęczyca
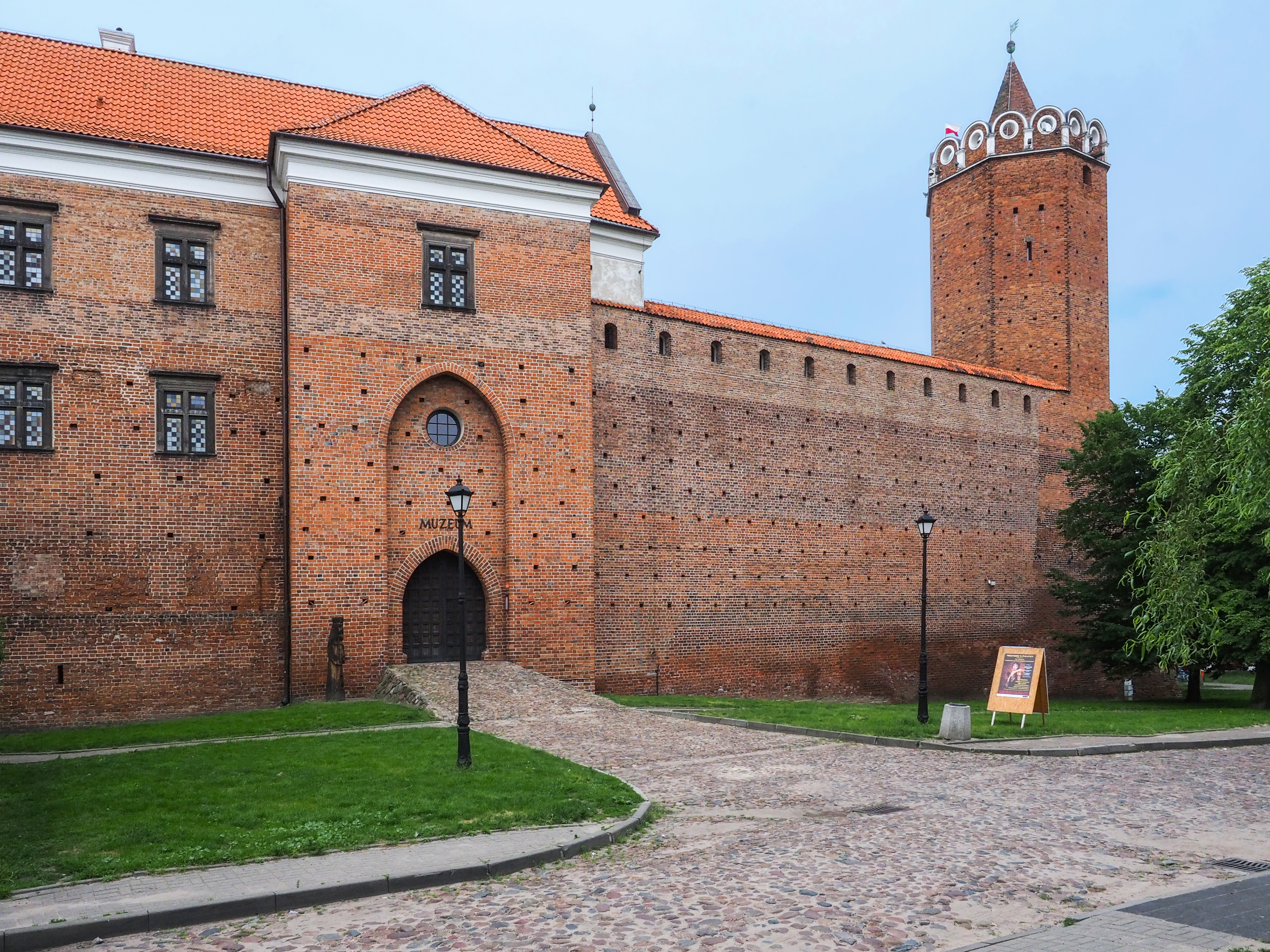
- Łęczyca Royal Castle

- Coat of arms

- Location within Poland
- Coordinates: 52°3′N 19°12′E
- Country: Poland
- Voivodeship: Łódź
- County: Łęczyca
- Gmina: Łęczyca (urban gmina)

Government
  - Mayor: Paweł Kulesza

Area
  - Total: 9.0 km^{2} (3.5 sq mi)

Population (31 December 2021)
  - Total: 13,587
  - Density: 1,500/km^{2} (3,900/sq mi)
- Time zone: UTC+1 (CET)
  - Summer (DST): UTC+2 (CEST)
- Postal code: 99-100
- Car plates: ELE
- Website: http://www.leczyca.info.pl

Łęczyca (pronounced [wɛnˈt͡ʂɨt͡sa]; in full, the Royal Town of Łęczyca, Polish: Królewskie Miasto Łęczyca; German: Lentschitza; Yiddish: לונטשיץ, romanized: Lintshits, Luntshits) is a town of 13,587 inhabitants in Central Poland. Situated in the Łódź Voivodeship, it is the county seat of the Łęczyca County and a capital of the historical Łęczyca Land.

== Origin of the name ==
The town was probably named for a West Slavic (Lechitic) tribe called the Leczanie, who inhabited central Poland in the early Middle Ages. Some scholars claim, however, that the name is derived from Old Polish łęg, "swampy plain."

In Medieval Latin documents, Łęczyca is called Lonsin, Lucic, Lunciz, Lantsiza, Loncizia, Lonsitia, and Lunchicia. In the early 12th century, Gallus Anonymus called Łęczyca Lucic, and in 1154, Arab geographer Muhammad al-Idrisi named it Nugrada, placing it among other main towns of the Kingdom of Poland such as Kraków, Sieradz, Gniezno, Wrocław, and Santok.

== Location ==
Łęczyca lies in the middle of the county and has an area of 8.95 km^{2} (3.46 square miles). In the past, the town was the capital of the Łęczyca Land, which was later turned into Łęczyca Voivodeship. In the Second Polish Republic and during the period 1945–1975, Łęczyca belonged to Lodz Voivodeship. During the period 1975–1998, it was part of Plock Voivodeship.

The geometric centre of Poland is located near Łęczyca. For centuries, thanks to this central location, it was one of the most important cities in Poland.

== History ==
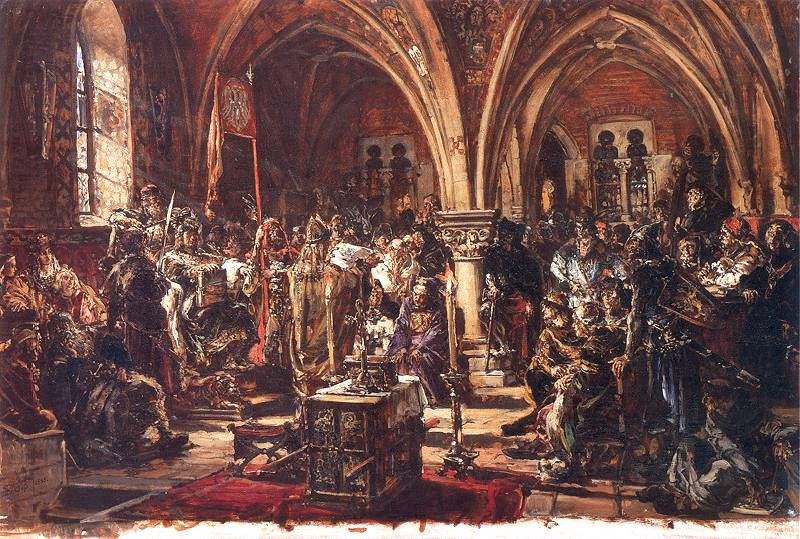
The First Sejm in Łęczyca, by Jan Matejko

=== 11th–13th centuries ===
Łęczyca is one of the oldest Polish cities, mentioned in the 12th century. It was the place of the first recorded meeting of the Sejm, the Polish parliament, in 1180.

In 1229, during the period of fragmentation of Poland, it became the capital of the Duchy of Łęczyca, which in 1263 was split into two parts: the Duchy of Łęczyca, and the Duchy of Sieradz. The city received Magdeburg rights before 1267.

=== 14th century ===
In the early 14th century, Łęczyca Voivodeship was created, with Łęczyca as its capital. This administrative unit of the Kingdom of Poland was part of the larger Greater Poland Province of the Polish Crown and existed until the Partitions of Poland in the late 18th century. Łęczyca was a royal city of the Polish Crown.

In 1331, the Teutonic Knights sacked Łęczyca during one of their repeated incursions into Poland. A considerable number of buildings were burned down, including two churches. A few decades later, on the initiative of Casimir the Great, the city was walled and a Royal Castle built to its southeast. The castle was situated on a small hill, protected by a moat with water from the Bzura river. The complex was made of red brick and set on stone foundations. It was protected by a 10-meter-high wall, with a tower at its southwestern corner. The gate tower was in the western wall, in the basement was a prison, and in the courtyard was a two-storey tenement building that frequently hosted meetings of the Royal Council.

Soon after its completion in the mid-14th century, the castle was named one of the royal residences and the seat of the Starosta of Łęczyca.

=== 15th century ===
In 1406, the Teutonic Knights burned down the Royal Castle, but the complex was rebuilt so quickly that in 1409, King Władysław II Jagiełło attended a meeting of his advisors there, discussing the oncoming war with the Knights. Following the Battle of Grunwald (1410), a number of high-ranking Teutonic prisoners were held at the castle for ransom.

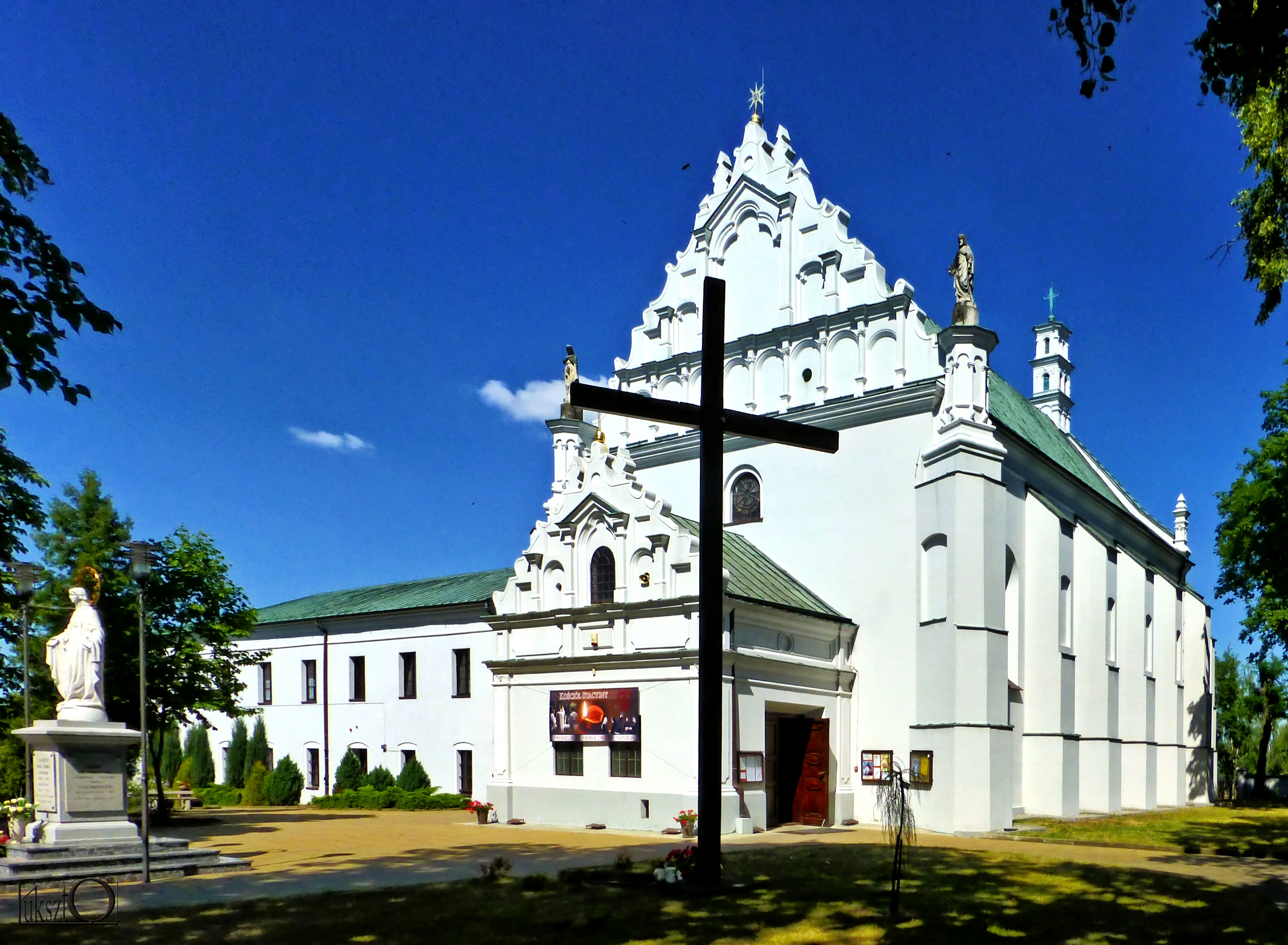
Baroque Church of the Immaculate Conception of Mary

Four sessions of the Sejm (Polish parliament) took place in Łęczyca: in 1420, 1448, 1454, and 1462. In 1420, a Bohemian delegation offered the Czech crown to Jagiełło here. In 1433, the Truce of Łęczyca was signed in the city. In addition, the castle served as the headquarters of King Casimir IV Jagiellon during the Thirteen Years' War (1454–66).

=== Early Modern Period ===
Łęczyca prospered from the mid-14th to the mid-17th centuries. The city's prominence came to an end with the Swedish invasion of Poland, when the castle was overrun and most of the city once again destroyed, and it remained in a state of crisis until the Partitions of the 18th century.

One of two main routes connecting Warsaw and Dresden ran through the town in the 18th century. Kings Augustus II the Strong and Augustus III of Poland often traveled this route.

=== World War II ===
During the German invasion of Poland that started World War II, the Germans executed 29 Poles, including two families, on September 9–10, 1939. Łęczyca was then occupied by Nazi Germany and incorporated into the region known as Reichsgau Wartheland as part of the district (kreis) of Lentschütz (German word for Łęczyca). The Germans expelled 330 Poles from the city in December 1939 and still more Poles in 1940. The Poles were deported to a transit camp in nearby Ozorków, from which young people were then deported to forced labour in Germany, while children and older people were deported to the General Government (German-occupied central Poland). Their homes, shops, and workshops were handed over to German colonists as part of the Lebensraum policy. In January 1942, a forced labor camp was operating in or near Łęczyca.

Jews had been an important part of the population of Łęczyca since the late 1400s. In 1939, the Jewish population exceeded 4000, making up about 30% of the community. The Germans terrorized, pillaged, and humiliated the Jews of Łęczyca from the beginning of the occupation. They established a ghetto in late 1939 and later forbade any Jew to leave it on penalty of death. After the ghetto was enclosed, hunger and typhus ravaged its population. Periodically, hundreds of Jews in the community were expelled to other places, while Jews from other locations were brought to Łęczyca. In April 1942, the remaining Jews, about 1700 people, were sent to the Chełmno extermination camp where they were immediately gassed. The local Poles took over their houses and what meager possessions they left behind.

After the war, Łęczyca was reintegrated into the Polish People's Republic.

== Landmarks ==
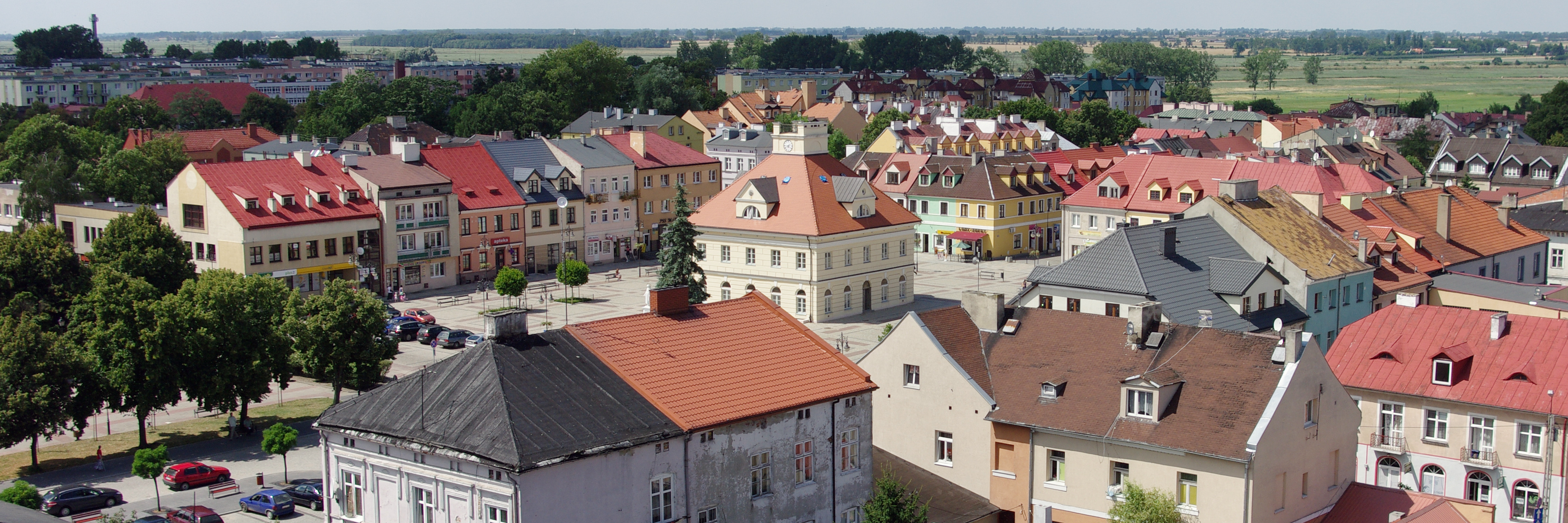
A view from the castle tower

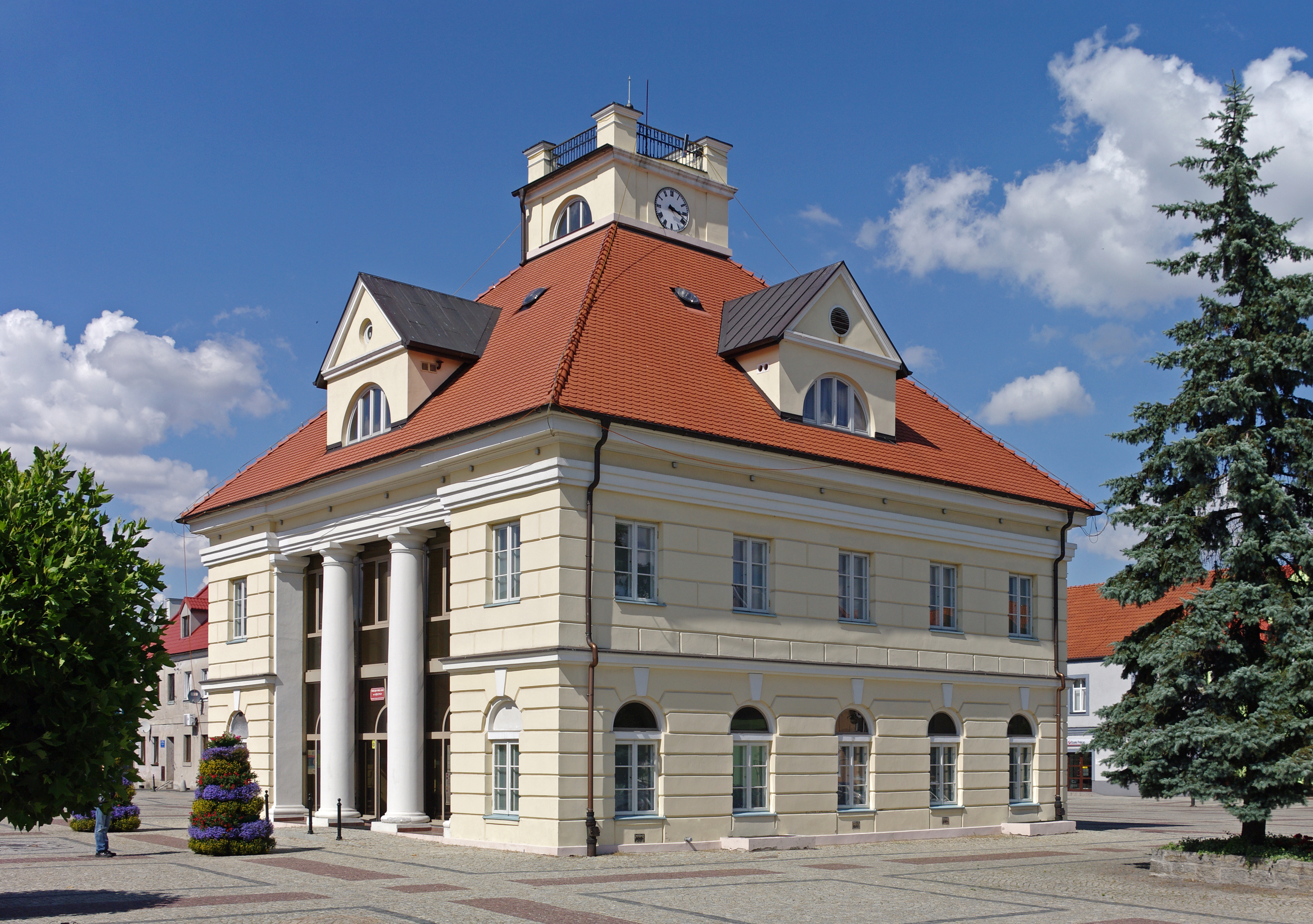
Town hall of Łęczyca

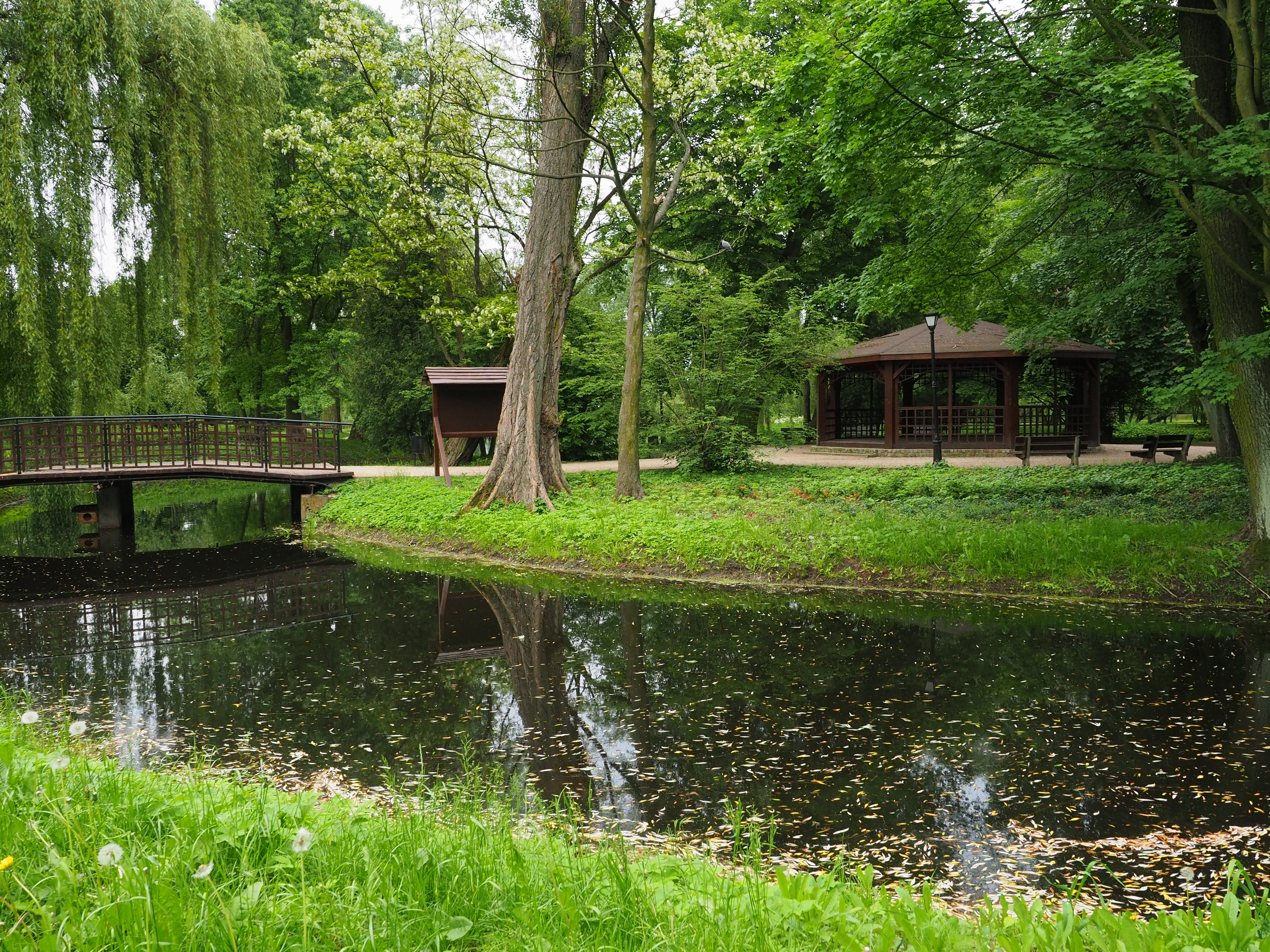
Park Miejski (Municipal Park)

- The Royal Castle, originally dating from the 14th century. In 1964, widespread renovation of the complex began. Another building was added at that time; it now houses the Museum of the Land of Łęczyca.
- The Church of St Andrew the Apostle. The current church was consecrated in 1425.
- Dominican monastery in Ul. Pocztowa, which later served as a prison (1799–2006). Former political internees include Władysław Gomułka and Władysław Frasyniuk.
- The Cistercian church and monastery in ul. Poznańska, built between 1636 and 1643.
- The defensive walls of Łęczyca, some of which are still extant. The original walls enclosed an area of approximately 9 hectares and amounted to 1150 metres in length and 7 metres in height. The town plan is still recognisably that of a medieval town.

A few kilometres away are the Collegiate church and the earthworks at the site of the medieval settlement of Tum.

== Devil Boruta ==
Devil Boruta (Polish: Diabeł Boruta) is a Polish mythological and literary character who is associated with Łęczyca. Originally he was a leshy, a tutelary forest deity in Slavic paganism. After Christianization, he was transformed into a demon whose role it was to corrupt the nobility.

== Sports ==
The local football team is Górnik Łęczyca. It competes in the lower leagues.

== Dukes of Sieradz-Łęczyca ==
- 1228–1232: Henry I the Bearded (Henryk I Brodaty)
- 1232–1233: Konrad of Masovia (Konrad Mazowiecki)
- 1234–1247: Konrad of Masovia (Konrad Mazowiecki)
- 1247–1260: Casimir I of Mazovia (Kazimierz I Mazowiecki)
- 1260–1275: Leszek the Black (Leszek Czarny)
- 1275–1294: Divided into two duchies of Sieradz and Łęczyca (below)
- 1294–1297: Ladislaus I the Short (Władysław Łokietek)
- 1297–1305: Wenceslaus II of Bohemia (Wacław II Czeski)

After 1305, parts of the united Kingdom of Poland were initially formed into two vassal duchies, which were later incorporated as Łęczyca Voivodeship and Sieradz Voivodeship.

== Dukes of Łęczyca ==
- 1233–1234: Konrad of Masovia (Konrad Mazowiecki)
- 1275–1294: Casimir II of Łęczyca (Kazimierz II)
- 1329–1343: Władysław the Hunchback (Władysław Dobrzyński)

After 1305, part of the united Kingdom of Poland as a vassal duchy, later after 1343 incorporated by the king Casimir III the Great as the Łęczyca Voivodeship.

== Notable residents ==
- Jerzy I of Halicz
- Kazimierz II
- Janisław I
- Władysław I the Elbow-high
- Władysław II Jagiełło
- Władysław III of Poland
- Vytenis
- Zygmunt II August
- Agnieszka Baranowska
- Kazimierz Franciszek Czarnkowski
- Zygmunt Grudziński (1870-1929)
- Rabbi Shlomo Ephraim Luntschitz (Lenczyk)
- Rabbi Meïr Löb ben Jehiel Michel Weiser Malbi"m
- Wacław Przeździecki
- Jakub Świnka
- Stanisław Warszycki
- Marek Wojtera
- Józef Szczepański
- Stanisław Thugutt

== Twin towns/sister cities ==
Łęczyca is twinned with four cities:

- (France) Rillieux-la-Pape
- Penzlin, Germany
- Volodymyr, Ukraine
- Rypin, Poland

== See also ==
- Devil Boruta
- Dukes of Sieradz-Łęczyca
- Łęczyca (disambiguation)
