= Zygmunt Grudziński =

Zygmunt Grudziński may refer to:

- Zygmunt Grudziński (1560–1618), Polish nobleman, voivode (ruler) of Rawa
- Zygmunt Grudziński (1568–1653), Polish nobleman, voivode of Innowrocław and Kalisz
- Zygmunt Grudziński (1870–1929), Polish radiologist
