= Tum Collegiate Church =

- Church of St. Mary and St. Alexius
- Polish: Kolegiata w Tumie
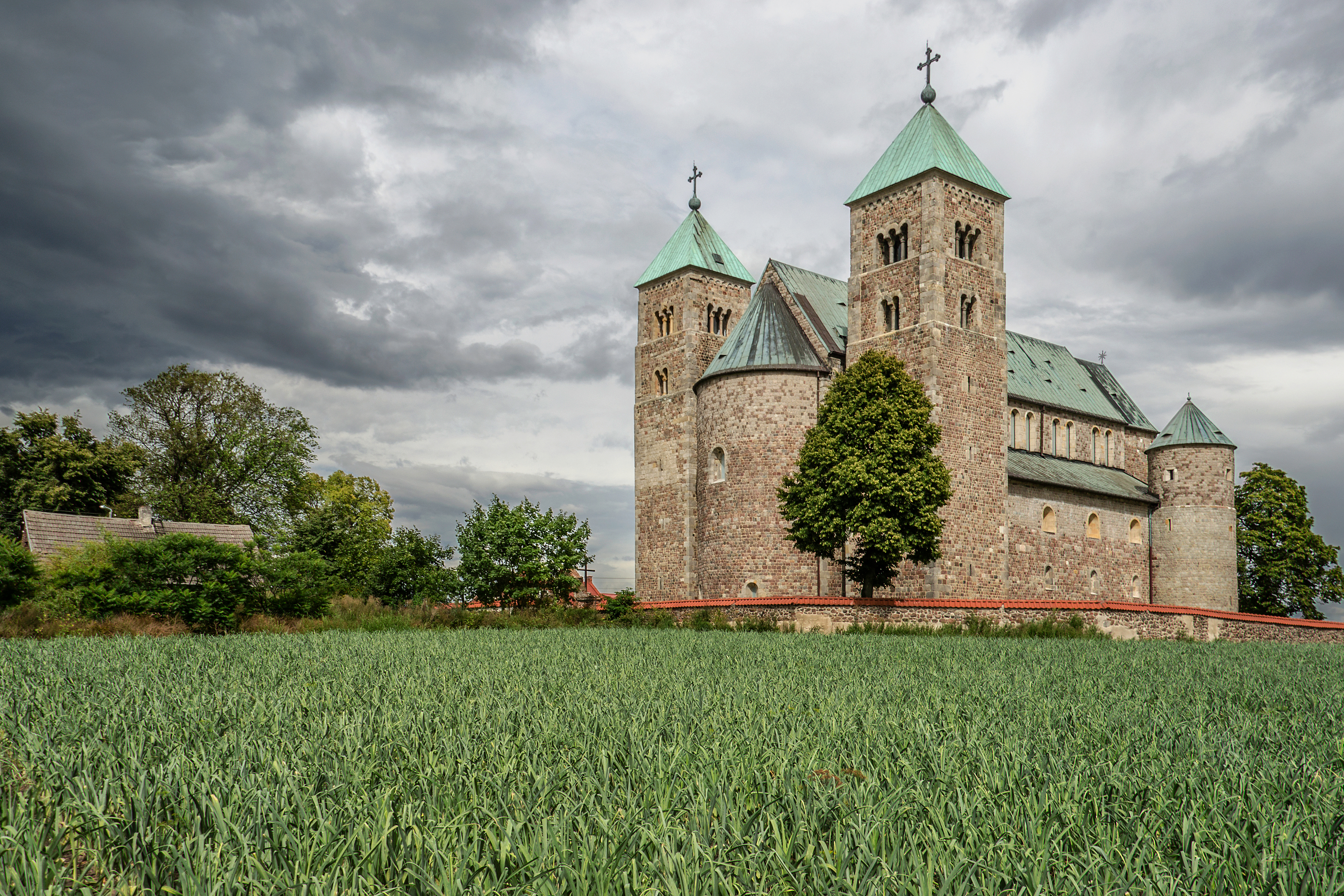
- The church in 2012

- 52°03′22″N 19°13′58″E
- Location: Tum, Łęczyca, Łódź Voivodeship
- Country: Poland
- Denomination: Roman Catholic

History
- Consecrated: 21 May 1161

Architecture
- Style: Romanesque (external)

Administration
- Diocese: Roman Catholic Diocese of Łowicz

Historic Monument of Poland
- Designated: 2022-04-13
- Reference no.: Dz.U. 2022 poz. 808

The Collegiate Church of St. Mary and St. Alexius (Polish: Kolegiata w Tumie) is an encastellated Romanesque church located in the village of Tum near Łęczyca, in central Poland. It was constructed out of granite blocks and sandstone in the mid-12th century.

The church was built using the opus emplectum technique. It has the form of an aisled basilica with galleries, a twin-tower west façade, and two apses (west and east). It was reconstructed in the 15th, 18th and mid-20th centuries; during the latest reconstruction the church returned to its simpler Romanesque form and round turrets at the east were added. The main (north) portal is sculpted and dates back to the first half of 12th century. In 2022, the church was designated an official Polish Historic Monument.

== History ==
=== Medieval ===
The temple stands on top of a holm or islet which was once surrounded by wetlands and marshes. There is evidence from a papal bull issued by Pope Innocent II that a wooden monastery of the early Benedictine Brothers pre dated the church by at least a century. Older excavations and historical analysis suggested that the monastery was founded by Boleslaus I, the first King of Poland, and Saint Adalbert of Prague in approximately 997 AD. However, more recent studies prove that it was most likely founded during the Restoration period, in the second half of the 11th century. The monastery was demolished to make way for the current church.

Historian and painter Władysław Łuszczkiewicz noted that the islet (and the nearby mound) served as a small fortified stronghold, or gord. He justified his claim with the location particulars, as churches would be founded in the vicinity of populated settlements or castles than on isolated land.

The construction was initiated by Janik, Archbishop of Gniezno, in around 1149. According to a legend, the local townsfolk from Łęczyca believed that the dimples in stonework were made by the hands of Devil Boruta, who attempted to destroy the church. The unfinished structure was consecrated on 21 May 1161 by officials and princes.

Tum was the site of 21 provincial synods, beginning in 1181 and ending in 1547.

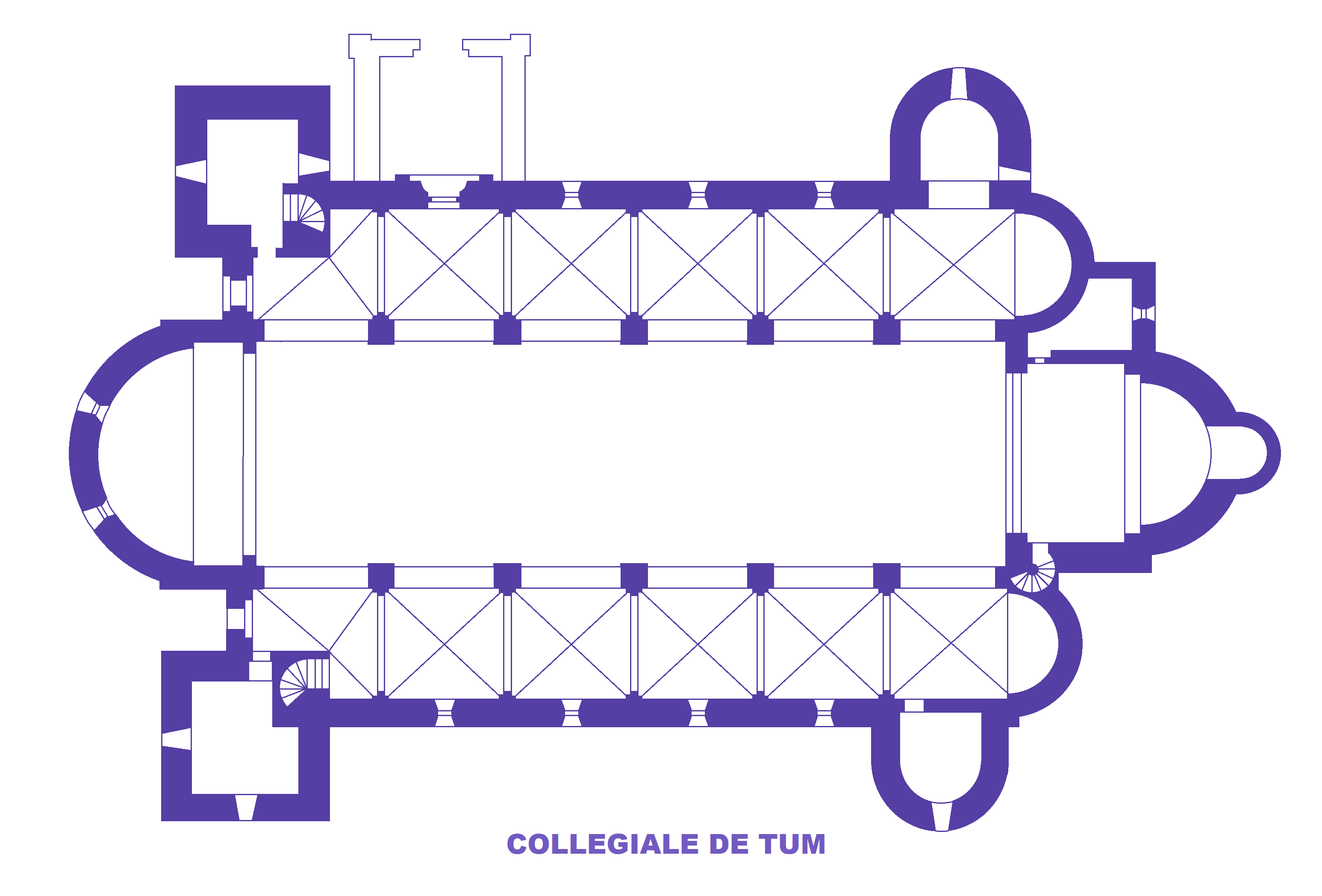
Floor plan

Apart from religious service, the encastellated (fortified) church and its surroundings could harbour local townsfolk from danger and enemy troops. Tum defended itself in 1241 during the first Mongol invasion of Poland, but in c. 1293 the army of Vytenis, the pagan Duke of Lithuania, managed to capture the settlement. Some of the refugees who hid in the church were slaughtered and others were enslaved. The gord (grodzisko) to the southwest of the church was burned and abandoned, though the mound exists to this day.

Throughout the 14th century, the church was being repeatedly pillaged by the Teutonic Knights. Subsequent reconstructions were not in the original Romanesque style, but Gothic (15th century) and later Neoclassical (mid-late 18th century). This architectural versatility could be observed until the Second World War.

=== Contemporary ===
During the Battle of the Bzura in September 1939, a German soldier used the northernmost tower as an observation point and with the intention to direct the German artillery against Polish positions. As a result, the Polish army shelled Tum, thus damaging one of the towers. During the recapture attempt, German Luftwaffe planes bombed the site which caused more destruction to the roof and internal furnishings leaving an empty shell. The original stone outerwalls did survive.

Reconstruction works began in 1947 and were headed by Jan Zachwatowicz and Jan Koszczyc Witkiewicz. The church was rebuilt without the later Gothic or Neoclassical elements, thus returning to its initial Romanesque form. The re-consecration took place in 1961.

The crucifix inside the church was designed in 1943 by Józef Gosławski.

Gallery

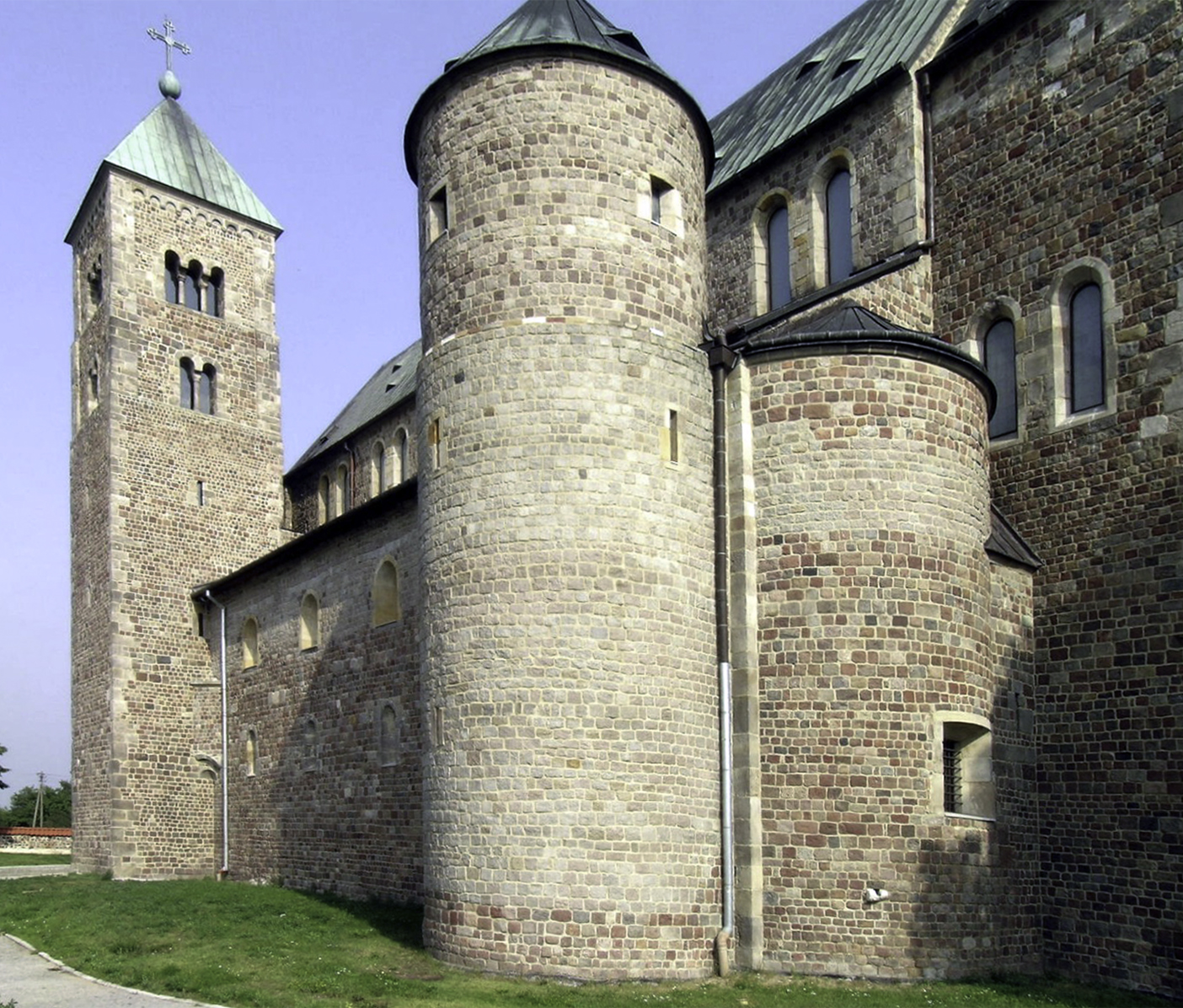
Round turrets

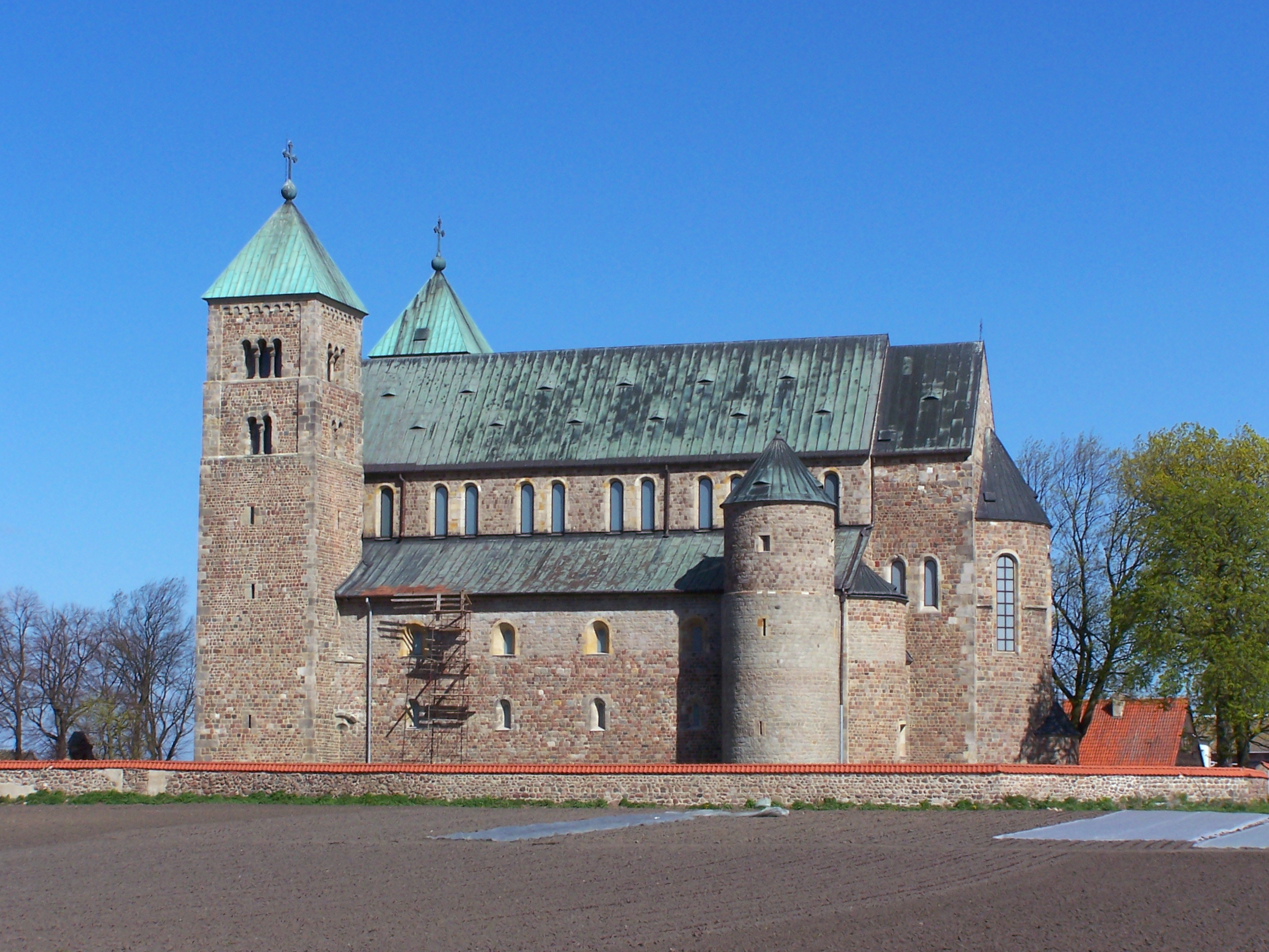
Side view showing the encastellation

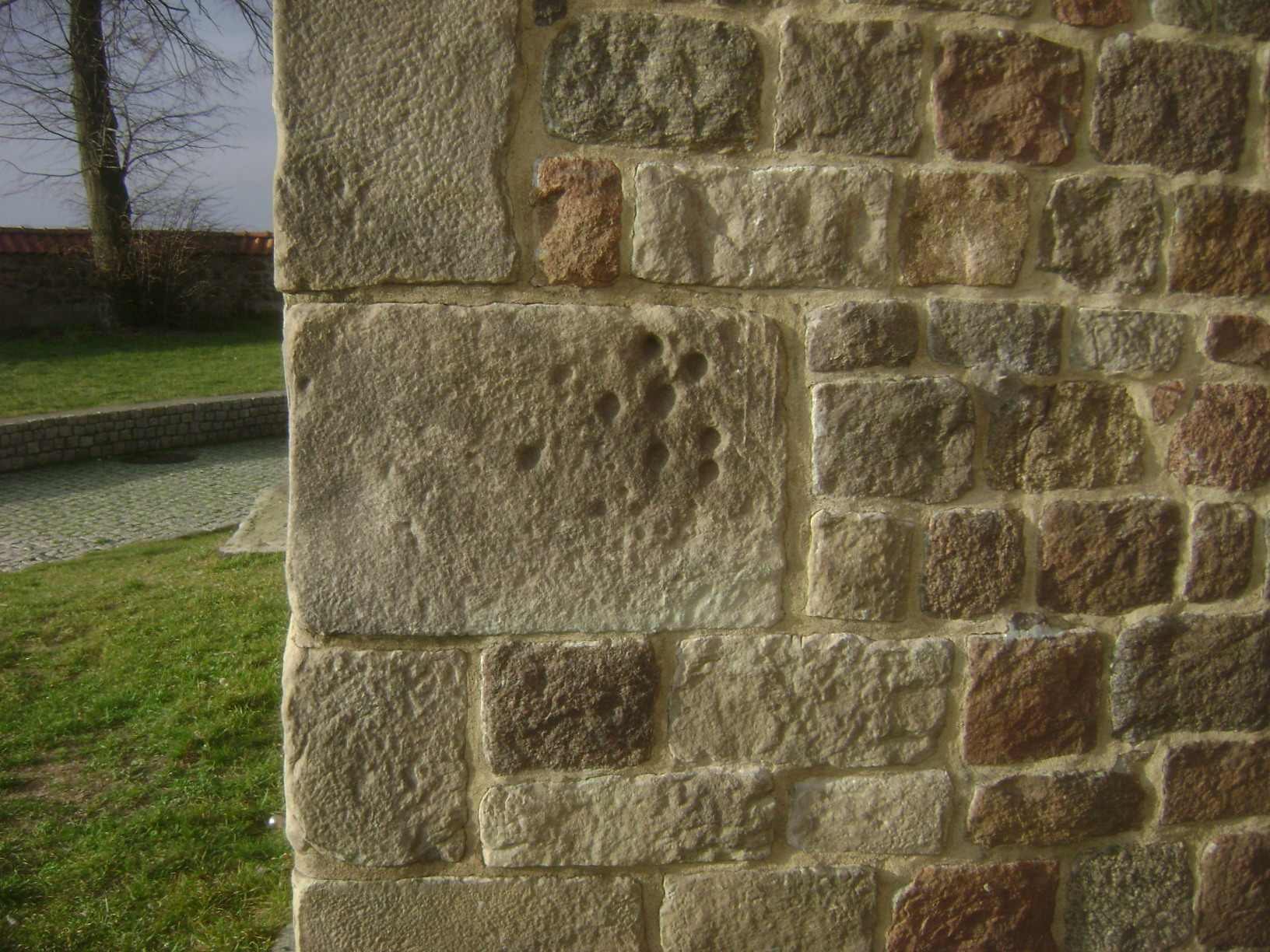
The legendary dimples left by the hands of Devil Boruta

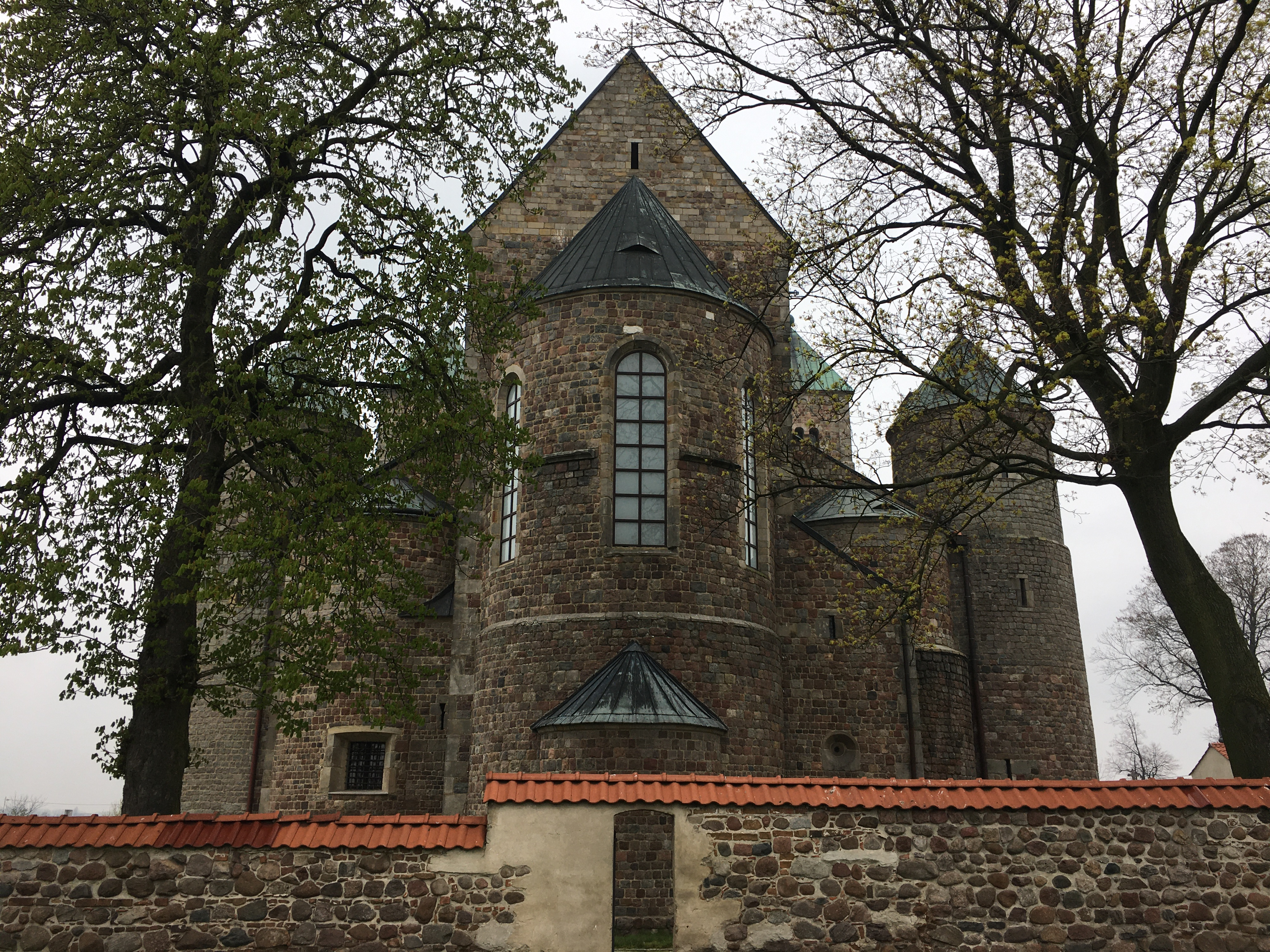
Rear view of the presbyterium

== Bibliography ==
- Rudzka, Anna (2009). Józef Gosławski. Rzeźby, monety, medale (in Polish). Warsaw: Alegoria. ISBN 978-83-62248-00-1.
- Łuszczkiewicz, Władysław (1877). Sprawozdania Komisyi do Badania Historyi Sztuki w Polsce (in Polish). Vol. 1. Kraków: Akademia Umiejętności. OCLC 1150698699.
- Tymieniecki, Kazimierz (1996). Roczniki historyczne (in Polish). Vol. 62. Poznań: Tow. Przyjaciół Nauk.
- "Kolegiata w Tumie". Odkrywaj Polskę. 16 July 2020.
- Tomaszewski, A. (1974). Romańskie kościoły z emporami zachodnimi na obszarze Polski, Czech i Węgier. Wrocław.
- Nowiński, Krzysztof (2003). Polska. Arcydzieła w architekturze. Warszawa (Warsaw): Sport i Turystyka-MUZA SA. ISBN 9788372004475.
