= Statue of Jan Zachwatowicz =

Monument in Warsaw, Poland

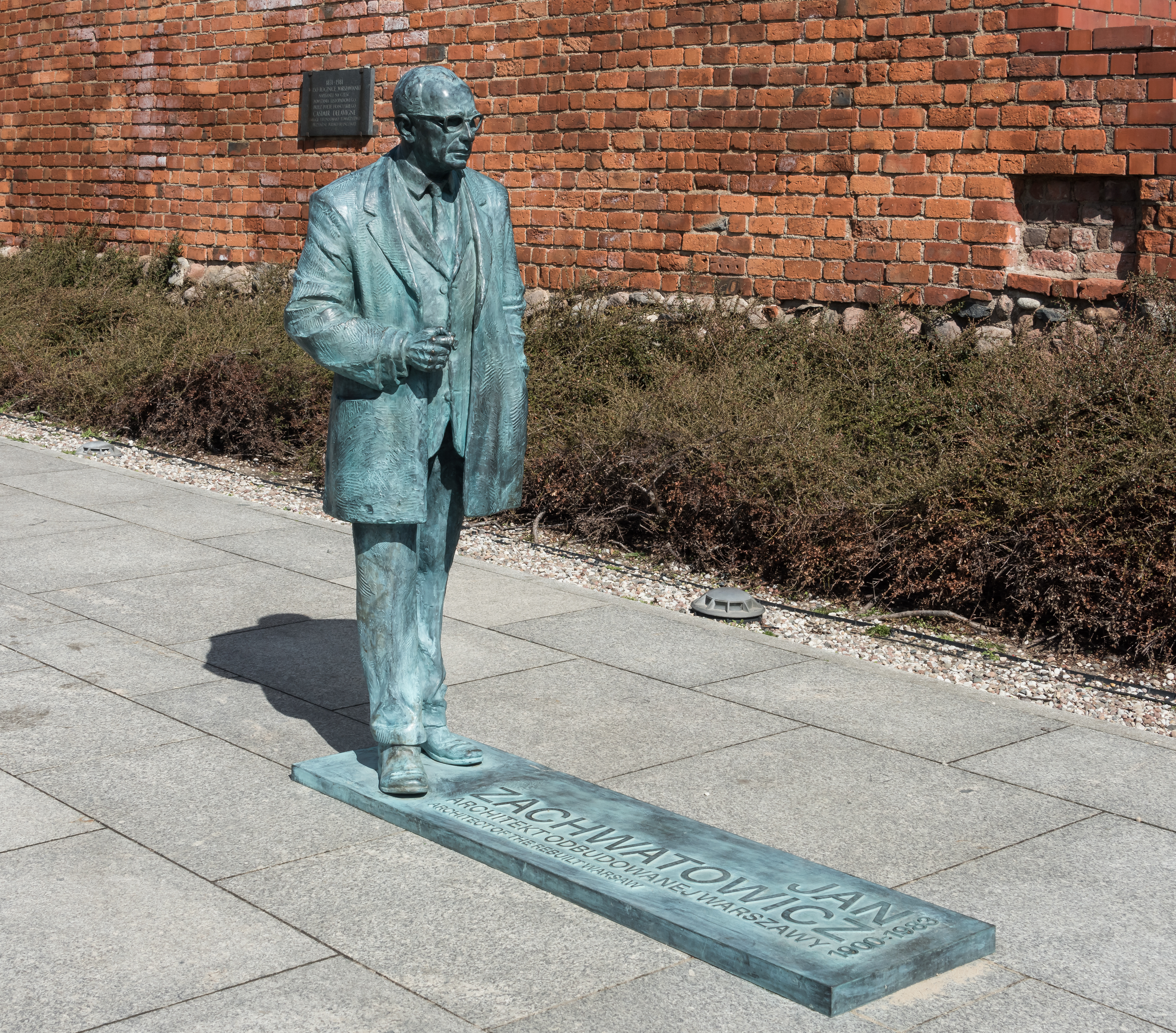
- The monument in 2021.
- Interactive map of Statue of Jan Zachwatowicz
- Location: Castle Square, Downtown, Warsaw, Poland
- Coordinates: 52.247620°N 21.012971°E
- Designer: Karol Badyna
- Type: Statue
- Material: Bronze
- Height: 1.9 m (6 ft 3 in)
- Opening date: 4 March 2021
- Dedicated to: Jan Zachwatowicz

The statue of Jan Zachwatowicz (Polish: Pomnik Jana Zachwatowicza) is a bronze statue in Warsaw, Poland, located in the Old Town neighbourhood of the Downtown district. It is placed at the Castle Square. The monument is dedicated to Jan Zachwatowicz, a 20th-century architect and conservator-restorer who led the effort of reconstruction of Warsaw following its destruction in the Second World War. It was designed by Karol Badyna and unveiled on 4 March 2021.

== History ==
The monument was proposed in 2017 by the Friends of Warsaw Association, to commemorate Jan Zachwatowicz, a 20th-century architect and conservator-restorer who led the effort of reconstruction of Warsaw following its destruction in the Second World War. On 8 December 2020, the Warsaw City Council passed a resolution which approved its construction at the Castle Square. It was designed by sculptor Karol Badyna, and unveiled on 4 March 2021, on the 121st anniversary of Zachwatowicz's birth. The ceremony was held by Rafał Trzaskowski, the city mayor, Ewa Malinowska-Grupińska, the chairperson of the city council, and Krystyna Zachwatowicz-Wajda, Jan Zachwatowicz's daughter.

== Characteristics ==
The monument is placed at the Castle Square, near the begging of Biegański Zwinger, a pathway near the city walls. It consists of a bronze statue of elderly Jan Zachwatowicz. The monument has the total height of 1.9 m. The figure is depicted as if being on a stroll and facing the Royal Castle. It is wearing glasses, a suit and a winter jacked, and has the land right hand in the pocket. The statue is placed on a thin pedestal, which features an inspiration in English and Polish. It says the following:

JAN ZACHWATOWICZ
1900–1983
ARCHITEKT ODBUDOWANEJ WARSZAWY
ARCHITECT OF THE REBUILT WARSAW
