= Łęczyca (disambiguation) =

Łęczyca may refer to the following places in Poland:

- Łęczyca, a town in Łódź Voivodeship
- Łęczyca, Lower Silesian Voivodeship (south-west Poland)
- Łęczyca, Lublin Voivodeship (east Poland)
- Łęczyca, Bełchatów County in Łódź Voivodeship (central Poland)
- Łęczyca, Greater Poland Voivodeship (west-central Poland)
- Łęczyca, Warsaw, a neighbourhood of Warsaw, in Masovian Voivodeship (central Poland)
- Łęczyca, West Pomeranian Voivodeship (north-west Poland)
