= City walls of Warsaw =

Coordinates: 52°14′55.4″N 21°00′37.1″E

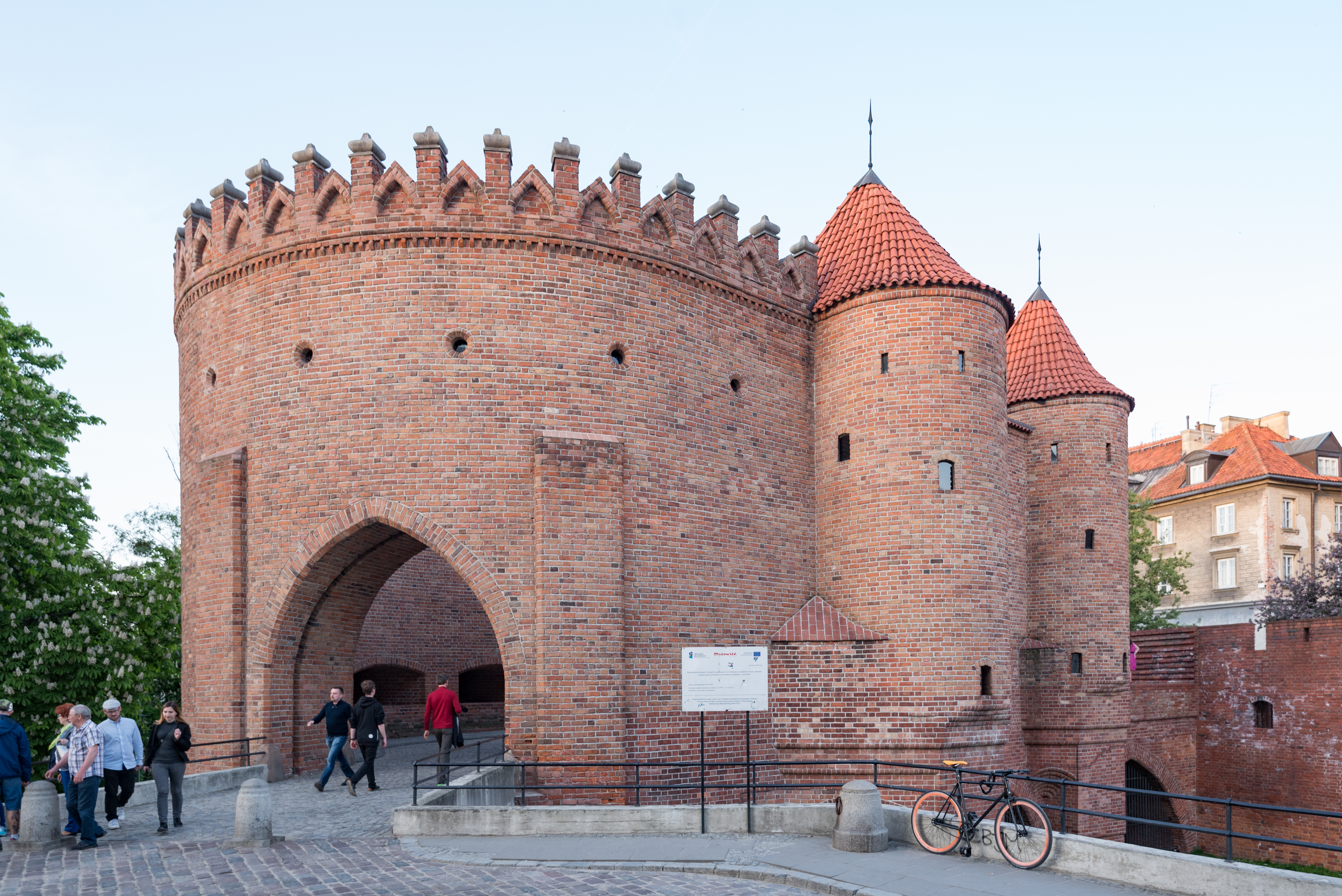
Warsaw Barbican

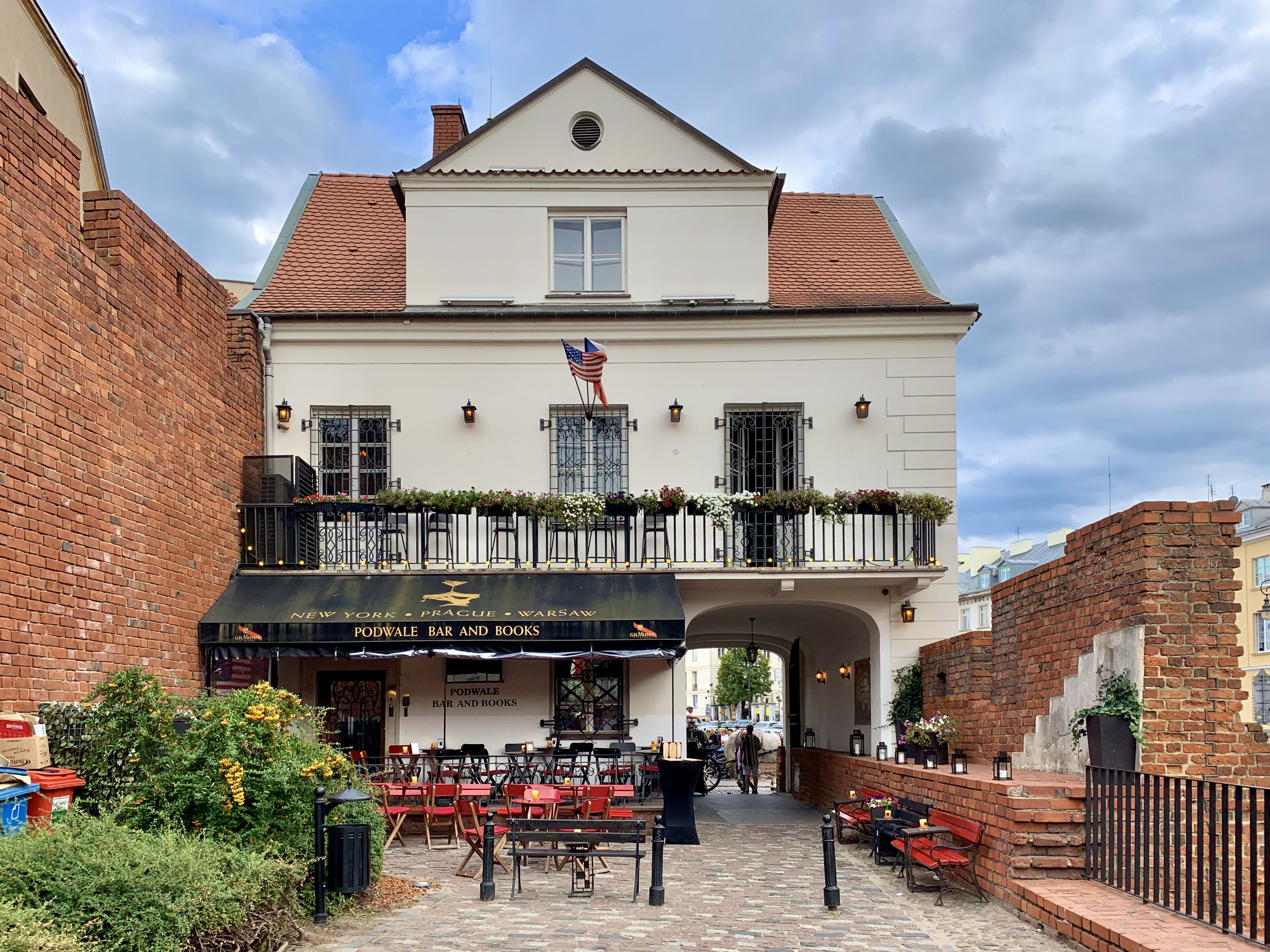
House located in zwinger

The city walls of Warsaw are walls around Warsaw Old Town. They are composed of two lines: inner and outer, with several gates round the city. Originally raised between the 13th and 16th centuries, then rebuilt in 1950–1963, partly later. The best-preserved fragments of the fortification are those parallel to Podwale Street, from the Warsaw Royal Castle to the Barbican and further to the Vistula Embankment.

== History ==
The construction works of the first line of the walls were started probably around 1280. In effect, a 1,200-meter-long (3,900 ft) wall encircled the surface of 8.5 hectares. The fortification included numerous towers and turrets (the majority of them had a rectangular shape). The inner ring was built before 1339. In 1379, as a result of a special privilege, Prince Janusz I the Elder, made the townspeople responsible for the maintenance of the town walls. According to the second privilege (of 1413) between the second half of the 15th century and the beginning of the 16th century, the outer ring was raised. The second line was about 4 meters shorter, yet approximately 0.6 m thicker. The whole construction was surrounded by a 4-meter-deep (13 ft) moat.

The Barbican was designed by Jan Baptist the Venetian and built in 1548. The youngest element of the city’s fortification. Divides the New and Old Towns. Nowadays a major tourist attraction and summer art gallery. Back in the 16th century, it was well equipped for modern warfare.

== Renovation ==
The first attempt of renovation took place in 1936. In October 1938 the uncovered section of the walls was unveiled in a special ceremony. After the World War II reconstruction work proceeded in 1953–1954, however, concerning only some particularly interesting and attractive sections, for example Barbican.

The Barbican houses an exhibition of the Warsaw Museum devoted to its defensive walls.

Warsaw Old Town

== See also ==
- City walls of Gdańsk
- City walls of Tarnów
- Defensive walls of Łęczyca
- Jan Zachwatowicz Monument
