= Marek Wojtera =

Polish politician (1963–2022)

member of Sejm 2005-2007
- In office 25 September 2005 – 2007

Personal details
- Born: 24 November 1963 Łęczyca, Poland
- Died: 30 October 2022 (aged 58)
- Party: Samoobrona

Marek Jacek Wojtera (24 November 1963 – 30 October 2022) was a Polish politician. He was elected to Sejm on 25 September 2005, getting 8715 votes in 11 Sieradz district as a candidate from the Samoobrona Rzeczpospolitej Polskiej list.

Wojtera died on 30 October 2022, at the age of 58.

== See also ==
- Members of Polish Sejm 2005-2007
