= Rokita (folklore) =

Devil in Polish folklore

Rokita (Polish: [rɔˈki.ta]) is a demon in Polish folklore, that is said to inhabit the gateways to the underworld, including the wetlands, forests, and the insides of old willow trees. In some local tales, he is seen as an equivalent of Leshy.
