= Zygmunt Grudziński (1870–1929) =

Polish radiologist

Zygmunt Grudziński (1870–1929) was a Polish radiologist of merit and founder of the "Polski Przeglad Radiologiczny" (Polish Radiological Review). Born in 1870, Łęczyca near Kalisz, died October 24, 1929, Warsaw. One of the foremost Polish radiologists, worked as docent of this discipline at the Warsaw University and was also head of the roentgenological institute at the Spital zur h. Verklärung. His works were published in German, French and Polish.
