= Duke of Sieradz-Łęczyca =

From 1138 to 1228, part of the Duchy of Kraków and Sandomierz, belonging to the high-dukes of Poland.

== Dukes of Sieradz-Łęczyca ==
- 1228–1232 Henry I the Bearded (Henryk I Brodaty)
- 1232–1233 Konrad of Masovia (Konrad Mazowiecki)
- 1234–1247 Konrad of Masovia (Konrad Mazowiecki)
- 1247–1260 Casimir I of Kuyavia (Kazimierz I Mazowiecki)
- 1260–1275 Leszek the Black (Leszek Czarny)
- 1275–1294 divided into two duchies of Sieradz and Lęczyca (see below)
- 1294–1297 Władysław I the Elbow-high (Władysław Łokietek)
- 1297–1305 Wenceslaus II of Bohemia (Wacław II Czeski)

After 1305 parts of the united Kingdom of Poland initially as two vassal duchies, later incorporated as Łęczyca Voivodeship and Sieradz Voivodeship.

== Dukes of Sieradz ==
- 1233–1234 Boleslaus I of Mazovia (Bolesław I Mazowiecki)
- 1275–1288 Leszek the Black (Leszek Czarny)
- 1288–1294 Władysław I the Elbow-high (Władysław Łokietek )
- 1327–1339 Przemysl of Cuiavia (Przemysł Kujawski)

After 1305 part of the united Kingdom of Poland as a vassal duchy, later after 1339 incorporated by the king Casimir III the Great as the Sieradz Voivodeship.

== Dukes of Łęczyca ==
- 1233–1234 Konrad of Masovia (Konrad Mazowiecki)
- 1275–1294 Casimir II of Łęczyca (Kazimierz II)
- 1329–1343 Ladislaus of Dobrzyn (Władysław Dobrzyński)

After 1305 part of the united Kingdom of Poland as a vassal duchy, later after 1343 incorporated by the king Casimir III the Great as the Łęczyca Voivodeship.
