= Łęczyca Castle =

Medieval castle in Łęczyca, Poland

Coordinates: 52°03′31″N 19°12′13″E

Łęczyca Royal Castle
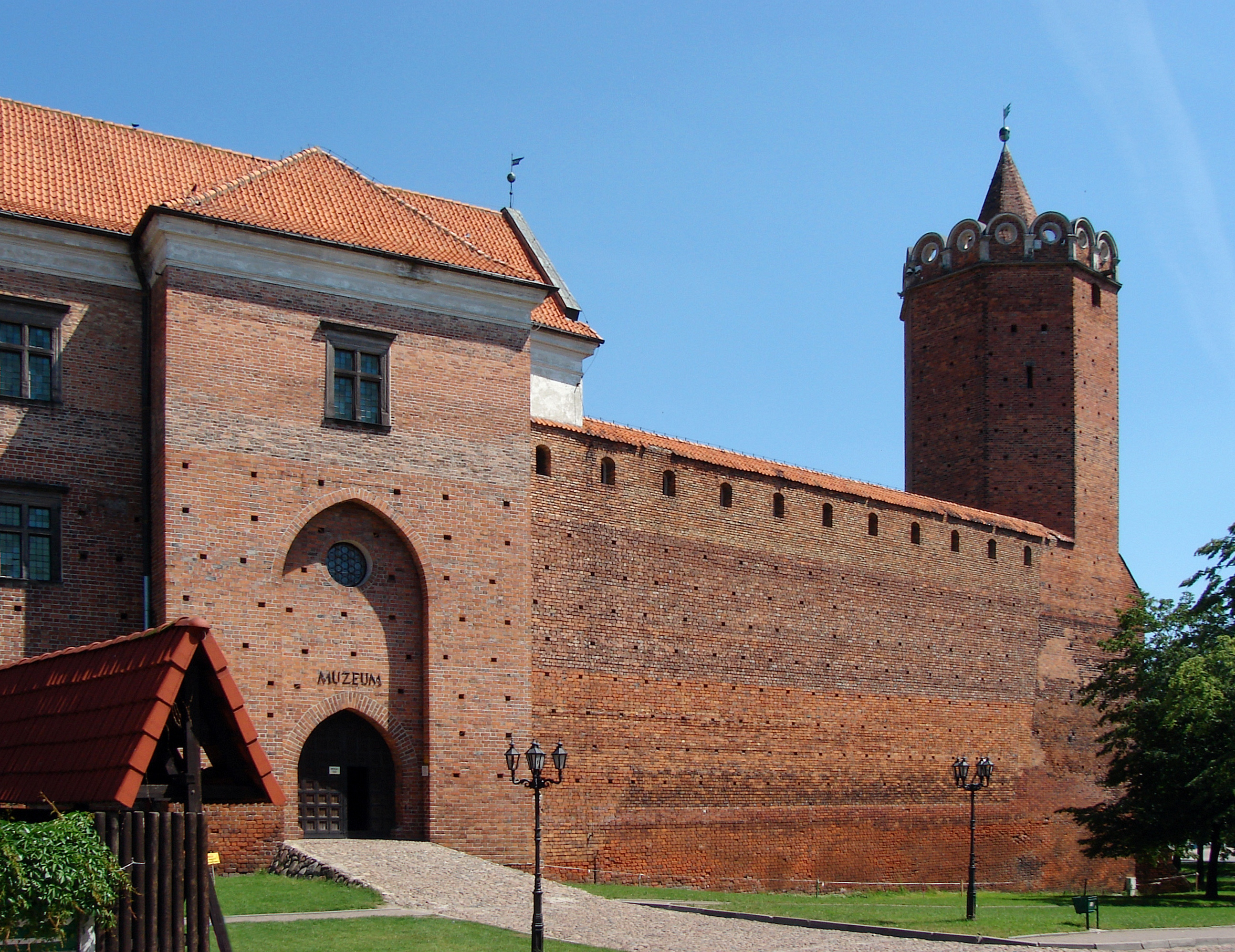
- Interactive map of the Łęczyca Royal Castle area

General information
- Architectural style: Polish Gothic
- Location: Łęczyca, Poland
- Construction started: 1357
- Completed: 1370
- Demolished: 1655, 1707

The Łęczyca Royal Castle is a medieval castle in Łęczyca, Poland, that was erected by Casimir III the Great as a fortification during 1357–1370.

== History ==
Immediately after its completion, the Castle became a residence of king Casimir the Great, and then was the seat of the governor of Łęczyca. In 1406 it was burned by the Teutonic Knights and rebuilt in the following years to serve as a place of a conference in 1409, where decisions were taken in connection with the approaching war with the Order. After the Battle of Grunwald many of the Teutonic Knights were incarcerated here. In subsequent years, four diets were held here (1420, 1448, 1454 and 1462), and the castle became the seat of the king Casimir IV Jagiellon during another war with the Order (1454-1466).

After a great fire in the second half of the 15th century the castle remained in ruins till the early 1560s. Then, in 1563–1565, Jan Lutomirski, Grand Treasurer of the Crown completely rebuilt the castle. The cost of the entire project amounted to nearly 3,000 florins, derived from the royal treasury. The disasters that struck the stronghold in the first half of the 17th century helped the Swedish General Robert Douglas, Count of Skenninge to take the castle, which was defended by starosta Jakub Olbrycht Szczawiński, during the Deluge in 1655. The destruction was completed in 1707 during another Swedish occupation.

Over the next years local residents used the remains of the castle as a source of building materials. After the World War II, the castle became the seat of the scout troop, and in 1964 reconstruction started.

== See also ==
- Castles in Poland
