= Defensive walls of Łęczyca =

The defensive walls of Łęczyca are walls constructed around the small, but once strategically important Polish town of Łęczyca. They were built by Kazimierz Wielki also known as Casimir III the Great, who reigned as the King of Poland from 1333 to 1370. The walls were built in the years 1350-1370. In 1793 the Prussians decided to transform Łęczyca into a fortress. Napoleon's armies maintained the fortress until the Austrians started to demolish the fortifications in 1809. By 1820 moats were filled and the biggest part of the walls was dismantled. The brick was used in the construction of houses. The original walls enclosed an area of approximately 9 hectares, amounted to 1150 metres in length and 7 metres in height.

== Description ==
The defensive walls were built on stone foundations with bricks, varying in thickness between 1.5 and 2 meters. They were crowned with crenellation. Their perimeter had the shape of a rectangle with rounded corners. There were two gates: Poznańska from the West and Krakowska from the South. They were placed in short, quadrate tower gates. One could enter by walking through the small bridges over the moat, which were probably drawbridges. Later, instead of making the Poznańska gate taller (which was very common intervention in the Middle Ages) citizens of Łęczyca built another gate next to it. Krakowska was not changed.

There was a castle in the south-eastern corner of Łęczyca, which was connected with the city. But its task was not defense but observation of the entrance from the South. T. Poklewski-Koziełł suggests that, like other royal castles, it was supposed to protect the officials before the townspeople. In reality, castle was protected by the town, not in other way around.

The area of the town within the defensive walls was 9 hectares and the length of the fortifications was 1150 metres.

In 1603 in the south-western part of the circuit the Monastery of Norbertine Sisters was added to the walls. Also in the 16th century the crenellation was converted into an indoor porch. The line of fortifications was strengthened by 9 towers on the north, east and south sides of the castle. The towers are spaced at intervals of 50–60 meters. ^{[5]} The only tower preserved to this day has been converted into the belfry of St. Andrzej. Its shape is square and it is totally closed. There is a rare element of urban fortifications in its southern wall- 14th-century stairs whose thickness is equivalent to the thickness of the defensive walls. It was the connection between the combat walkway and the lower floor of tower. Originally the tower did not have a direct exit on the outside and was the strongest point of defense.

Over the centuries the ramparts were repeatedly damaged and periodically repaired. In the second half of 16th-century foreman Jan Lutomierski remodeled the culmination of the walls on the eastern part. The new gate, called Wodna, was built and led to a ‘przygródek’, another defensive enclosure. The defensive walls of Łęczyca, the castle and the whole city were destroyed during the Swedish Deluge. In 1793 the Prussians decided to transform Łęczyca into a fortress. Napoleon's armies was maintaining the fortress until the Austrians started to demolish the fortifications in 1809. In 1820 moats were filled and then the biggest part of the walls was dismantled. The brick was used to construction of houses. Except for one tower, to this day, only a few sections of the walls used in construction of the monastery have been preserved.
