= Krystyna Zachwatowicz =

Polish scenographer, costume designer and actress

Krystyna Zachwatowicz-Wajda
- Krystyna Anna Zachwatowicz-Wajda
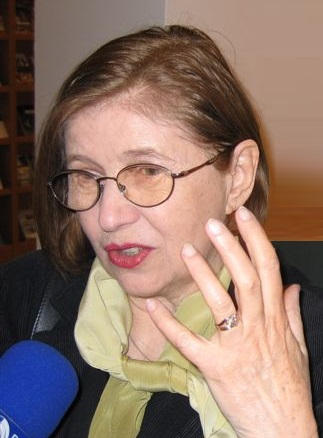
- Zachwatowicz-Wajda in 2005
- Born: Krystyna Zachwatowicz; 16 May 1930 (age 96); Warsaw, Poland
- Education: Jagiellonian University; Jan Matejko Academy of Fine Arts
- Occupations: Scenographer, costume designer, actress
- Spouse: Andrzej Wajda (m. 1974; died 2016)
- Father: Jan Zachwatowicz
- Awards: City of Kraków Award

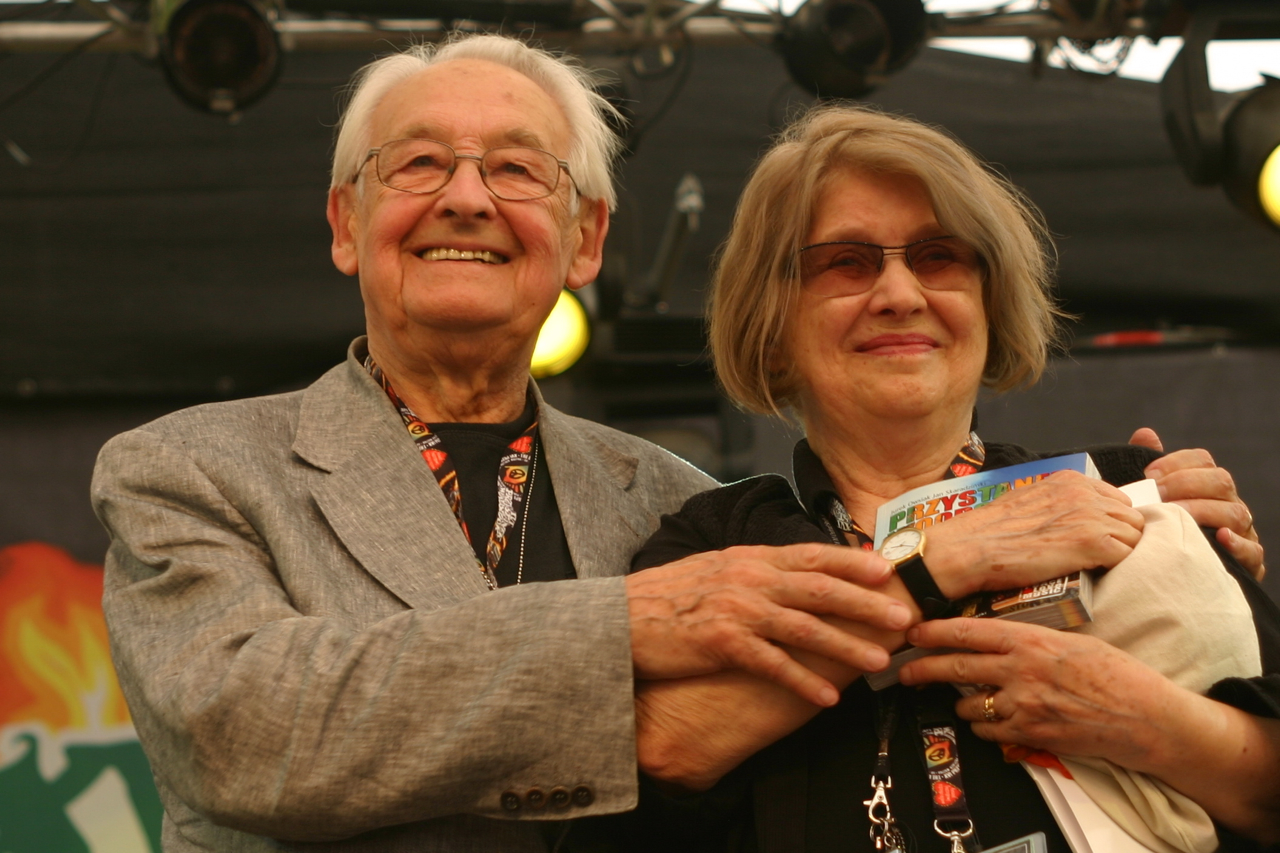
Krystyna Zachwatowicz with her husband Andrzej Wajda (2010)

Krystyna Zachwatowicz-Wajda (born Krystyna Zachwatowicz; 16 May 1930) is a Polish scenographer, costume designer and actress. She is a daughter of architect and restorer Jan Zachwatowicz and Maria Chodźko h. Kościesza, and the widow of film director Andrzej Wajda. Member of the Polish Film Academy.

She is a co-founder (with Andrzej Wajda) of the Manggha Centre of Japanese Art and Technology in Kraków.

== Biography ==
Zachwatowicz was born on 16 May 1930 in Warsaw, Poland. She graduated from the History of Art Faculty of the Jagiellonian University in Kraków (1952) and Scenography faculty of the Academy of Fine Arts in Kraków (1958).

In 1958, she made her own debut as a scenographer in Marin Držić's Rzymska kurtyzana on the stage of Teatr Zagłębia in Sosnowiec. In 1960, she moved to Sosnowiec, where she was associated with student's theatre of the Silesian University of Technology in Gliwice. There, she designed a scenography to Witold Gombrowicz's The Marriage (Polish: Ślub) directed by Jerzy Jarocki. Zachwatowicz cooperated with Jarocki also in other theatre productions: Stanisław Ignacy Witkiewicz's The Mother (1964, 1972; Polish: Matka) and The Shoemakers (1971; Polish: Szewcy) at The Old Theatre in Kraków. In The Old Theatre, she made set designs to several performances directed by Konrad Swinarski, i.e.: Zygmunt Krasiński's The Un-Divine Comedy (1965; Polish: Nie-Boska Komedia), William Shakespeare's A Midsummer Night's Dream (1970) and to plays directed by Andrzej Wajda: Stanisław Wyspiański's November Night (1974; Polish: Noc listopadowa), Fyodor Dostoevsky's Crime and Punishment (1984), and William Shakespeare's Hamlet IV (1989).

From 1958 to the 1970s, Zachwatowicz was an actress of Kraków's Piwnica pod Baranami, where she created a legendary portrait of "the first naive" (Polish: pierwsza naiwna). She cooperated with other theatres in Poland such as: The Groteska Puppet, Mask and Actor Theatre and The Ludowy Theatre in Kraków; with Dramatyczny Theatre and Polish Theatre in Warsaw, and in Wrocław with Polish Theatre.

== Awards ==
- 1994: Silver Medal Cracoviae Marenti for contribution in Kraków, for founding Manggha (with Andrzej Wajda and Karolina Lanckorońska).
- 1995: Golden Laurel of Przekrój "for the second Japan" (with Andrzej Wajda).
- 1999: Knight's Cross of The Order of Polonia Restituta.
- 2003: Polish Film Awards nominee (with Magdalena Biedrzycka) in category of Costume Design for The Revenge.
