= Tum, Poland =

Tum
- Village
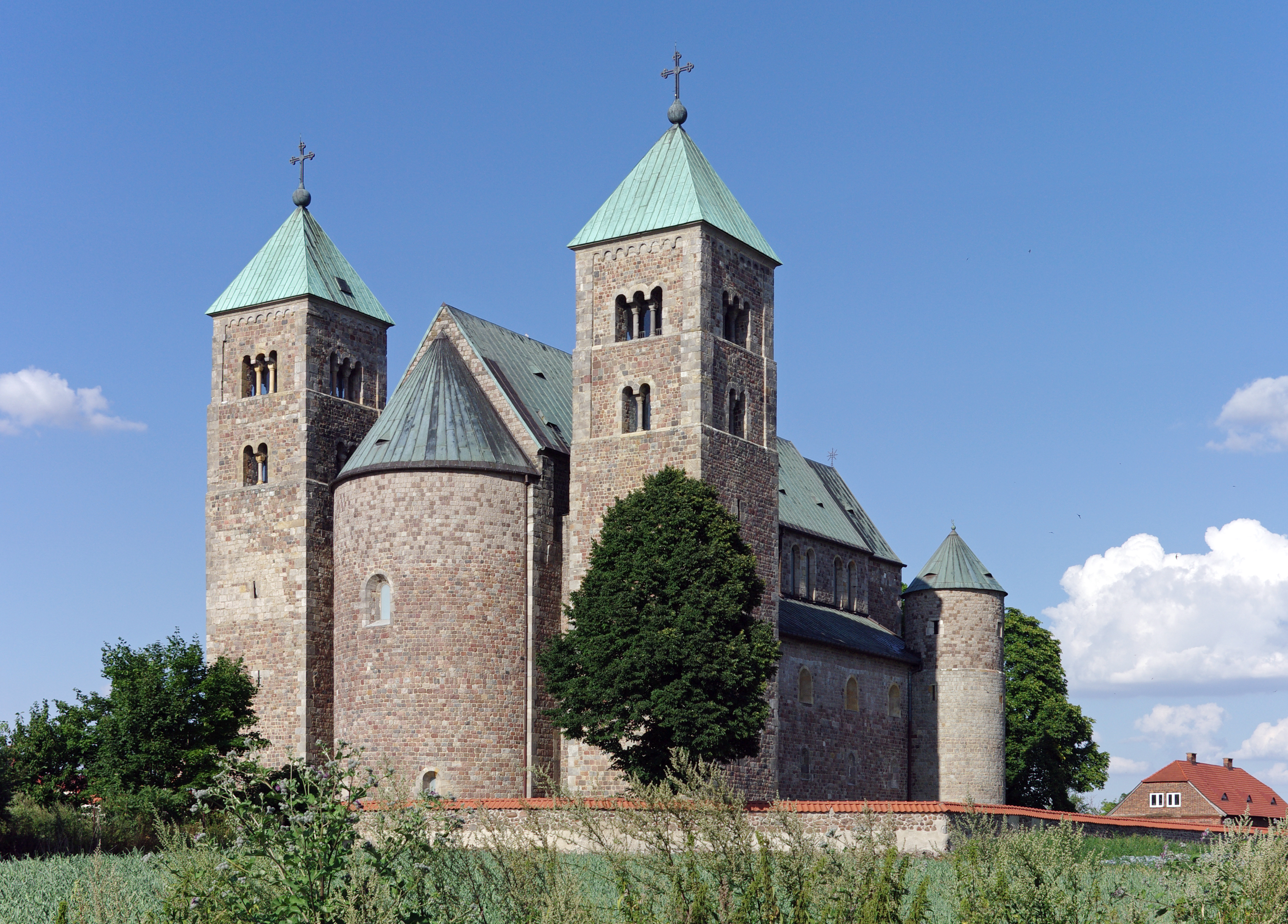
- Tum Collegiate Church from the 12th century

- Location within Poland
- Coordinates: 52°3′21″N 19°13′58″E
- Country: Poland
- Voivodeship: Łódź
- County: Łęczyca
- Gmina: Góra Świętej Małgorzaty
- Population (approx.): 600

Tum [tum] is a village in the administrative district of Gmina Góra Świętej Małgorzaty, within Łęczyca County, Łódź Voivodeship, in central Poland. The village has an approximate population of 600.

Tum is the site of a 12th-century Romanesque Collegiate Church as well as a wooden church of Saint Nicholas from the 18th century. On the western edge of the village there are also remains of an early medieval stronghold dating back to the 6th-8th century, which fell into disuse in the 14th century, following the rise of the nearby town of Łęczyca. The stronghold, located about 2 kilometres (1.2 mi) east of the late-medieval town site, was itself known as Łęczyca until then.
