= Jan Zachwatowicz =

Polish architect, architectural historian, restorer

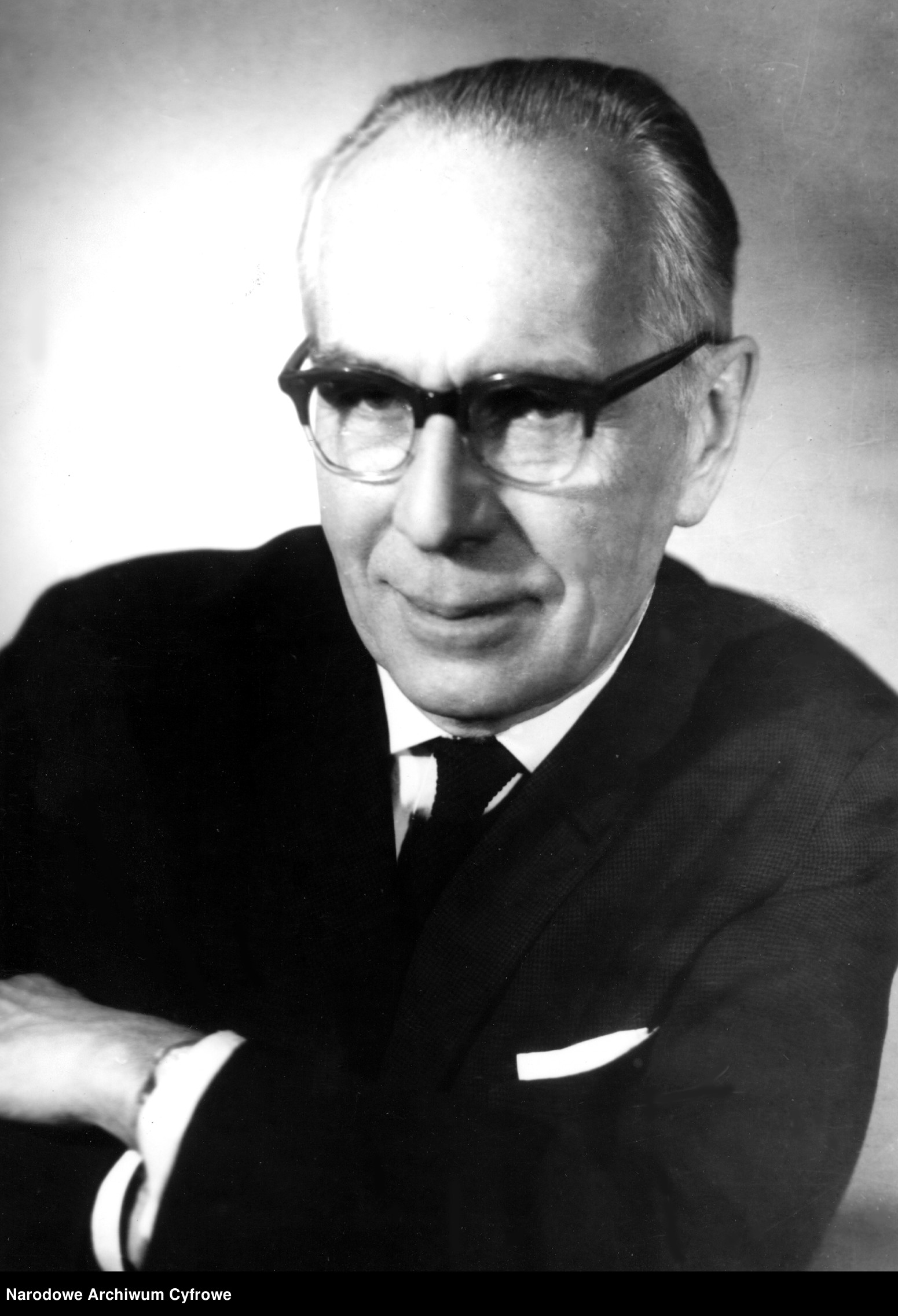
- Jan Zachwatowicz in 1968
- Born: March 4, 1900; Gatchina, Saint Petersburg Governorate, Russian Empire
- Died: August 18, 1983 (aged 83); Warsaw, Polish People's Republic
- Resting place: Powązki Cemetery
- Citizenship: Poland
- Education: Warsaw University of Technology
- Occupation: Architect
- Children: Krystyna and Katarzyna
- Awards: SARP Honorary Award, Karl Friedrich Schinkel Ring
- Practice: Warsaw Reconstruction Office
- Buildings: St. John's Archcathedral, Warsaw, Royal Castle, Warsaw
- Projects: Rebuilding of Warsaw and its Old Town

Jan Zachwatowicz (4 March 1900 – 18 August 1983) was a Polish architect, architectural historian, and restorer. He is notable for being the creator of the Blue Shield cultural heritage symbol.

== Biography ==
Zachwatowicz was born in Gatchina. He studied Industrial Civil Engineering at the Saint Petersburg Polytechnical University, and graduated from the School of Architecture at the Warsaw University of Technology in 1930. He was awarded with the SARP Honorary Award (1971; Polish: Honorowa Nagroda Stowarzyszenie Architektów Polskich).

He was a professor of the Warsaw University of Technology (since 1946; he worked there since 1925), member of the Polish Academy of Sciences (since 1952), member of the Académie d'architecture in Paris (since 1967), member of the International Council on Monuments and Sites, general restorer of relics in Poland (from 1945 to 1957; Polish: Generalny Konserwator Zabytków), chairman of the Architectural-Restoration Committee (since 1971; Polish: Komisja Architektoniczno-Konserwatorska), and chairman of the Civil Committee of Royal Castle in Warsaw Reconstruction (Polish: Obywatelski Komitet Odbudowy Zamku Królewskiego w Warszawie).

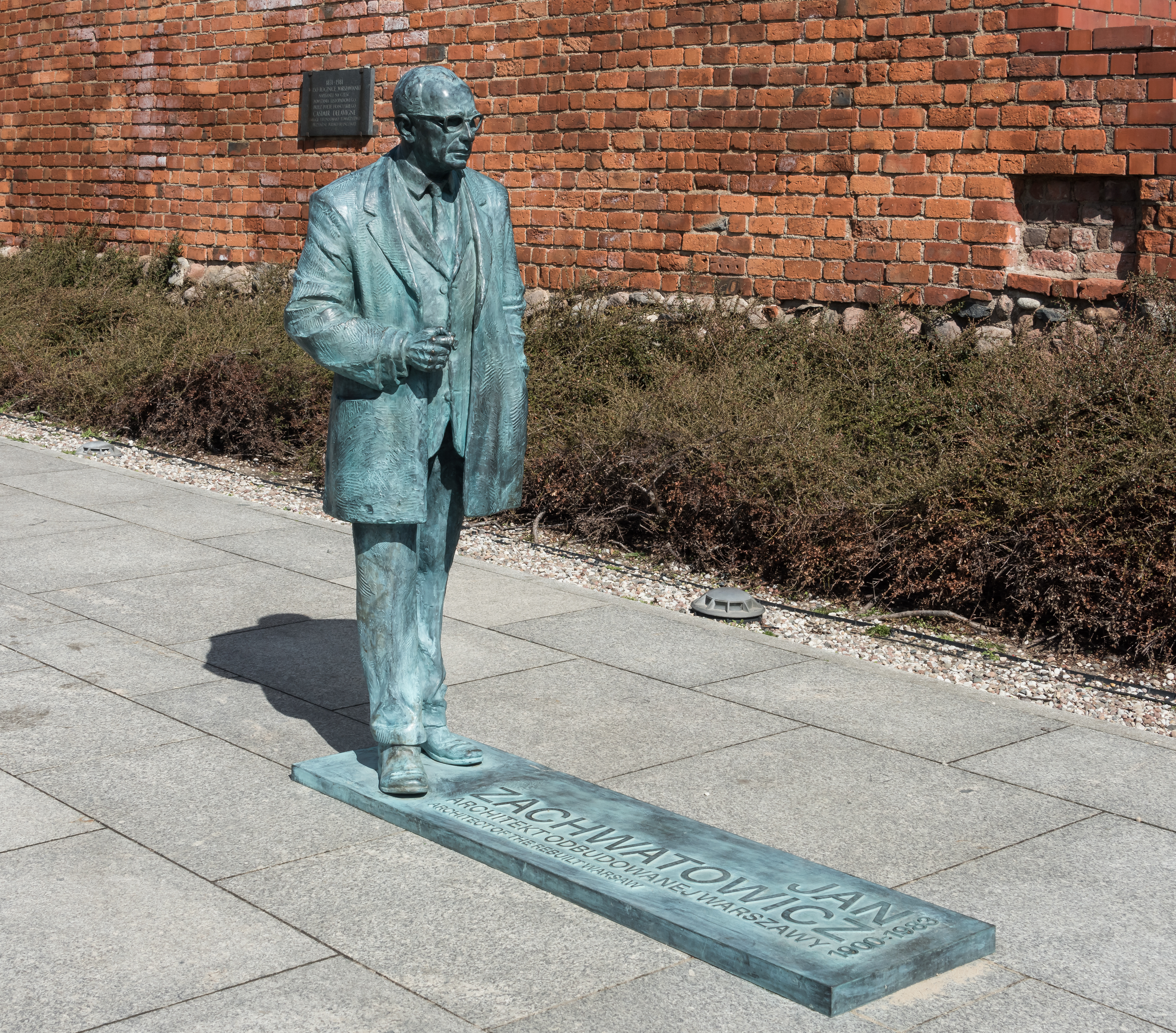
Zachwatowicz monument in Warsaw

Zachwatowicz contributed to reorganization and enlargement of the Polish restoration service. During the occupation of Poland (1939–1945) he took part in teaching, protecting and saving works, i.e. set of relic buildings measurements (including The Market Square of Warsaw Old Town). From January 1945 he co-directed the Warsaw Reconstruction Office (Polish: Biuro Odbudowy Stolicy; f. Biuro Organizacji Odbudowy Warszawy).

After World War II, many other historic buildings in Gdańsk, Poznań, and Wrocław were restored or rebuilt according to principles established by Zachwatowicz and his team. Among his many achievements was the rebuilding of St. John's Cathedral, Warsaw (1960).

He was a scholar with over 200 major publications to his credit.

He was the father of Krystyna and Katarzyna Zachwatowicz. He died in Warsaw, aged 83.

== Selected works ==
- Ochrona Zabytków w Polsce (1965)
- Architektura polska (1966)
- Sztuka polska przedromańska i romańska do schyłku XIII wieku (1971; collective work)
- Zamek Królewski w Warszawie (1972)

== See also ==
- Blue Shield International
