= History of Warsaw =

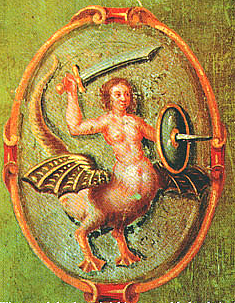
1659 image of the Warsaw Siren

The history of Warsaw spans over 1400 years. In that time, the city evolved from a cluster of villages to the capital of a major European power, the Polish–Lithuanian Commonwealth—and, under the patronage of its kings, a center of enlightenment and otherwise unknown tolerance. Fortified settlements founded in the 9th century form the core of the city, in today's Warsaw Old Town.

The city has had a particularly tumultuous history for a European city. It experienced numerous plagues, invasions, and devastating fires. The most destructive events include the Deluge, the Great Northern War (1702, 1704, 1705), War of the Polish Succession, Warsaw Uprising (1794), Battle of Praga and the Massacre of Praga inhabitants, November Uprising, January Uprising, World War I, Siege of Warsaw (1939) and aerial bombardment—and the Warsaw Ghetto Uprising, Warsaw Uprising (after which the German occupiers razed the city).

The city has hosted many crucial events in the history of Poland. It was the site of election of Polish kings, meeting of Polish parliament (Sejm), and events such as the Polish victory over the Bolsheviks at the Vistula, during the Battle of Warsaw (1920). In recent years the history-laden city has grown to become the multicultural capital of a modern European state and a major commercial and cultural centre of Central Europe.

== Early history ==
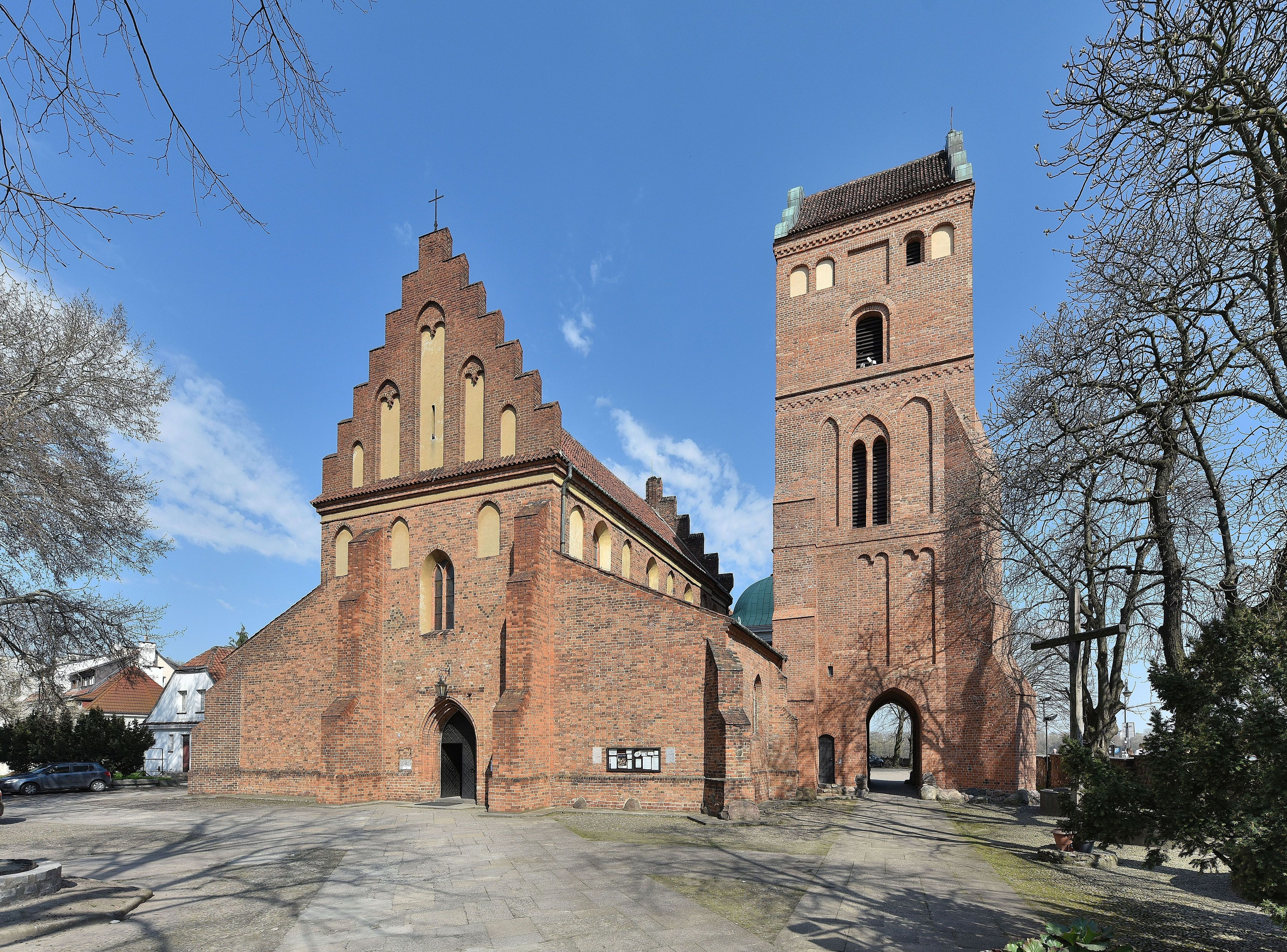
1411 St. Mary's Church in Warsaw New Town.

The first fortified settlements on the site of today's Warsaw were Bródno (9th or 10th century), Kamion (11th century) and Jazdów (12th or 13th century). Bródno was a small settlement in the north-eastern part of today's Warsaw, burned about 1040 during the uprising of Miecław, one of the Mazovian local princes. Kamion was established about 1065 close to the today's Warszawa Wschodnia station (today, Kamionek estate), Jazdów—before 1250 by the today's Sejm. Jazdów was raided twice—in 1262 by Lithuanians, in 1281 by the Płock Prince Bolesław II of Masovia. Then, a new similar settlement was established on the site of a small fishing village called Warszowa, c. 3.5 kilometres (2.2 mi) north of Jazdów—by the same Prince Bolesław II. The Bolesław's brother and successor, Konrad II, built a wooden castellan, which was burned—again by the Lithuanians. On this place, the prince ordered the building of a brick church, which obtained the name of St. John and became a cathedral.

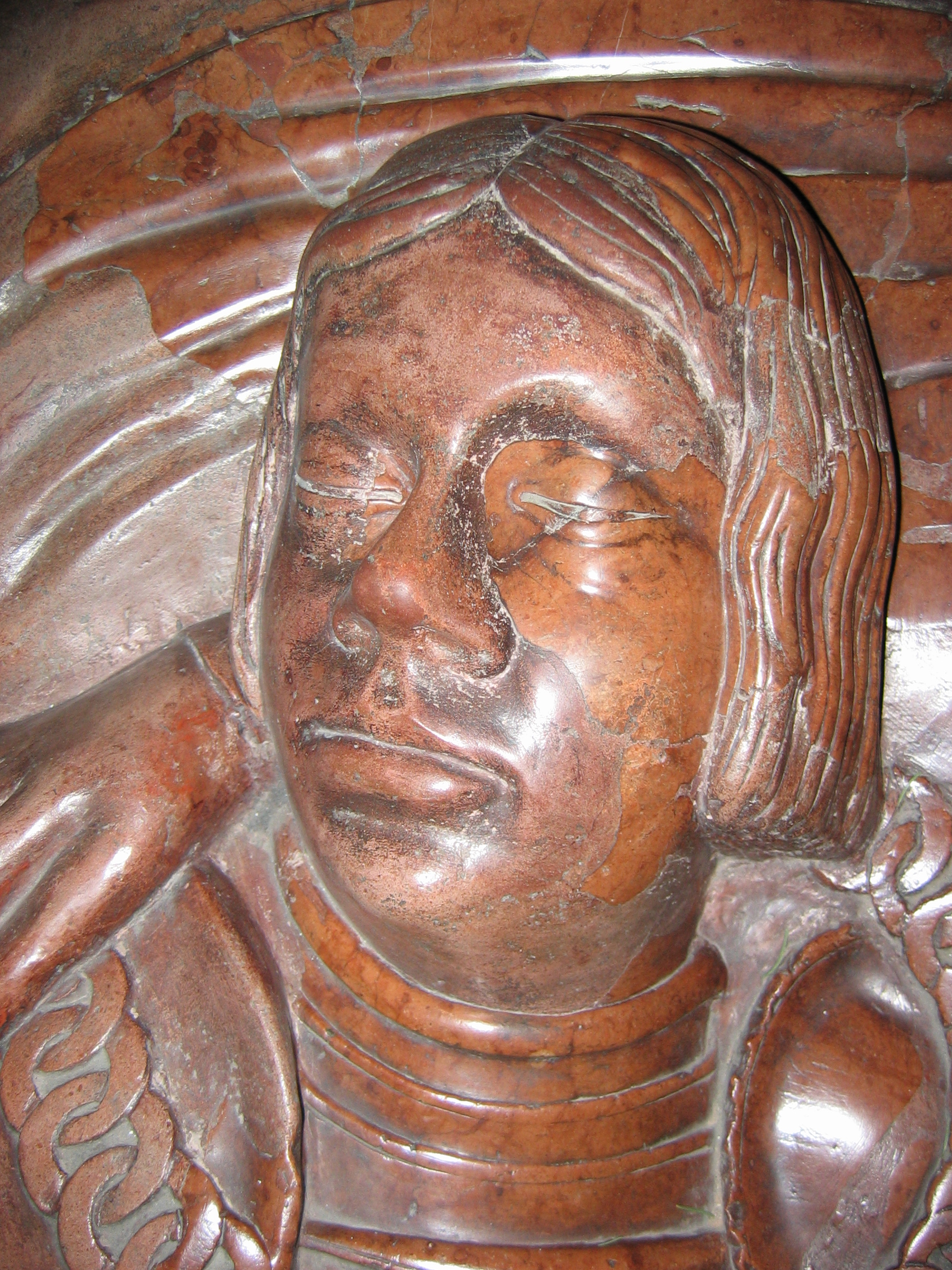
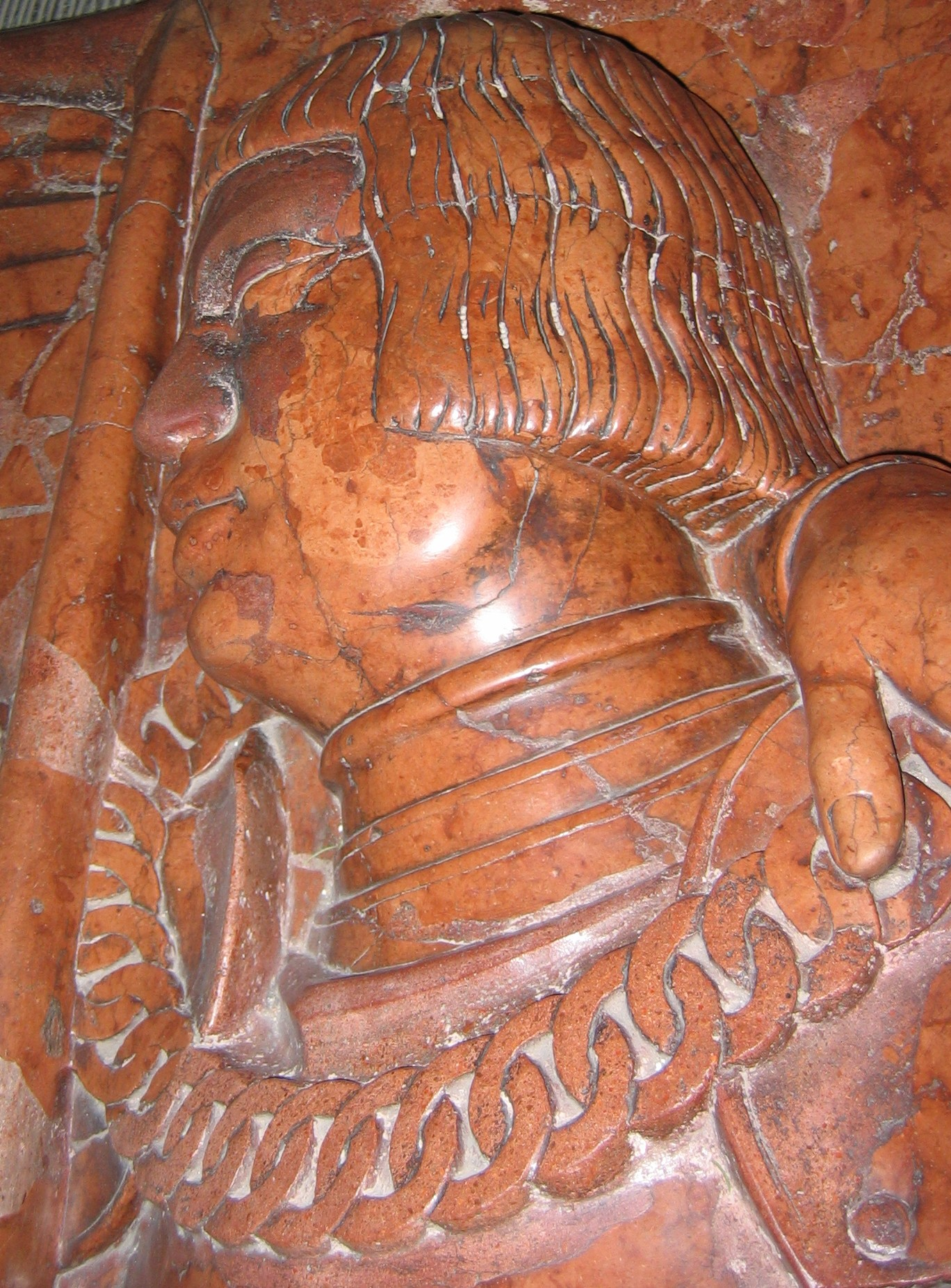
Recumbent effigies of Duke Janusz III of Masovia (left) and Stanisław I of Masovia (right) in Warsaw's St. John's Cathedral. Commissioned in 1526 by Princess Anna of Masovia and executed by Bernardino de Gianotis between 1528 and 1530 (reconstructed, 1966).

The first historical document attesting to the existence of a Warsaw castellan dates to 1313. Fuller information about the age of the city is contained in the court case against the Teutonic Knights, which took place in Warsaw cathedral in 1339. In the beginning of the 14th century it became one of the seats of the Dukes of Masovia, becoming the capital of Masovia in 1413 (Prince Janusz II). Warsaw's economy of the 14th century rested on crafts and trade. The townsmen, of uniform nationality at the time, were marked by a great disparity in their financial status. At the top were the rich patricians while the plebeians formed the lower strata.

At that time, Warsaw housed about 4500 people. In the 15th century, the town spread beyond the northern town wall, and a settlement, New Town, began. The existing settlement became known as Old Town. Each had its own town charter and government. The aim of establishing a new town was to regulate the settling of new people who weren't allowed to settle in Old Town (mainly Jews).

In 1515, during the Muscovy-Lithuanian War, fire (probably lit by Russian agents) burned a large part of Old Warsaw. Gross social inequality and wealth disparity led in 1525 to the first revolt of the poor of Warsaw against the rich and their abuse of power. This struggle resulted in the so-called third order being added to the city's authorities, sharing power with the two bodies controlled by the patrician class: the council and the assessors. The story of Warsaw's struggle for social liberation dates from this time.

Upon the extinction of the local ducal line, the duchy was reincorporated into the Polish Crown in 1526 (according to gossip, the last Mazovian prince, Janusz III, was poisoned on the orders of the Polish queen, Bona Sforza, and King Sigismund I).

== 1529–1699 ==
In 1529, Warsaw for the first time became the seat of the General Sejm, where it has remained ever since. To house the Sejm, an Italian architect, Giovanni di Quadro, was contracted to rebuild the King's Castle in the Renaissance style. The incorporation of Mazovia into the Polish Crown led to fast economic development, as illustrated by the rapid growth of the population to 20,000 people compared to c. 4500 people a century earlier.

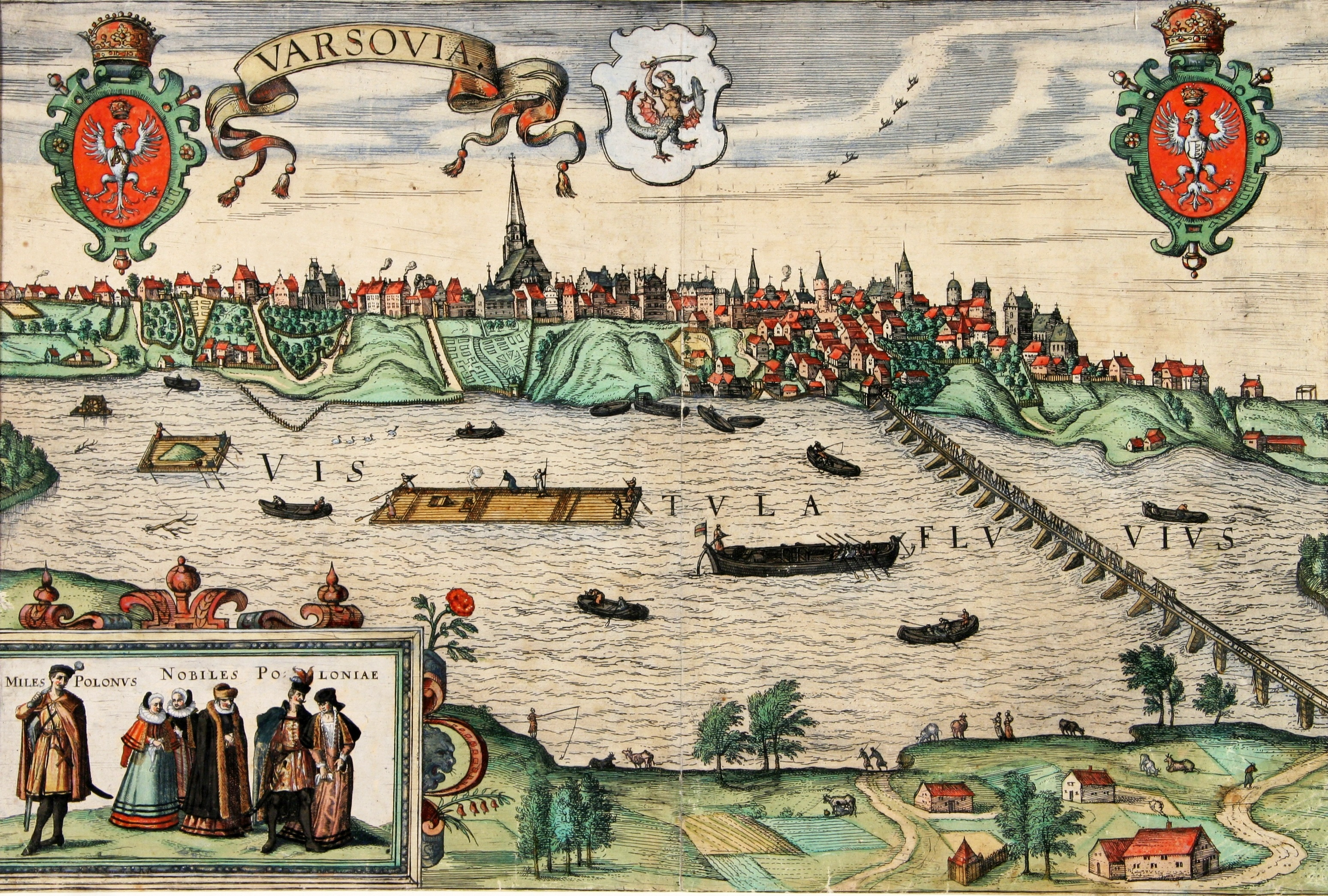
View of Warsaw near the end of the 16th century, by Frans Hogenberg

However, by 1575 (when Stephen Báthory became the Polish king), assemblies were held in another Warsovian suburb at Wielka Wola (now the city's western district, Wola). The stormiest elections were those of 1575 and 1587, when matters came to blows between the divided nobles. Following an election, the king-elect was obliged to sign the pacta conventa (Latin: "agreed accords"), laundry lists of campaign promises, seldom fulfilled, with his noble electors. The agreements included "King Henry's Articles" (artykuły henrykowskie), first imposed on Prince Henri de Valois (in Polish, Henryk Walezy) at the outset of his brief reign (upon the death of his brother, French King Charles IX, Henri de Valois fled Poland by night to claim the French throne).

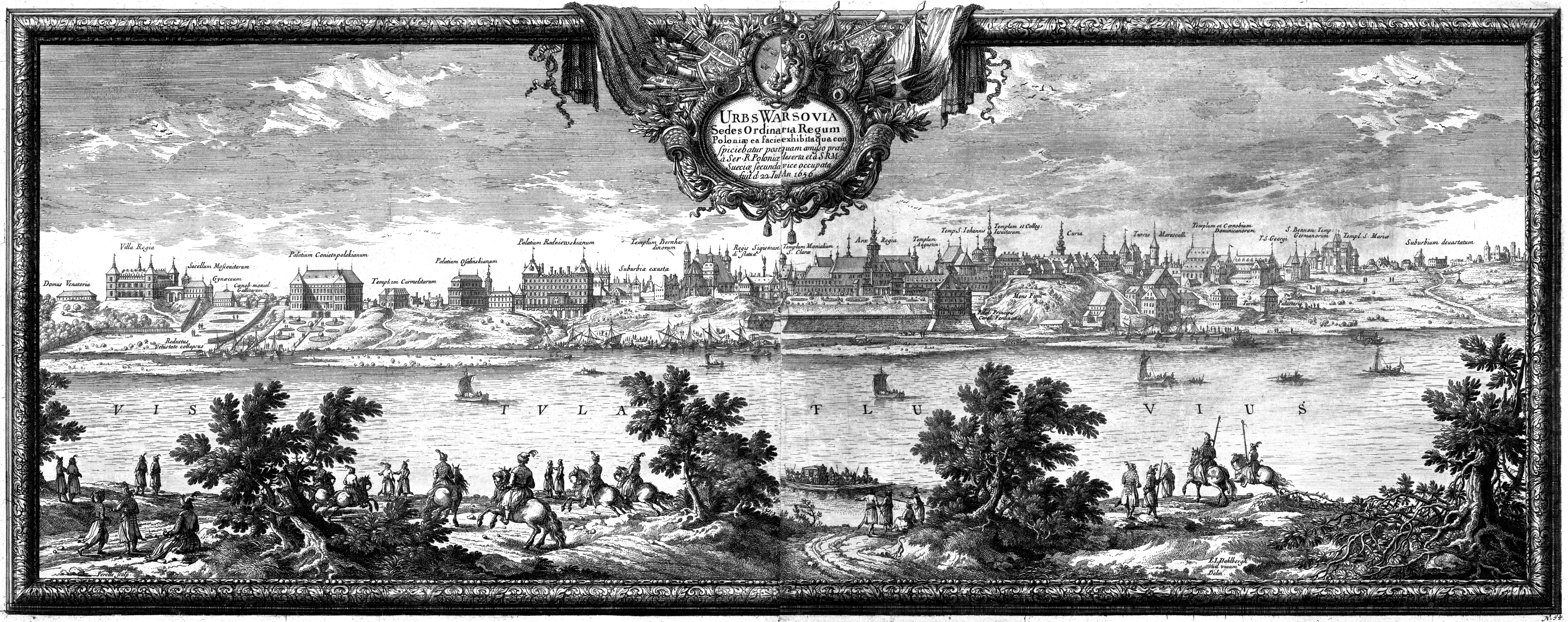
View of Warsaw in 1656 by Erik Dahlbergh

Due to its central location between the Polish–Lithuanian Commonwealth's capitals of Kraków and Vilnius, as well as its relative closeness to Gdańsk, from where Sweden was always threatening, Warsaw became the capital of the Commonwealth and at the same time of the Polish Crown in 1596, when King Sigismund III Vasa moved the court from Kraków. The King's decision had been brought forward by the fire of Cracovian Wawel Castle. The royal architect, Santa Gucci, started to rebuild the Warsovian Castle in the Baroque style, so the King only lived there temporarily, but in 1611 he moved there for good. At the time of Warsaw's transformation from one of the main Polish towns into the country's capital, it already numbered some 14,000 inhabitants. The old walled city had 169 houses; the new Warsaw outside the walls numbered 204 houses, while the suburbs had as many as 320. In 1576, the first permanent bridge was built on the Vistula; it was destroyed in 1603 by an ice floe and until 1775 there was no permanent connection between Warsaw and Praga on the Vistula's right bank.

In the following years, the town expanded into the suburbs. Several private independent districts were established, the property of aristocrats and the gentry, which were ruled by their own laws. Such districts were called jurydyka. They were settled by craftsmen and tradesmen. One of these “jurydykas” was Praga, which granted a city charter in 1648. The peak of their development came in the wake of Warsaw's revival after the Swedish invasion, which had seriously ravaged the city. Three times between 1655 and 1658 the city was under siege and three times it was taken and pillaged by the Swedish, Brandenburgian and Transylvanian forces. They stole many valuable books, pictures, sculptures and other works of art - mainly, the Swedish troops. The mid-17th-century architecture of the Old and New Towns survived until Nazi invasion. The style was late Renaissance with Gothic ground floors preserved from the fire of 1607. In the 17th and early part of the 18th century, during the rule of the great nobles oligarchy, magnificent Baroque residences rose all around Warsaw. In 1677, King John III Sobieski started to build his Baroque residence in Wilanów, a village c. 10 kilometres (6.2 mi) south of Old Town.

In 1647, benefiting from Poland's tolerance, Valerianus Magnus publicly performed a vacuum experiment (Torricelli's experiment), which contradicted official European science.

In the 17th century, Warsaw became a significant destination for the migration of Armenians, Scots, and Italians, including from other parts of Poland. It was one of the largest Italian and Scottish communities in Poland, and in 1691 Scottish immigrant Alexander Chalmers was even elected mayor of the Old Town. Since 1672, the Armenian community of Warsaw gained importance and grew, as many Armenians fled there from Podolia during the Polish–Ottoman War of 1672–1676. Warsaw has become the most important center of Armenians in Poland outside the area of their main settlement in southeastern Poland. Four Polish Armenians were mayors of the Old Town. In the 18th century, there was an Armenian Catholic chapel at the St. John's Collegiate Church.

== 1700–1795 ==
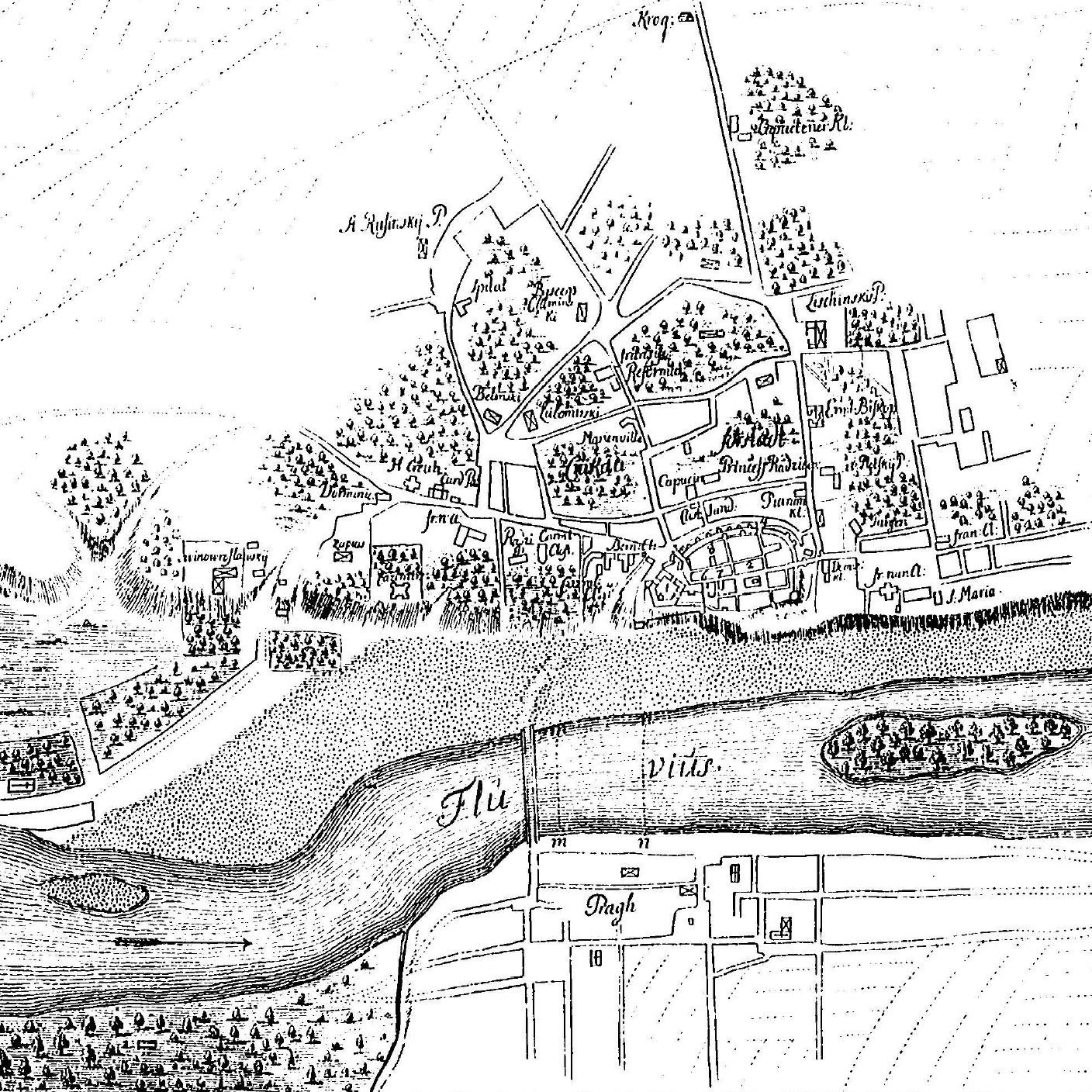
1705 map from Theatrum Europeanum.

Warsaw jurydykas

Warsaw jurydykas (2nd half of the 18th century): 1. Old Town; 2. New Town; 3. Szymanowska; 4. Wielądka; 5. Parysowska; 6. Świętojerska; 7. Nowolipie; 8. Kapitulna; 9. Dziekania; 10. Leszno; 11. Tłumackie; 12. Mariensztadt; 13. Dziekanka; 14. Wielopole; 15. Grzybów; 16. Bielino (also [24]); 17. Stanisławów; 18. Aleksandria; 19. Nowoświecka; 20. Ordynacka; 21. Tamka-Kałęczyn; 22. Bożydar-Kałęczyn; 23. Nowogrodzka; 24. Bielino (also [16]); 25. Solec; 26. Golędzinów; 27. Praga; 28. Skaryszew-Kamion

A number of political circumstances ensured that after the death of King John III's, Poland–Lithuania entered into a period of decline relative to the other powers of Europe. A new king, the Saxon Prince-Elector Frederic Augustus was elected in 1697, who took the name Augustus II. The new monarch was more concerned with the fortunes of his mother country, the Electorate of Saxony, than of Poland. At the same time, the Polish gentry began to intensively fight for their own rights against the Crown with less thought for maintaining the kingdom's position obtained in the 17th century. Moreover, the rulers of the neighboring Russian Empire (Peter I the Great) and Swedish Empire (Charles XII) were gradually extending their territories and strengthening their power. In 1700, the Great Northern War broke out between these two states; Augustus II recklessly joined it on Peter I's side. The decentralized Polish Crown lacked sufficient power to assert itself in the Great Northern War, which led to Poland to becoming a battlefield between the two neighbouring kingdoms. Warsaw was besieged several times; the first time, in 1702, by Swedish Army troops. The city suffered severely from the Swedish occupation. Under the Swedish influence, in June 1704 the Polish gentry dethroned Augustus II and at Wielka Wola elected a new king, the pro-Swedish Poznań Voivod Stanisław Leszczyński. Shortly afterwards, the tides of war changed and on September 1, 1704, Warsaw was retaken by the Saxon army of Augustus II after five days of a severe artillery bombardment. Augustus in turn lost Warsaw after being defeated in a battle fought on 31 July 1705. In this action, which took place between today's Warszawa Zachodnia station and Wielka Wola, 2,000 Swedish troops defeated 10,000 soldiers of the Polish-Lithuanian-Saxon army Only now Stanisław Leszczyński could be officially crowned, which took place in October of that year. In 1707, by virtue of the peace treaty between Augustus II and Charles XII, Imperial Russian Army troops entered Warsaw. After two months, Russian forces were removed from Warsaw. Several times during the Northern war the city was obliged to pay heavy contributions. Leszczyński reigned until 1709, when Russia defeated Sweden in the Battle of Poltava, forcing the Swedish army to leave Poland. Following the Swedish defeat, Augustus II once again became the King of Poland. From 1713 onwards, the Russian and Saxon troops were permanently stationed in Warsaw, which led to an oppressive occupation. Besides the tribulations of war, Warsaw was hit by pest (1708), flood (1713) and poor crops.

Augustus II died in February 1733. In September, the Polish gentry again elected as King Stanisław Leszczyński, but it did not matched the political interests of Austria and Russia, which, one month later, forced the Sejm to elect the Augustus II's son, Augustus III. Conflicts of interests between the Leszczyński camp and its patrons Sweden and France and the followers of Augustus III and his patrons Russia and Austria led to the War of the Polish Succession, where Poland again was not more than a battlefield; Warsaw again suffered marches and occupations. As a result of the war, Augustus III remained king and Leszczyński fled to France. Despite the political weakness of the state, the Saxon period was the time of development for Warsaw. The Saxon kings brought many German architects, who rebuilt Warsaw in the style similar to Dresden. In 1747 the Załuski Library was established in Warsaw by Józef Andrzej Załuski and his brother, Andrzej Stanisław Załuski. It was considered to be the first Polish public library and one of the largest libraries in the contemporary world. In all of Europe there were only two or three libraries, which could pride themselves on having such a vast book collection. The library initially had about 200,000 items, which grew to about 400,000 printed items, maps and manuscripts by the end of the 1780s. It also accumulated a collection of art, scientific instruments, and plant and animal specimens.

In 1740 Stanisław Konarski, a Catholic priest, founded Collegium Nobilium, a university for noblemen's sons, which is the predecessor of the University of Warsaw. In 1742, the City Committee was established, which was responsible for building of pavements and sewage system. But large parts of the greater Warsaw urban area remained out of control of the municipal authorities. Only in the 1760s did the entire Warsaw urban area come under one administration, thanks to efforts of the future President Jan Dekert (in Poland, the mayors of bigger cities are called Presidents). Before, the greater Warsaw urban area was divided into 7 districts.

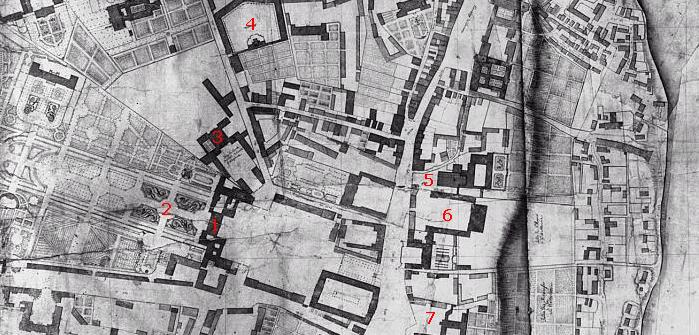
1762 map (detail).

In 1764, a new Polish king was elected, the pro-Russian Stanisław August Poniatowski. Poland became practically a Russian protectorate after his election. In 1772, the First Partition of Poland took place. Polish historians state that the partition was the necessary shock for the Polish gentry to “wake up” and start to think about the future of the country. Owing to the reforming mood, the Enlightenment excised massive influence in Poland and along with it, new ideas of the improvement of Poland. In 1765, the King established Korpus Kadetów, the first secular school in Warsaw. Despite its name, it was not a military school. In 1773, the first ministry of education in the world came into existence: the Commission of National Education (Komisja Edukacji Narodowej). In 1775, a new bridge on the Vistula was built, which lasted until 1794.

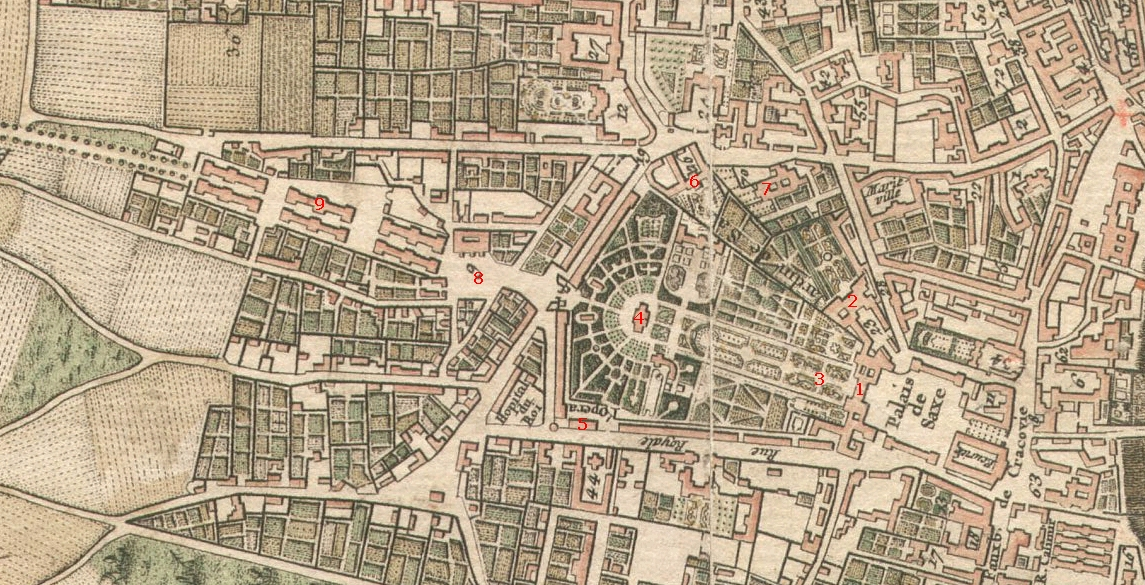
The Saxon Axis in about 1781.

This time marked a new and characteristic stage in the development of Warsaw. It turned into an early-capitalistic principal city. The growth of political activity, development of progressive ideas, political and economic changes – all this exercised an impact on the formation of the city whose architecture began to reflect the contemporary aspirations and trends. Factories developed, the number of workers increased, the class of merchants, industrialists and financiers expanded. At the same time there was a large-scale migration of peasants to Warsaw. In 1792, Warsaw had 115,000 inhabitants as compared with 24,000 in 1754. These changes brought about the development of the building trade. Noblemen put up new residences, and the middle class built houses that showed a marked social differentiation. The residences of the representatives of the wealthiest stratum – the big merchants and bankers – matched those of the magnates. A new type of city dwellings developed, catering to the needs and tastes of the bourgeoisie. The artistic medium for all these buildings was that of antiquity, which, although its different social origin was not analyzed at the time, expressed the progressive ideas of the Enlightenment.

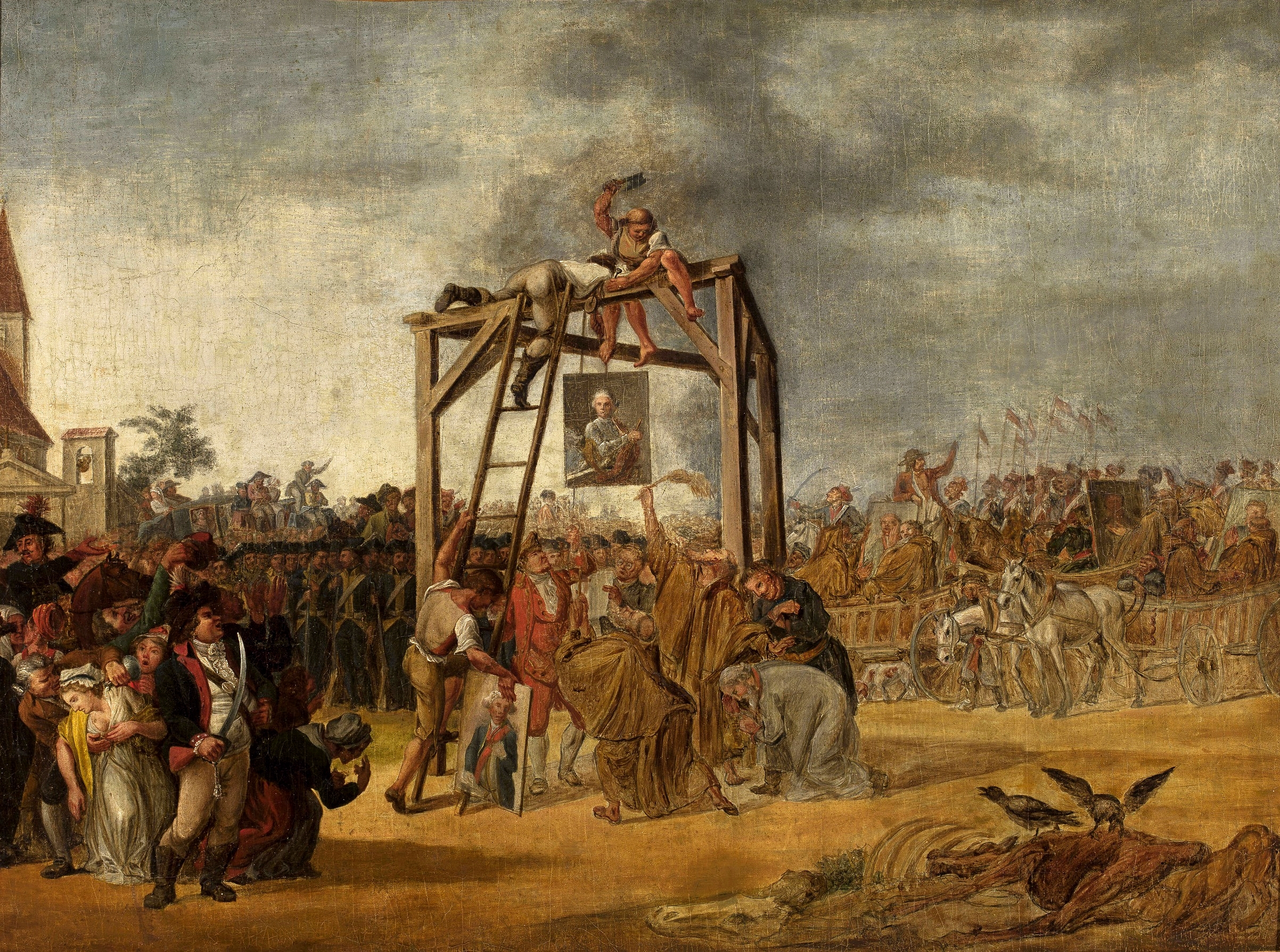
Hanging of traitors in effigie at Warsaw's Old Town Market, a contemporary painting by Jan Piotr Norblin. The supporters of the Targowica Confederation, responsible for the second partition of Poland, became public enemies. If they could not be captured, their portraits were hanged instead.

In 1788, the Sejm gathered to discuss the ways to improve the political situation and to regain the full independence. As Poland was more or less a de facto Russian protectorate, the Empress Catherine II had to give permission for session. Catherine had no objection because she did not foresee any danger, and besides she needed a Polish help in the war against Turkey. But as the result the Sejm in Warsaw (called Great because of the duration of the session) passed the Constitution of May 3, 1791, which the British historian Norman Davies calls "the first constitution of its kind in Europe". It was adopted as a "Government Act" (Polish: Ustawa rządowa) on that date by the Sejm (parliament) of the Polish–Lithuanian Commonwealth. It was in effect for only a year. The Russo-Turkish War had finished and Empress Catherine could turn her attention to Polish affairs. The result was the Second Partition of Poland of 1793, which in turn led to the 1794 Warsaw Uprising. It was an insurrection by the city's populace early in the Kościuszko Uprising. Supported by the Polish Army, it aimed to throw off Russian control of the Polish capital. The uprising began on April 17, 1794, soon after Tadeusz Kościuszko's victory at Racławice.

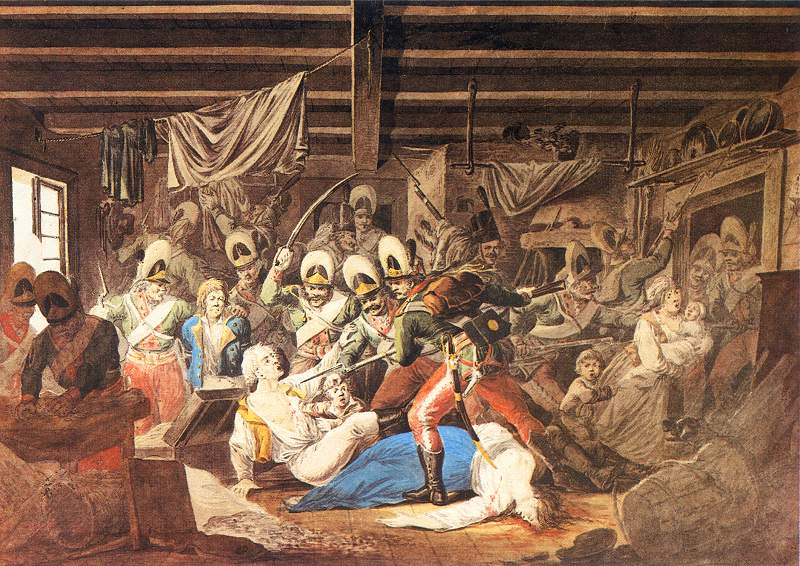
Slaughter of Praga by Aleksander Orłowski, 1810.

After the Battle of Maciejowice General Tadeusz Kościuszko was captured by the Russians. The internal struggle for power in Warsaw and the demoralisation of the city's population prevented General Józef Zajączek from finishing the fortifications surrounding the city both from the east and from the west. At the same time the Russians were making their way towards the city. The Russian forces reached the east outskirts of Warsaw on November 3, 1794. The heavy fighting lasted for four hours and resulted in a complete defeat of the Polish forces. Only a small part managed to evade encirclement and retreated to the other side of the river across a bridge; hundreds of soldiers and civilians fell from a bridge and drowned in the process. After the battle ended, the Russian troops, against the orders given by General Alexander Suvorov before the battle, started to loot and burn the entire borough of Warsaw (allegedly in revenge for the slaughter or capture of over half the Russian Garrison in Warsaw during the Warsaw Uprising in April 1794, when about 2,000 Russian soldiers died). Almost all of the area was pillaged, burnt to the ground and many inhabitants of the Praga district were murdered. The exact death toll of that day remains unknown, yet it is estimated up to 20,000 men, women and children were killed. In Polish history and tradition, these events are called “slaughter of Praga”. A British envoy, William Gardiner, wrote to British Prime Minister William Pitt the Younger that “the attack on the Praga's lines of defense was accompanied by the most gruesome and totally unnecessary barbarousness”.

After the fall of Kościuszko Uprising, The Polish–Lithuanian Commonwealth was finally divided between the three neighbors (the 3rd partition, 1795): Russia, Prussia and Austria. Warsaw found itself in the Prussian part and became the capital of South Prussia.

Another result of the Great Sejm works directly concerned Warsaw: on 21 April 1791 it passed the City Act, which cancelled jurydykas. Since that time, Warsaw and its former jurydykas have constituted a homogeneous urban organism under one administration. As a memento of this event, April 21 is celebrated as the Warsaw Day.

== 1795–1914 ==
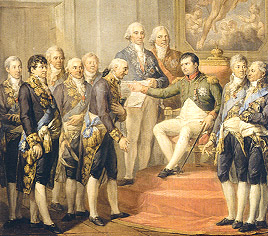
Napoleon conferring the Duchy of Warsaw Constitution in 1807.

Warsaw remained the capital of the Polish–Lithuanian Commonwealth until 1795, when it was annexed by the Kingdom of Prussia to become the capital of the province of South Prussia. Liberated by Napoleon's army in 1806, Warsaw was made the capital of the newly created Duchy of Warsaw. Following the Congress of Vienna of 1815, Warsaw became the center of Congress Poland, a constitutional monarchy under personal union with Imperial Russia. During this period under the rule of the relatively liberal Russian Emperor Alexander I, Warsaw experienced much growth such as the founding of the Royal University of Warsaw (1816). What is today's main street of the city—Aleje Jerozolimskie—was marked out. In 1818, the Town Hall on the Old Town Market was pulled down because it had become too small for the city, which had expanded after it incorporated the jurydykas. The city's authorities moved to Jabłonowski's Palace (by the Great Theater), where it stayed until World War II.

Following the repeated violations of the Polish constitution by the Russians (especially after the Alexander I's death, when the reactionary Nicholas I assumed power), the 1830 November Uprising broke out. It started with the assault on Belvedere – the residence of Grand Duke Constantine Pavlovich, the commander-in-chief of Polish army and de facto viceroy of the Congress Poland, as well as at the Arsenal. The 1830 uprising led to the Polish-Russian war (1831), the greatest battle of which took place on 25 February 1831 in Grochów — a village in the modern northern part of the district, Praga Południe. Because the Polish commanders were stalled, the war ended in defeat, and curtailment of the Kingdom's autonomy. The Emperor established a military administration in Warsaw. An estate of pretty manors on the north of New Town was eradicated and on this place the Citadel was built, a fortress with prison. The Sejm was suspended, the Polish military dissolved, and the university closed.

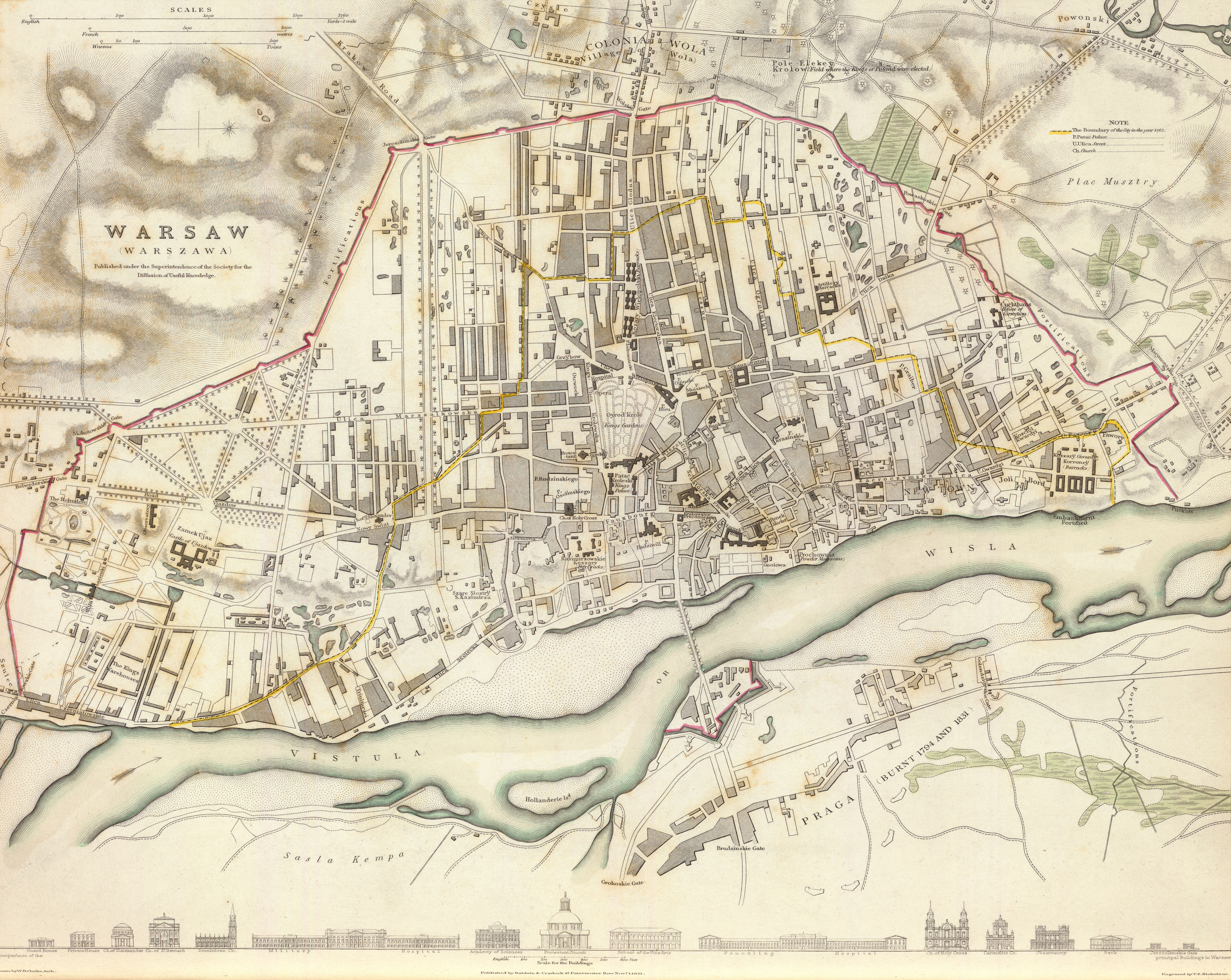
1831 map of Warsaw with Lubomirski Ramparts marked in red.

Growth of railways turned Warsaw into an important railways hub, as lines were opened to Vienna (1848), Saint Petersburg (1862), Bydgoszcz (1862), Terespol (1867), Kovel (1873), Mlava (1877), Kalisz (1902), along with several shorter lines. In 1875 and 1908, two railway bridges were built. In 1864, the first iron road bridge on stone supports, Most Kierbedzia, opened. It was one of the most modern bridges in Europe at the time. Today, the Śląsko-Dąbrowski bridge lies at the same supports. Only then the city's authorities started to rebuild Praga, which was heavily damaged during the Kościuszko's and November Uprisings, as well as by Napoleon's war. In 1862, the university was opened again, in 1898 the Nicholas II Technical Institute (the Warsaw Technical University's predecessor) was established.

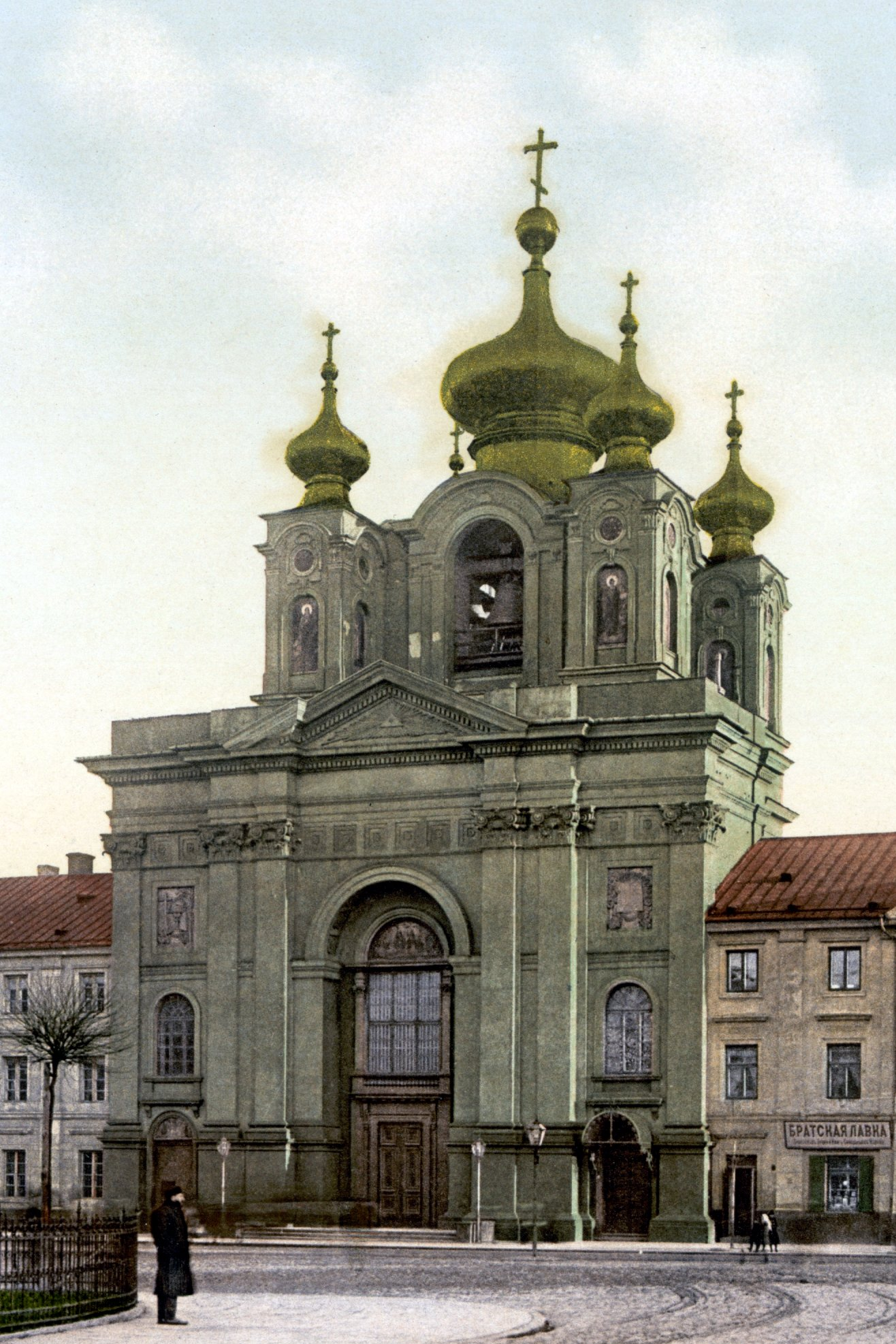
Religion was an element of Russification in the Russian Empire. This Roman Catholic Church in Warsaw was seized and converted into a Russian Orthodox Church while Warsaw was a part of the Russian Empire.

Warsaw flourished in the late 19th century under Mayor Sokrates Starynkiewicz (1875–92), a Russian-born general appointed by Tsar Alexander III. Under Starynkiewicz Warsaw saw its first water and sewer systems designed and built by the English engineer William Lindley and his son, William Heerlein Lindley, as well as the expansion and modernization of horsecars, street lighting and gas works. Starynkiewicz also founded the Bródno Cemetery (1884), still one of the biggest European cemeteries. As a remembrance of the President, one of the Warsovian squares bears the name of Starynkiewicz, even though he represented the Russian authorities.

Warsaw's development, however, was accompanied by an intensive assault on Polish national identity. Russian authorities closed Polish schools and built more and more Orthodox churches. These acts were strongly opposed. On 27 February 1861, Russian troops fired on a Warsaw crowd that was protesting Russian rule. Five people were killed. On 22 January 1863 a new uprising broke out. The Underground Polish National Government resided in Warsaw during January Uprising in 1863–4. However, this uprising was mainly in the character of guerilla, therefore Warsaw did not distinguish itself in it. But, as a penalty, President Kalikst Witkowski, the Russian general and predecessor of Sokrates Starynkiewicz, constantly imposed tributes on Warsaw. After Cossacks and police fired on demonstrators in January 1905 (Revolution in the Kingdom of Poland (1905–1907), after the St. Petersburg's “bloody Sunday”), strikes broke out throughout Poland. The Alfonse Pogrom, entailing violent attacks on brothels and street fighting, occurred in May 1905.

First Russian Empire Census of 1897 recorded Warsaw's population as 61.7% Polish, 27.1% Jewish, 7.3% Russian, 1.7% German and 2,2% others. According to the 1897 census, Warsaw was the third largest city in the Russian Empire (after Moscow and St. Petersburg), and the largest Polish city located in the Russian partition of Poland.

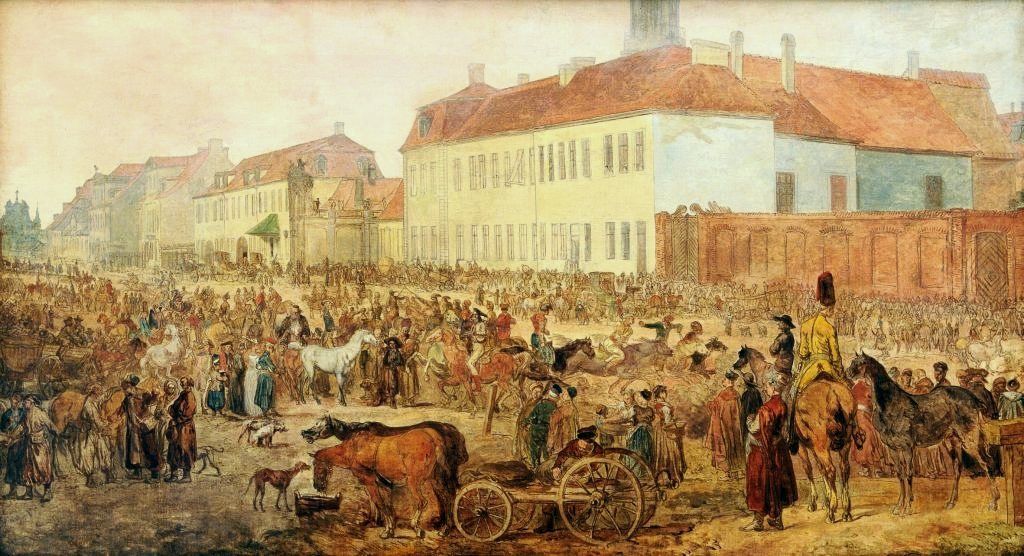
Królewska Street horse market by Jean-Pierre Norblin

In 1904, the first power plant was built. The city installed electric street lamps and, in 1908, opened the first electric tram route. In 1910, 1000 arrested strikers were released after the city's streetcar company agreed to consider wage demands. In 1914, a third bridge opened—Most Józefa Poniatowskiego.

By the start of World War I, the Warsaw horse market was considered one of the most important in Europe. This was due in part to Warsaw being amidst good grazing and horse-using regions. The szlachta held notable stock farms.

== World War I ==
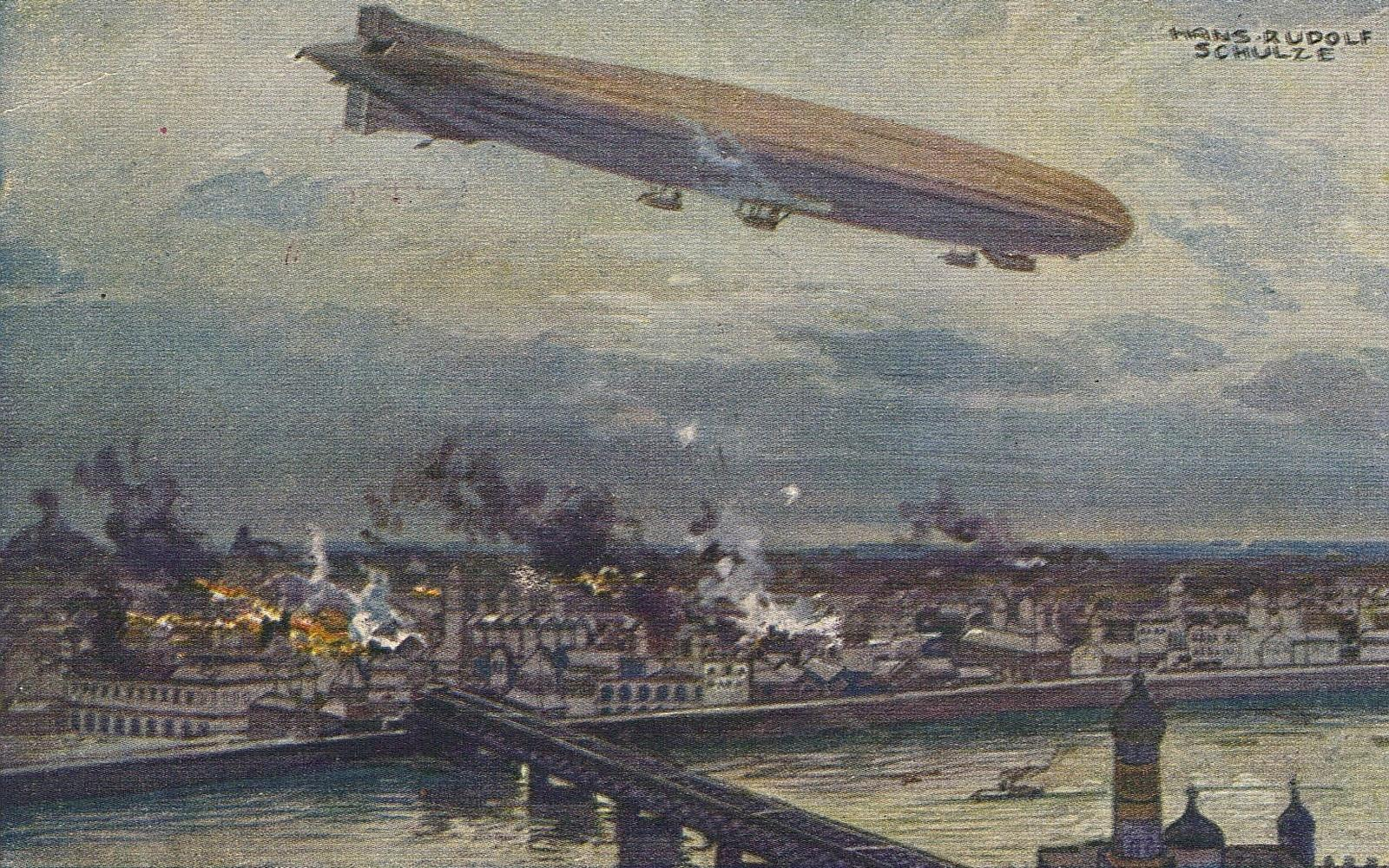
German airship Schütte Lanz SL2 bombing Warsaw in 1914.

After nearly one year of fighting on the Eastern Front, on 1 August 1915 the Imperial German Army under August von Mackensen finally entered Warsaw. The Russian army, during its Great Retreat from Poland, demolished all the Warsovian bridges—and the Poniatowski Bridge that had opened 18 months earlier—and took the equipment from the factories, which made the situation in Warsaw much more difficult.

The German authorities, headed by General Hans von Beseler, needed Polish support in the war against Russia, so they tried to appear friendly to the Poles. For example, they reintroduced the right to teach in Polish, and in 1915 they opened the Technical University, Warsaw School of Economics, and Warsaw University of Life Sciences.

However, the most important decision made for city development was to incorporate the suburbs. The Russian authorities hadn't allowed the extension the Warsaw's area, because it was forbidden to cross the double line of forts surrounding the city. For this reason, at the beginning of World War I on the area of today's Śródmieście and the old part of Praga (c. 33 square kilometres (13 sq mi) 750,000 people lived. In April 1916, the Warsaw territory extended to 115 square kilometres (44 sq mi).

In November 1918, the revolution broke out in Germany. On 8 November, German authorities left Warsaw. On 10 November Józef Piłsudski came to the Warsaw-Vienna Station. On 11 November the Regency Council gave him all military authority—and on 14 November, all civil authority. For this reason, 11 November 1918 is celebrated as the beginning of the Poland's independence. Warsaw became the capital of Poland.

== 1918–1939 ==
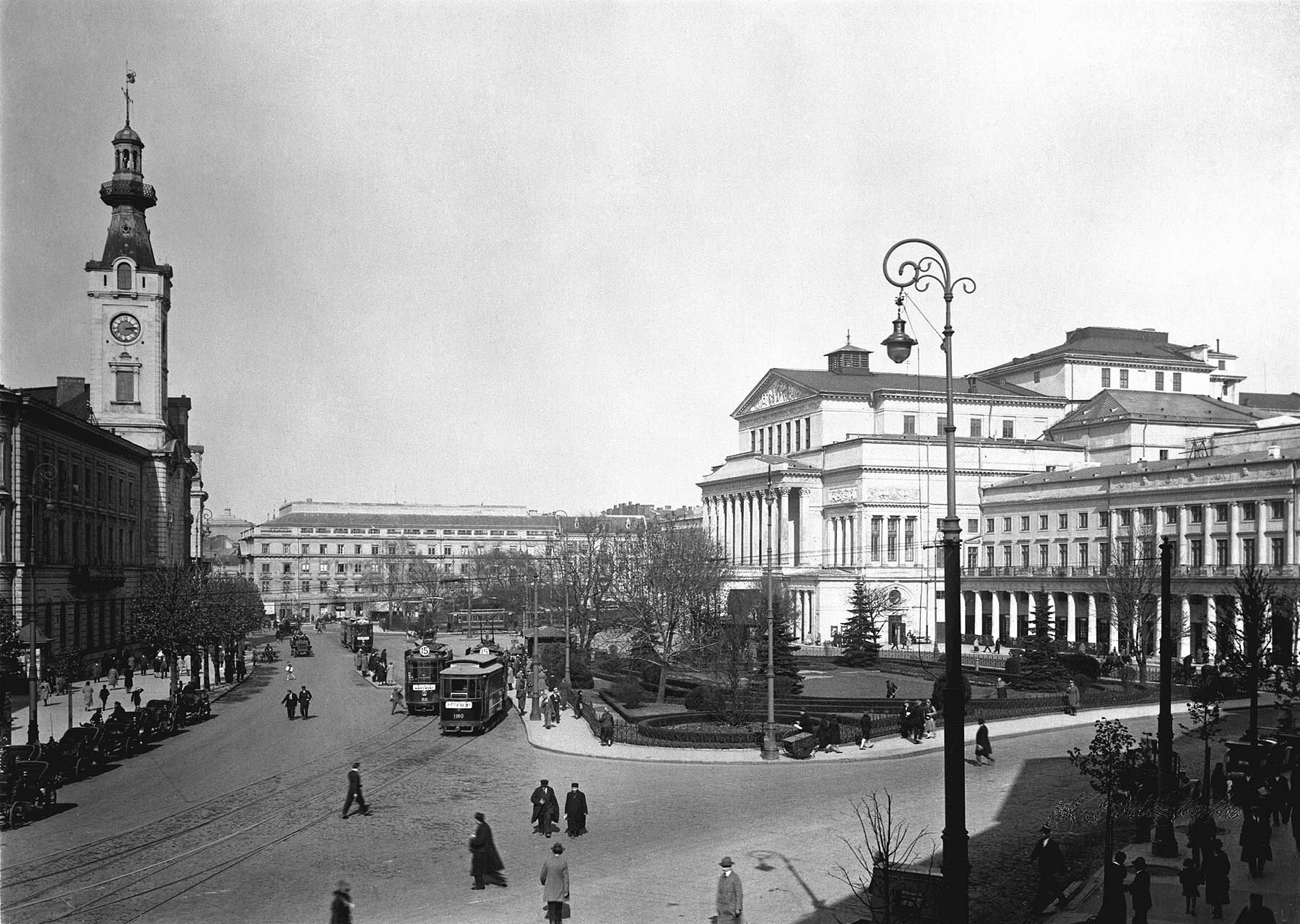
Theatre Square in Warsaw, c. 1925: on the right, the Great Theatre; on the left, Jabłonowski's Palace (1818–1939 seat of President of Warsaw).

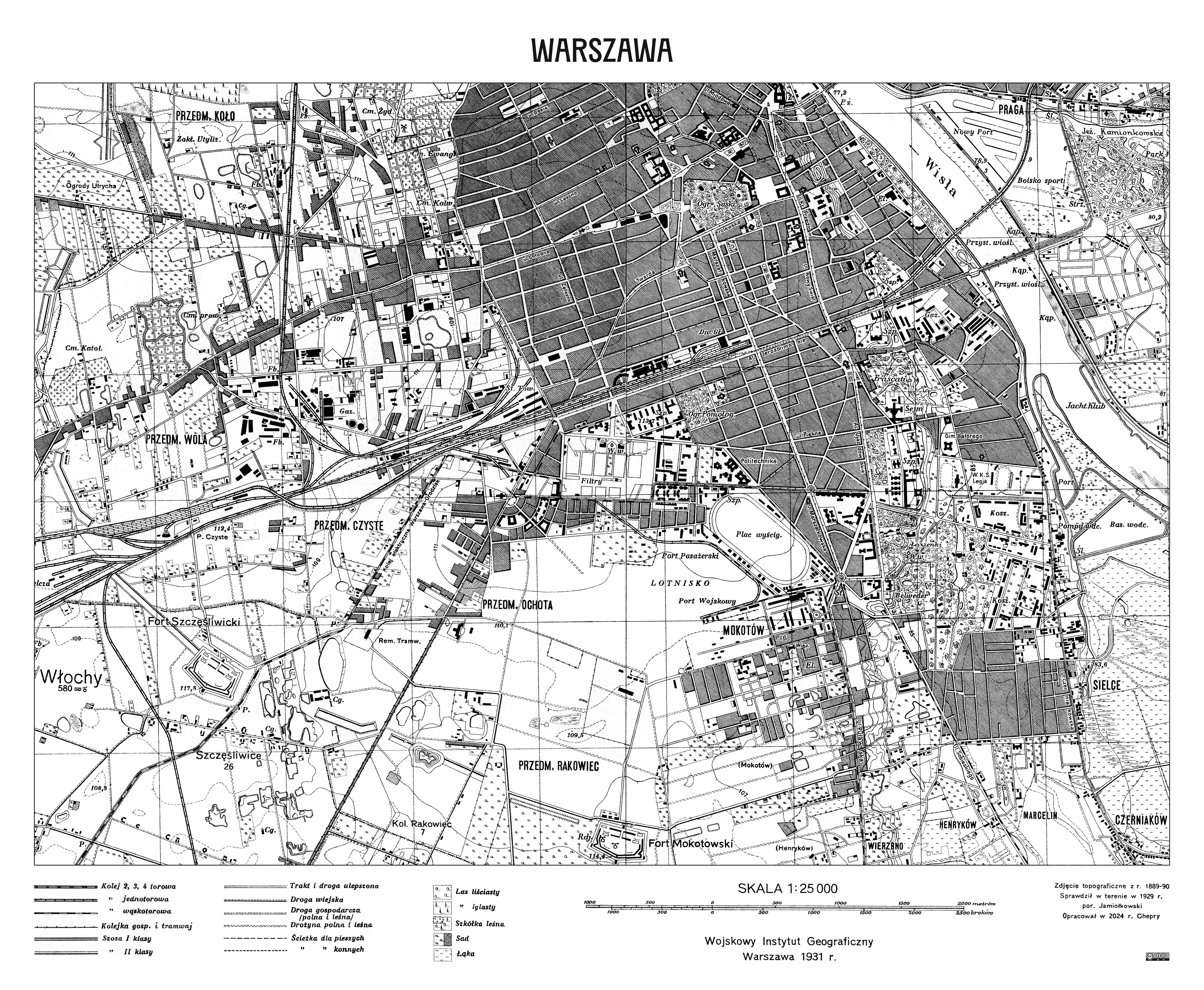
Detailed map of the southern part of warsaw in 1931.

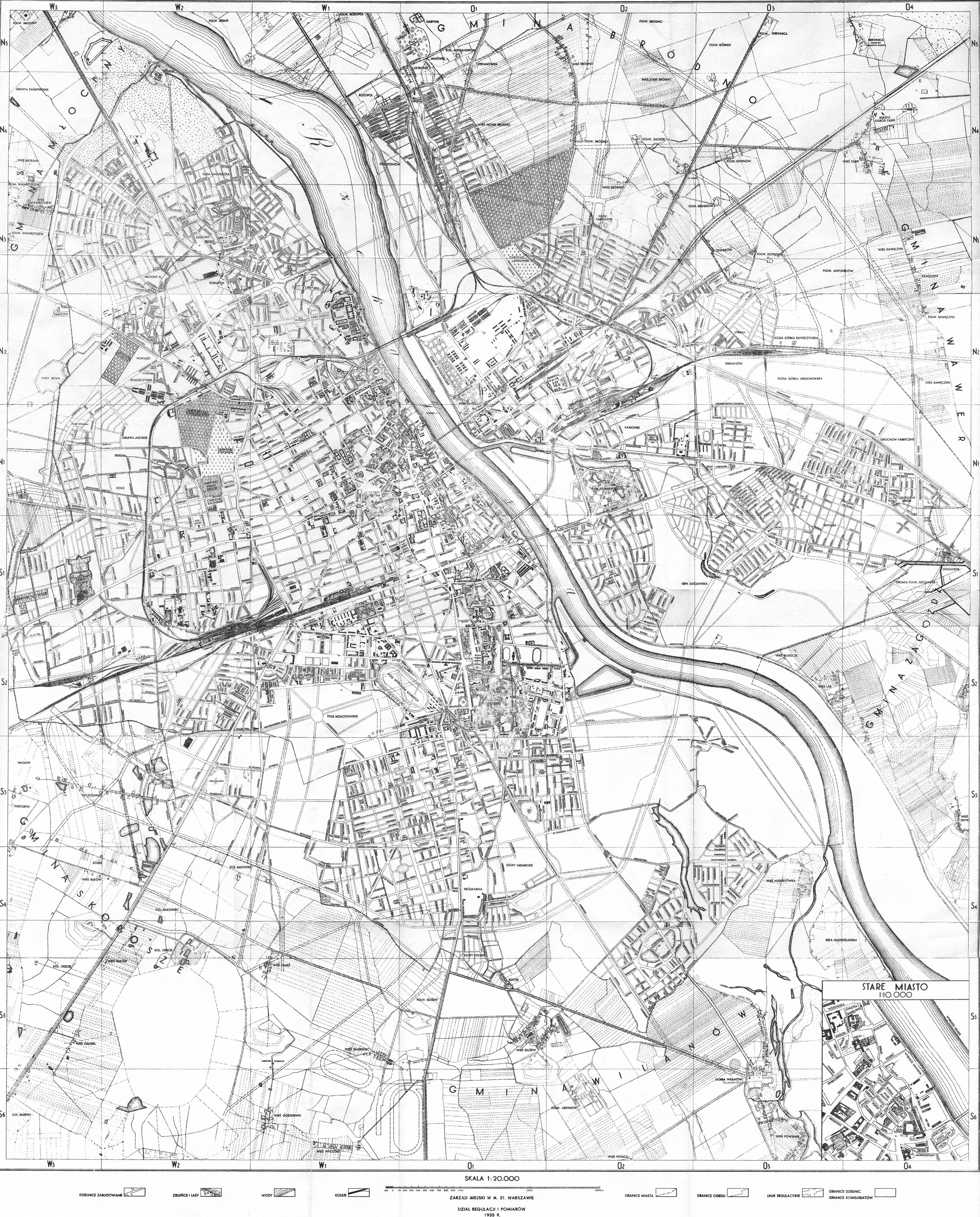
Warsaw in 1935.

The first years of independence were very difficult: war havoc, hyperinflation and the Polish–Soviet War of 1920. In the course of this war, the Battle of Warsaw was fought on the Eastern outskirts of the city, and the capital was successfully defended and the Red Army defeated. Poland stopped, by itself, the full brunt of the Red Army and defeated an idea of the "export of the revolution." Unfortunately, the political and military significance of this victory was never fully appreciated by Europeans. According to Lord d’Abernon: The history of contemporary civilization knows no event of greater importance than the Battle of Warsaw, 1920, and none of which the significance is less appreciated. To commemorate these events, 15 August is celebrated in Poland as Polish Army Day.

On 16 December 1922, in the gallery Zachęta, Eligiusz Niewiadomski, a painter with mental disorder, who belonged to the right-wing National Democracy, assassinated the first President of Poland, Gabriel Narutowicz, who had been elected five days earlier by Sejm.

The other event was the May Coup d'État (1926). On 12 May, Marshall Józef Piłsudski, displeased with the situation in Poland, and in particular with the appointment of a new government, arrived in Warsaw from his residence in Sulejówek (a small town east of Warsaw) at the head of the faithful troops. On the Poniatowski Bridge, he talked with the President Stanisław Wojciechowski, who tried unsuccessfully to convince him to give up the action. The next day, the Piłsudski's troops forcibly conquered Warsaw and forced the government and Wojciechowski to resign. During the coup, street fighting killed almost 400 people—mostly civilians who wanted to watch the fighting. The May Coup started the 13-year period of sanation – the authoritarian rules of Piłsudski's camp. Although Piłsudski himself never accepted the office of President (but twice was Prime Minister), always played a preponderant role in Polish political life.

In 1925, there lived 1,000,000 people in Warsaw. In the next 5 years, the city's wealth doubled. It enabled to build new, broad streets as well as a new airport. The first airport, a temporary one, opened in 1921 in the park Pole Mokotowskie. The second, permanent, airport opened in Okęcie, where it remains. The city government worked out plans for a metro, but construction was hampered by the outbreak of World War II. they opened the first radio station, which had a range that covered almost all the Polish territory.

In 1934, the sanation camp suspended the Warsaw's government and appointed Stefan Starzyński President of Warsaw. He was a faithful supporter of sanation—so, at the beginning of his presidency, he expelled all officials attached to his predecessor. He was also an efficient official, however. He stabilized the city budget, fought corruption and bureaucracy, smartened up the city. However, the Poles remember him mainly due to his heroic behavior during the September Campaign.

== World War II ==
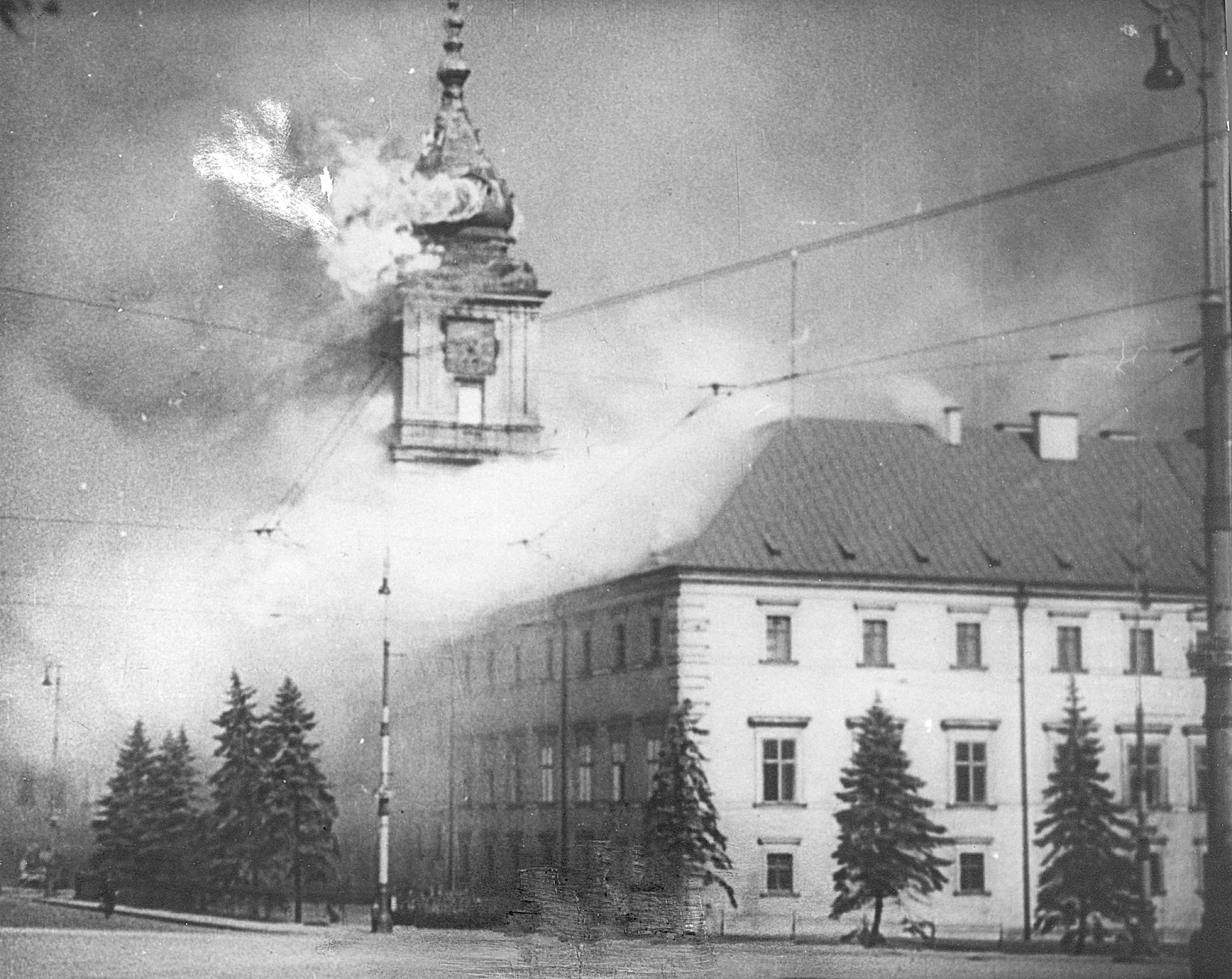
Burning Royal Castle after a German shellfire and bombing raid on 17 September 1939

The first bombs fell on Warsaw already on 1 September 1939, the first day of the Nazi German invasion of Poland. The most important representatives of civil and military administration (along with the Army's Commander-in-Chief, Marshall Edward Rydz-Śmigły) escaped to the Kingdom of Romania, taking with themselves much of the equipment and ammunition intended for the defense of the city. To stop the chaos, Mayor Stefan Starzyński seized full civil power, although he had no entitlement to do this. To prevent public disorder, he appointed the Citizen Guard. All time he supported the people's spirit in radio speeches. On 9 September, the German Army tank divisions attacked Warsaw from south-west, but the defenders (with a lot of civil volunteers) managed to stop them in the Ochota district. The situation was hopeless. The Wehrmacht advanced so many divisions that sooner or later they would conquer the city, all the more so because on 17 September the Soviets invaded east Poland. Three days later the German encirclement around Warsaw closed. On 17 September, the Royal Castle burnt down, then, on 23, the power plant. On 27 September Warsaw surrendered, on September 29 the Polish Army began retreating, and on September 30 the Germans began entering the city. On October 5th, Hitler participated in a parade along Ujazdów Avenue. In September 1939, around 31,000 people died, (including 25,000 civilians) and 46,000 were injured (including 20,000 civilians). 10% of the buildings were destroyed. On 27 October, the Germans arrested President Starzyński and deported him to the Dachau concentration camp, and was shot in December of 1939, somewhere in Warsaw or near the surroundings of Warsaw. Friedrich von Cochenhausen was appointed as the commandant of the city.

During the Second World War, central Poland, including Warsaw, came under the rule of the General Government, a Nazi colonial administration. Nazi Germany planned destruction of the Polish capital before the start of war. On 20 June 1939 while Adolf Hitler was visiting an architectural bureau in Würzburg am Main, his attention was captured by a project of a future German town, Neue deutsche Stadt Warschau. As early as 1939 Hitler approved of a plan known as the Pabst Plan, which envisaged changing Warsaw into a provincial German city. The Germans immediately closed all higher education institutions. Since the first days, the German authorities arrested and executed Poles or took them to the concentration camps. The executions were carried out mainly in the forests around Warsaw (e.g., in Kampinos Forest or Kabaty Woods). Many small monuments on Warsaw streets today commemorate those crimes. Since the beginning of the occupation, the Nazis had organized so-called łapankas. These consisted of the sudden and accurate surrounding of a chosen place (for example, a railway station) and arresting every resident or passerby who happened to be there. in Polish “łapać” means to catch. Such actions were carried out in other occupied European countries, but not on the same scale as in Poland. Arrested people were deported either to concentration camps or forced labor camps in Germany. From 1943, a concentration camp existed also in Warsaw: KL Warschau.

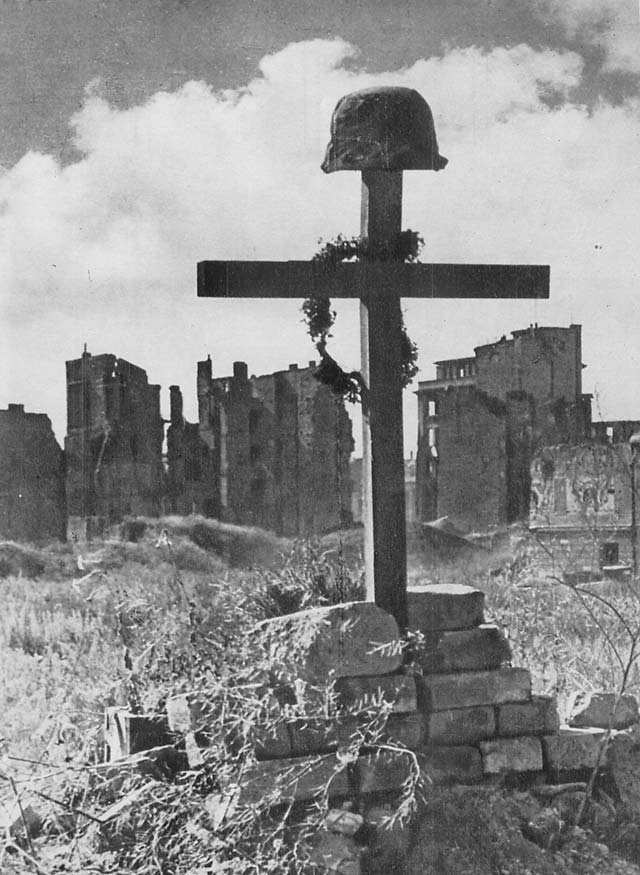
Grave of insurgent from Warsaw Uprising.

Since October 1940, the Germans had been deporting Warsaw's entire Jewish population (several hundred thousand, some 30% of the city) to the Warsaw Ghetto. They amassed c. 500,000 people on the area of c. 2.6 square kilometres (1.0 sq mi). The occupying Germans caused the deaths of many through executions and hunger (the daily food ration for one Jew was only 183 kcal). Since October 1941, every Jewish resident who had left the Ghetto as well as anyone who had been helping in any way the Ghetto residents (e.g. threw food over the Ghetto wall), had been punished with death.

When the order came to annihilate the Ghetto as part of Hitler's "Final Solution" on April 19, 1943, Jewish fighters launched the Warsaw Ghetto Uprising. Despite being heavily outgunned and outnumbered, the Ghetto held out for almost a month. When the fighting ended, almost all survivors were massacred, only few managed to escape or hide. The commander of Verbrennungs und Vernichtungskommando ("Burning and Destruction Detachments"), Jürgen Stroop, destroyed the Ghetto so completely that even house walls did not remain.

By July 1944, the Red Army was deep into Polish territory and pursuing the Germans toward Warsaw. Knowing that Joseph Stalin was hostile to the idea of an independent Poland, the Polish government-in-exile in London gave orders to the underground Home Army (AK) to try to seize the control of Warsaw from the Germans before the Red Army arrived. Thus, on 1 August 1944, as the Red Army was nearing the city, the Warsaw Uprising began.

The armed struggle, planned to last 48 hours, continued for 63 days, until 2 October. Eventually, the Home Army fighters and civilians assisting them were forced to capitulate. They were transported to PoW camps in Germany, while the entire civilian population was expelled.

The Nazis then essentially demolished Warsaw. Hitler, ignoring the agreed terms of the capitulation, ordered the entire city razed to the ground and the library and museum collections taken to Germany or burned. Monuments and government buildings were blown up by special German troops known as Verbrennungs und Vernichtungskommando ("Burning and Destruction Detachments"). About 85% of the city was destroyed, including the historic Old Town and the Royal Castle. In the uprising, c. 170,000 people died, of which only 16,000 were insurgents. The civilians (c. 650,000) were deported to the transit camp in Pruszków (Durchgangslager Pruszków).

On January 17, 1945, after the beginning of the Red Army's Vistula–Oder Offensive, Soviet troops entered the Warsaw ruins, and liberated the suburbs from German occupation. The Soviet Army swiftly took the city and rapidly advanced towards Łódź, as German forces regrouped at a more westward position. During the German occupation (1939–45) c. 700,000 people died in Warsaw, more than all Americans and British. The material losses were about 45 billion dollars.

== Modern times ==
In 1945, after the bombing, the revolts, the fighting, and the demolition had ended, most of Warsaw lay in ruins. Next to the remnants of Gothic architecture the ruins of splendid edifices from the time of Congress Poland and ferroconcrete relics of prewar building jutted out of the rubble.

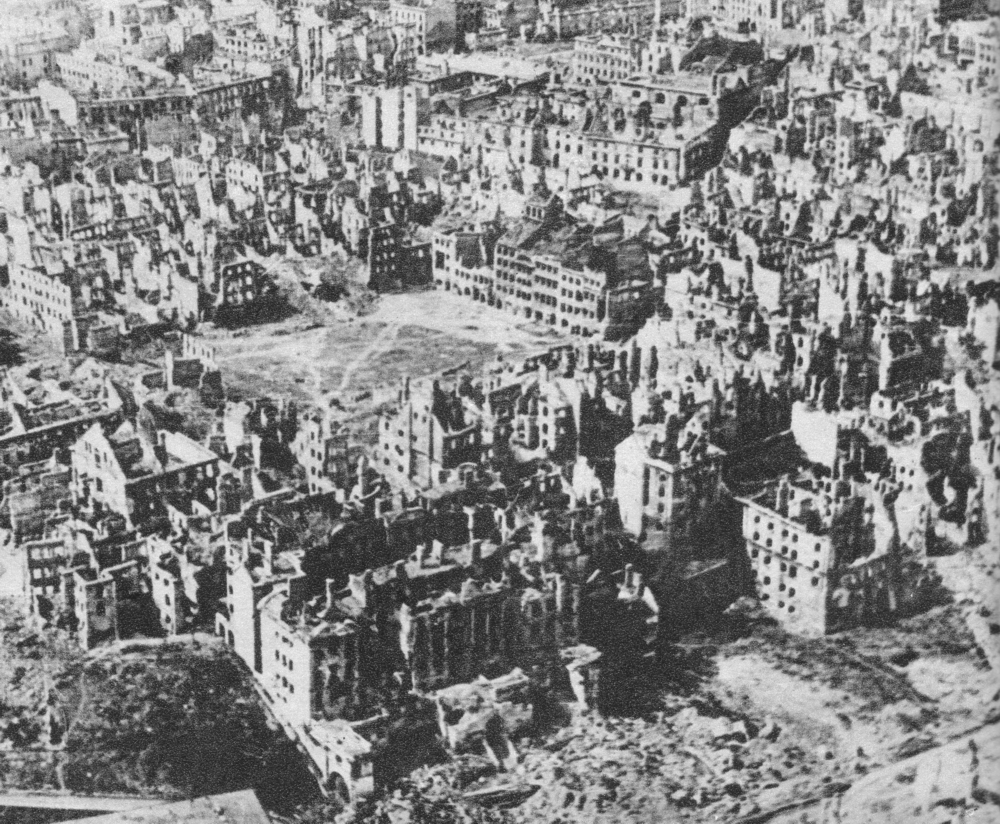
During World War II 85% of buildings in Warsaw were destroyed.

On 17 January 1945, the Soviet troops entered the left part of Warsaw and on 1 February 1945 proclaimed the Polish People's Republic (de facto proclamation had taken place in Lublin, on 22 July 1944). At once, the Bureau of Capital's Rebuilding was established. The architects who worked for the Bureau, following the ideas of functionalism and supported by the Soviet puppet Communist regime, decided to renew Warsaw in modern style, with large free areas. They demolished many existing buildings and buildings that could have been rebuilt. Not all their ideas came off, however. In 1953, the Old Town and the Royal Route were reconstructed to look like they had before the war (aided by numerous pictures by many artists, including Canaletto). On the other hand, due to the absence of the "original" residents, the houses were settled by "common people" who often did not maintain the houses properly. The government did not undertake the complicated and expensive rebuilding of the Royal Castle. Almost all of the property was nationalized (see Bierut Decree).

Rebuilding the Old Town was an achievement on a global scale. In 1980, UNESCO appreciated the efforts and inscribed Old Town onto UNESCO's World Heritage list.

The symbols of the new Warsaw were:

- Warsaw W-Z Route ("Trasa W-Z") under the Old Town (1949)
- MDM estate (1952) (typical socialist realism architecture)
- Palace of Culture and Science (PKiN, 1955) a symbol of Soviet rule, and at that time the second tallest building in Europe
- 10th-Anniversary Stadium (1955).

Construction of the MDM estate and PKiN especially required demolishing existing buildings. Demolition, however, made it possible to create one of the street plans in Europe, aside from poor road conditions and badly planned crossroads.

Construction of the Palace of Culture and Science, symbol of Soviet domination in Poland.

In 1951, Warsaw was significantly enlarged again to address the housing shortage: from 118 square kilometres (46 sq mi) to 411 square kilometres (159 sq mi). In 1957, the town Rembertów was incorporated. On the incorporated areas, the city's government ordered the building of mainly large prefabricated housing projects, typical for Eastern Bloc cities.

The Soviet presence, symbolized by the Palace of Culture and Science, turned out to be very acute. Stalinism lasted in Poland until 1956—as in the USSR. The leader (First Secretary) of the Polish United Workers' Party, (PZPR), Bolesław Bierut, suddenly died in Moscow during the 20th Congress of CPSU in March, probably from a heart attack. By October, the new First Secretary, Władysław Gomułka, in a speech during a rally on the square in front of the PKiN supported the regime liberalization (so-called "thaw"). At first, Gomułka was very popular, because he also had been imprisoned in Stalinist prisons and as he had taken up the office of PZPR's leader, he promised a lot, but the popularity faded quickly. Gomułka was gradually tightening the regime. In January 1968, he forbade the performance of Dziady, a classical drama by Adam Mickiewicz, full of anti-Russian allusions. That was "the last drop of bitterness": then students went out on the Warsaw streets and gathered by the monument to Mickiewicz to protest against censorship. The demonstrations spread throughout the country, and the protestors were arrested by police. This time, the students were not supported by workers, but two years later, when in December 1970 the Polish People's Army fired at the protesting people in Gdańsk, Gdynia and Szczecin, those two social groups cooperated—and that helped end Gomułka.

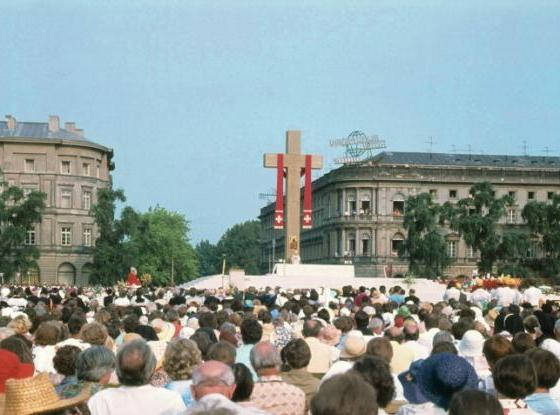
John Paul II's Mass in Victory Square, 1979.

Gomułka was succeeded by Edward Gierek. Compared to the grey Gomułka time, Gierek ruled with a lighter hand. Once in office, Gierek agreed to rebuild the Royal Castle. Gomułka was against this idea until the end of his life, because he was convinced that the Castle was a symbol of the bourgeoisie and feudalism. Rebuilding started in 1971, and finished in 1974—the same year the Trasa Łazienkowska (Łazienkowska Route) was completed. The route and bridge that connect the Warszawa Zachodnia Station area and the Grochów estate—the broad street on the right bank (Praga)—has been named Aleja Stanów Zjednoczonych (The United States Avenue). The next important investments from the Gierek-times are: the Warszawa Centralna station (1975, now the biggest station in Warsaw) and the broad, dual carriageway Warsaw-Katowice, which even now is called "Gierkówka" (in a choice of the destination point, significantly Gierek was born in Silesia, in Sosnowiec). But the prosperity of the Gierek-times was grounded on a very fragile foundation: Gierek took out many loans from other countries and did not know how to manage them efficiently, hence from time to time crises and workers' riots recurred. The first, more serious was in 1976, when workers from Radom and Ursus were striking; that latter city bordered on Warsaw from west, and had a large tractor factory. As a penalty, Ursus was incorporated into Warsaw as a part of the district Ochota; Warsaw expanded by 10 square kilometres (3.9 sq mi).

In the crisis of the 1980s and hard time of martial law, John Paul II's visits to his native country in 1979 and 1983 brought support to the budding Solidarity movement and encouraged the growing anti-communist fervor there. In 1979, less than a year after becoming pope, John Paul celebrated Mass in Victory Square in Warsaw and ended his sermon with a call to "renew the face" of Poland: Let Thy Spirit descend! Let Thy Spirit descend and renew the face of the land! This land! These words were very meaningful for the Polish citizens who understood them as the incentive for the democratic changes.

From February to April 1989, the representatives of the Polish government and "Solidarity" were carried on the negotiations at the Round Table in the Namiestnikowski Palace in Warsaw. The result was an agreement of the government to the participation of "Solidarity" in the Sejm elections, which were appointed at 4 June. Solidarity won all seats for which it could compete according to the Round Table Agreement. It was the beginning of big changes for all Europe.

After the political transformation, the Sejm passed an act, which reinstated the Warsaw city government (18 May 1990).

In 1995, the Warsaw Metro opened. It had been built since 1983. In 2002, city Wesoła was incorporated into Warsaw and capital of Poland expanded again by another 22.6 square kilometres (8.7 sq mi). In March 2021, plans were announced to add a third line to the city’s metro system, connecting the city centre with the district of Praga-Południe on the right (east) bank of the Vistula river, and later also with Ochota and Mokotów as a major part of a wider “New Opening” project that also included new pedestrian and cycling infrastructure in central parts of Warsaw. On 28 September 2022, three new Warsaw metro stations were opened, increasing the number of Warsaw Metro stations to 36 and its length to 38,3 kilometers. In February 2023, Warsaw’s mayor, Rafał Trzaskowski, announced plans to more than double the size of the city’s metro system by 2050.

With the entry of Poland into the European Union in 2004, Warsaw experienced the biggest economic boom of its history. Another important stimulator of the economy was the European football championship in Poland and Ukraine in 2012. Five matches, including the opening match, took place in Warsaw. The city also hosted the 2013 United Nations Climate Change Conference and the 2016 NATO Summit.

As of August 2022, Warsaw had received around 180,000 refugees from Ukraine, because of the 2022 Russian invasion of Ukraine. The amount means a tenth of the Polish capital’s population of 1.8 million — the largest single group of Ukrainian refugees anywhere.

== Historical images ==
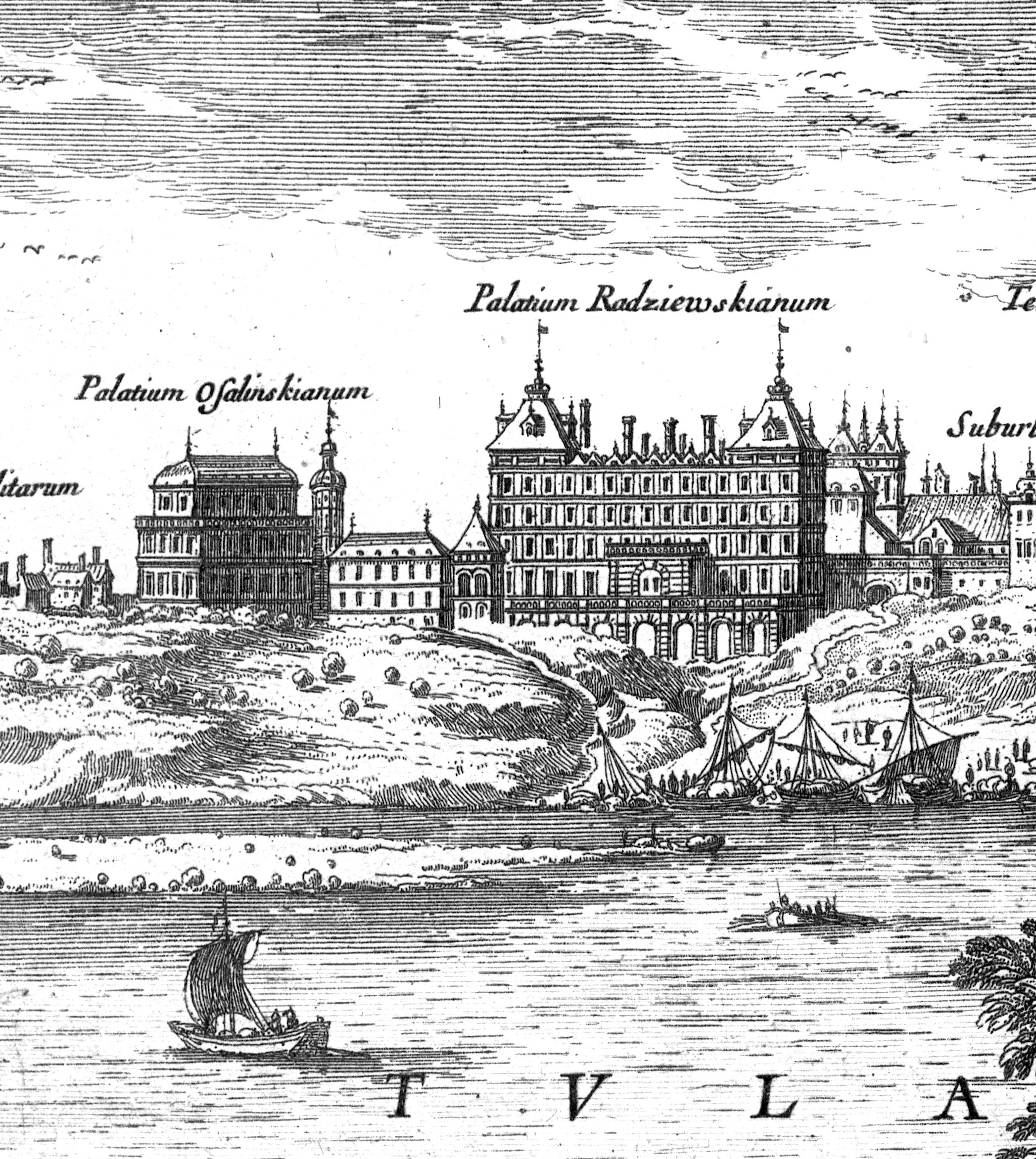
Ossoliński Palace and Kazanowski Palace in 1656

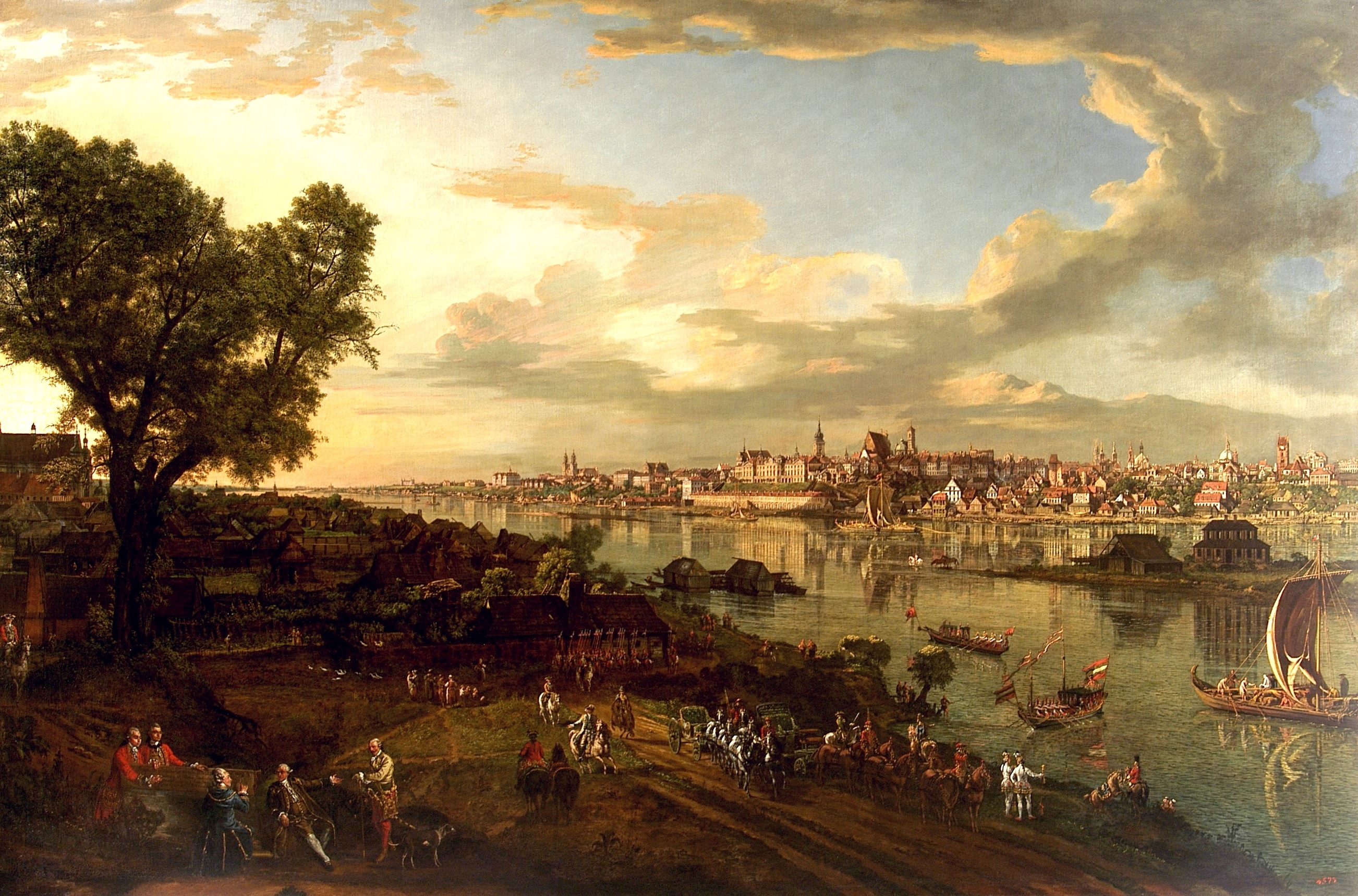
View of Warsaw from Praga in 1770

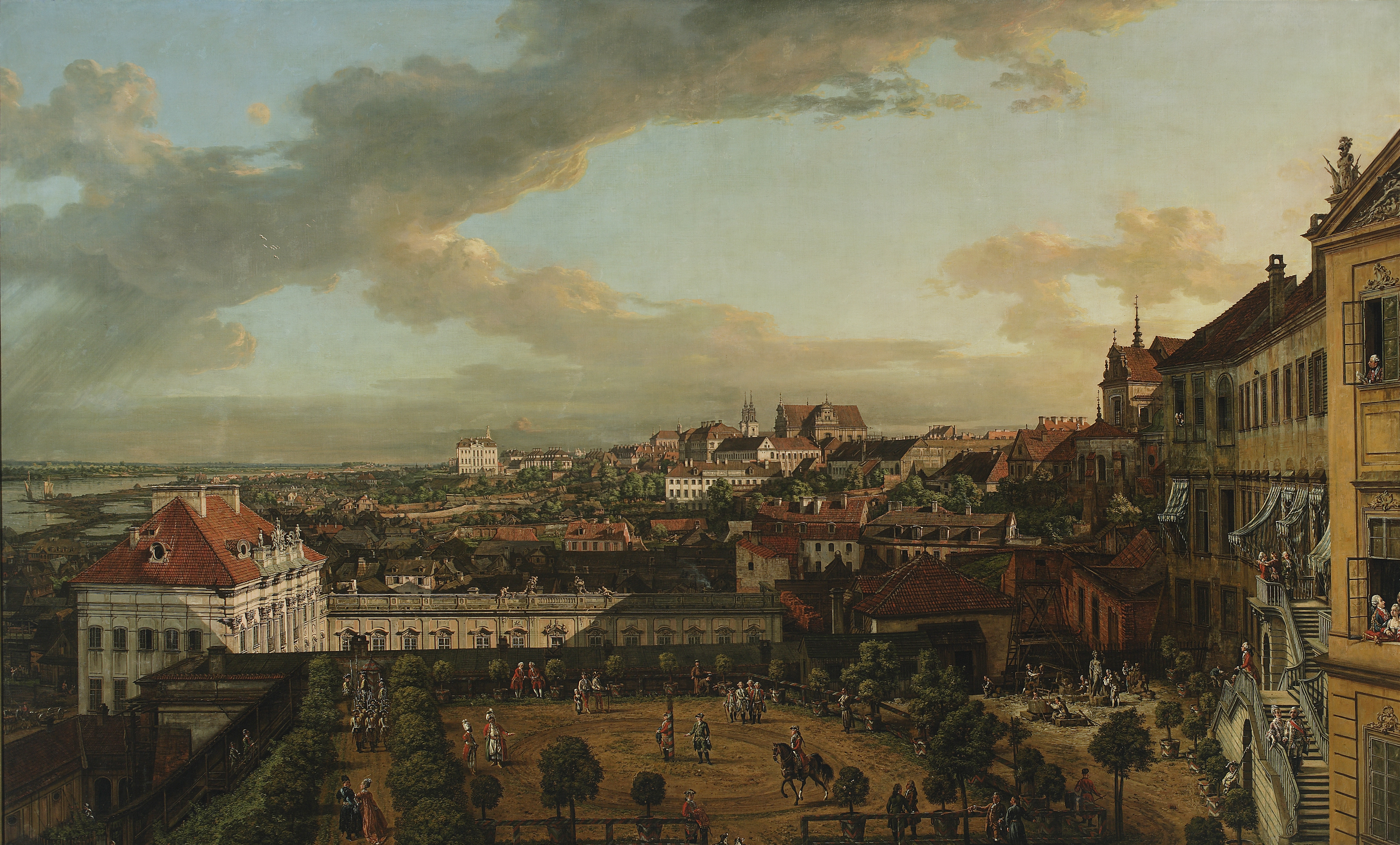
View of Warsaw from the Royal Castle in 1773

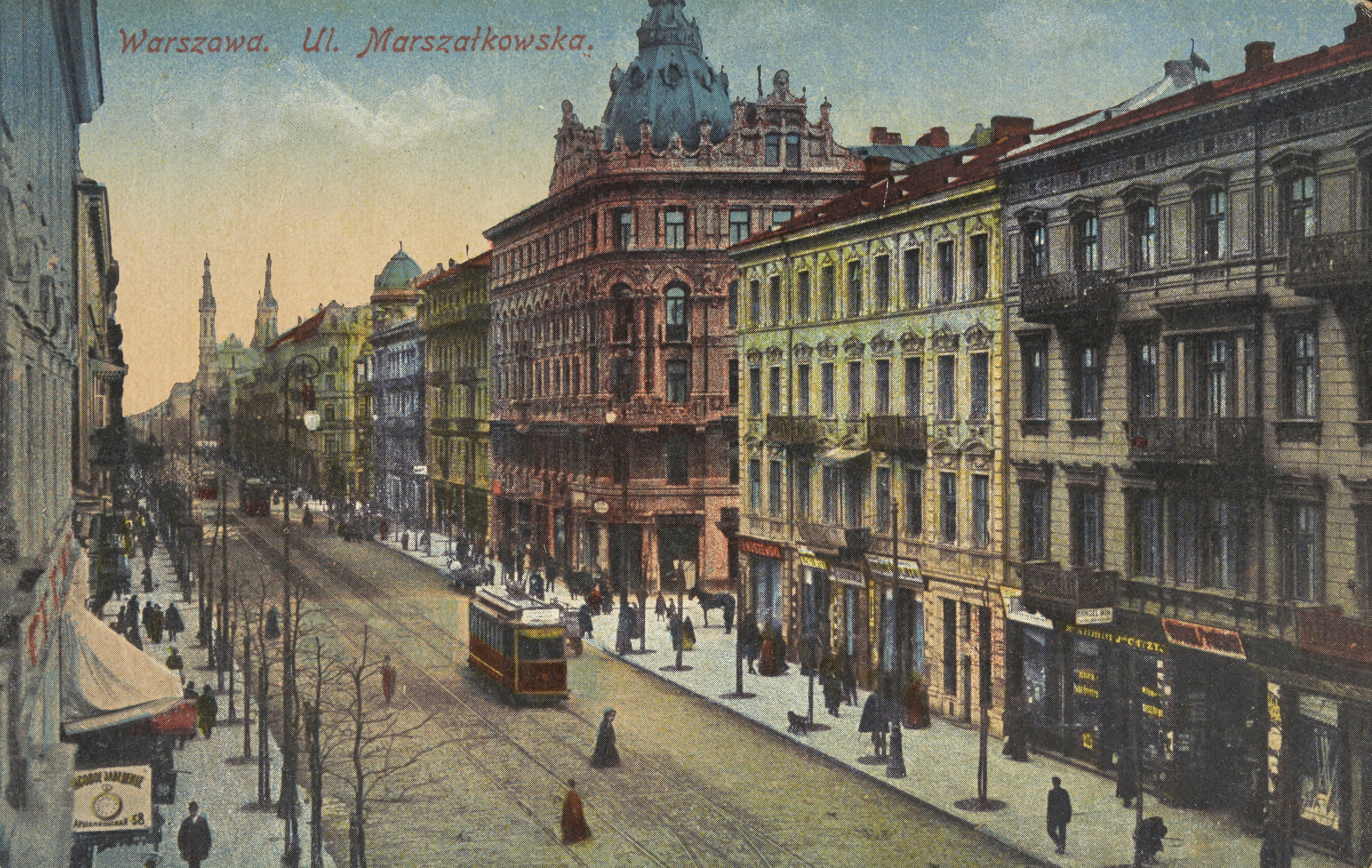
Marszałkowska Street in 1912

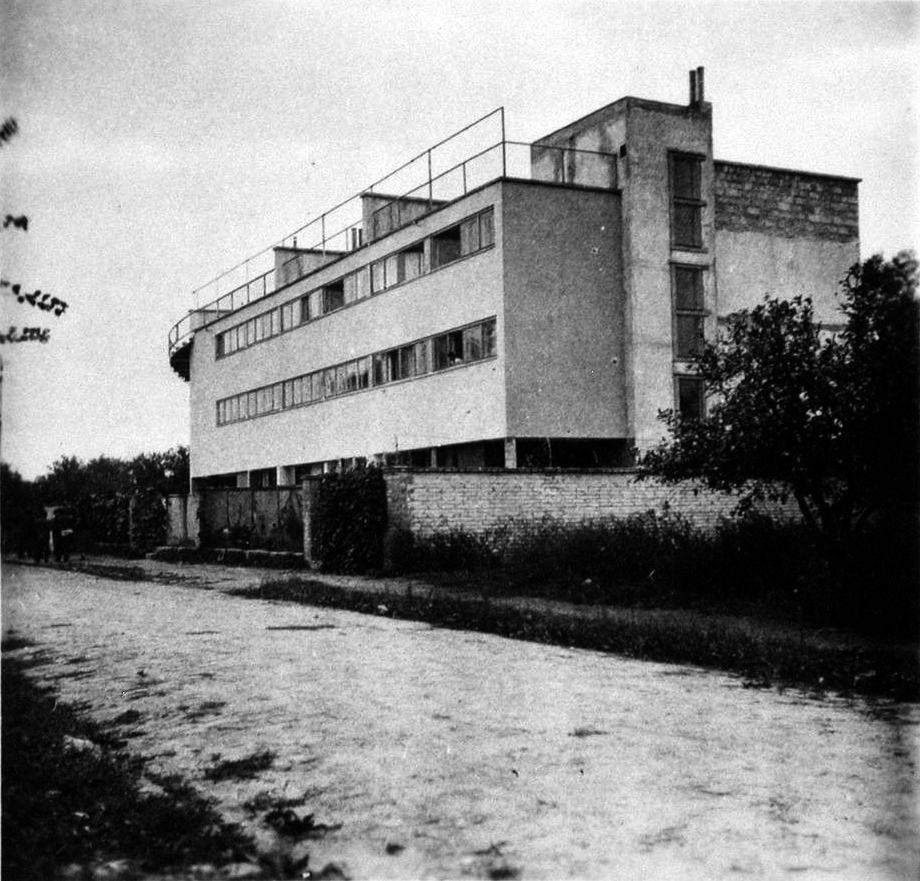
Modern architecture in Warsaw 1929

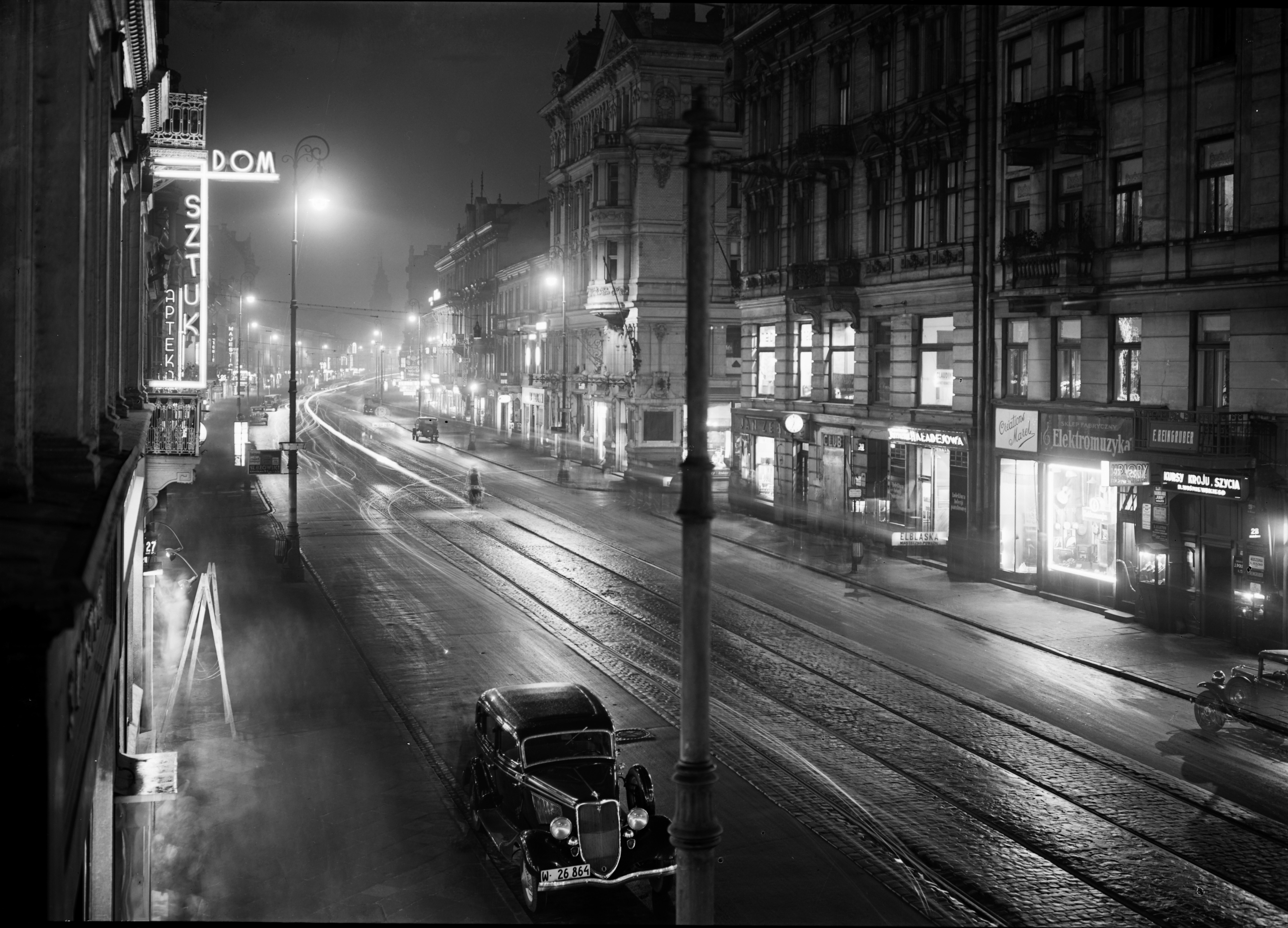
Warsaw 1935

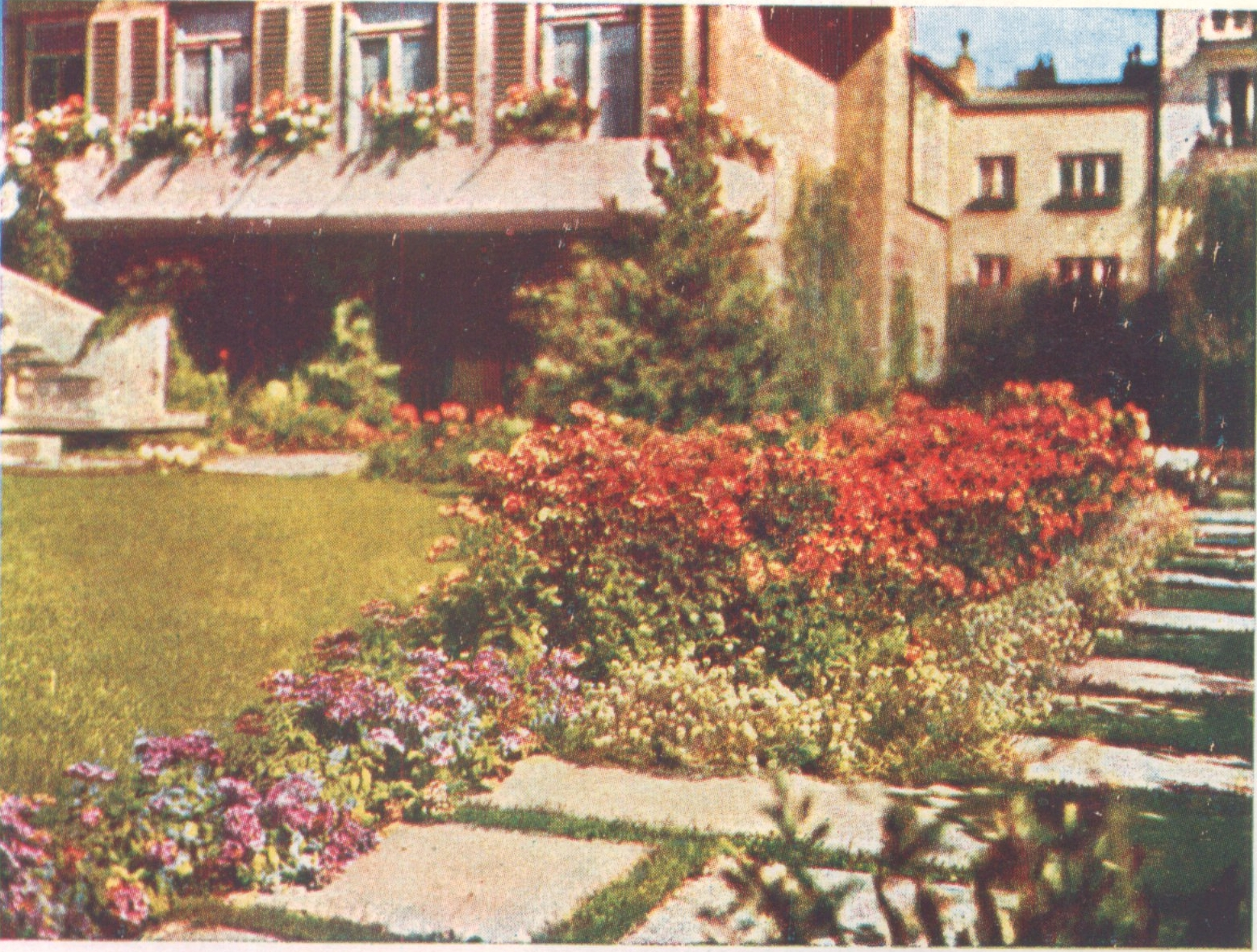
Warsaw 1937

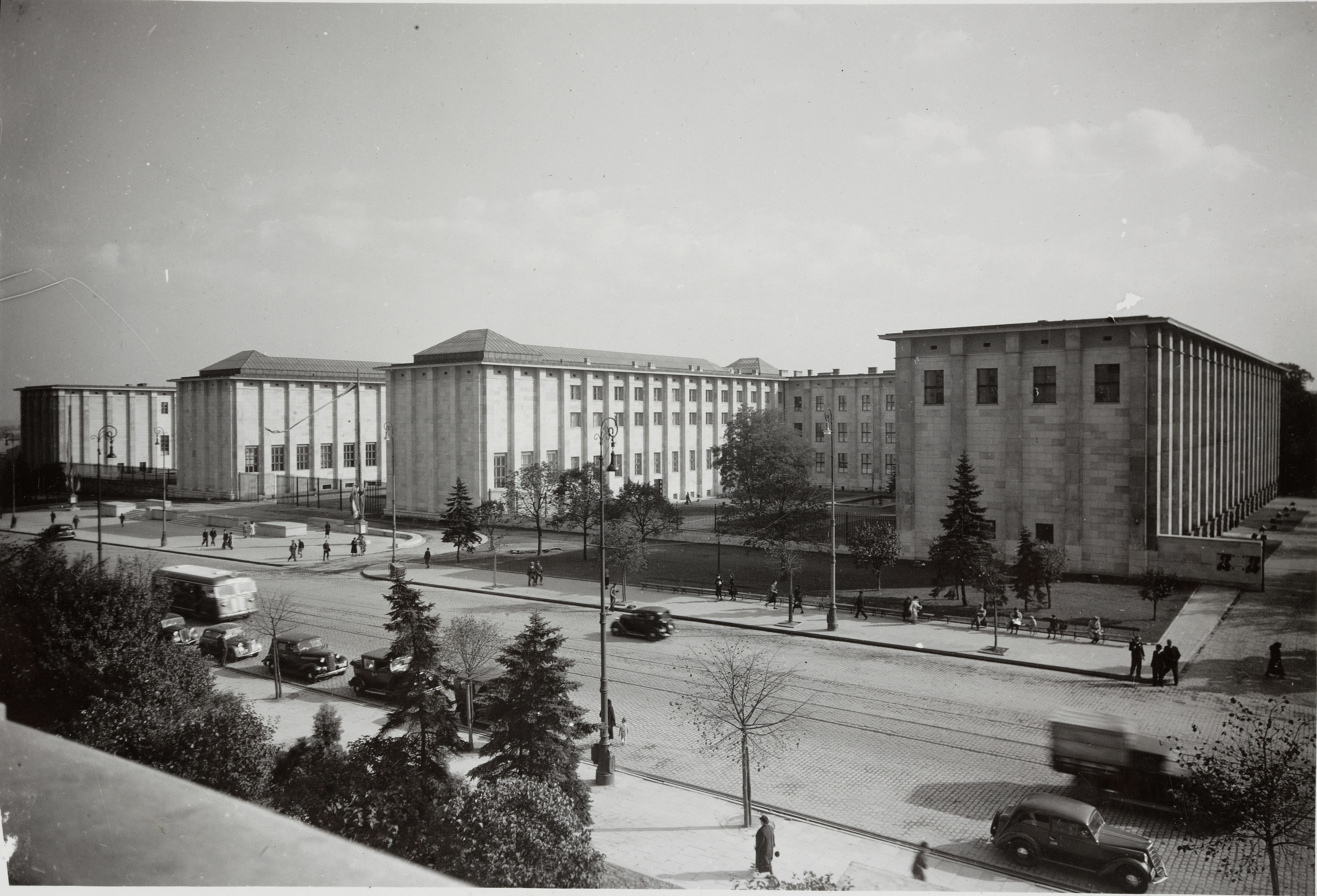
The National Museum in Warsaw 1938

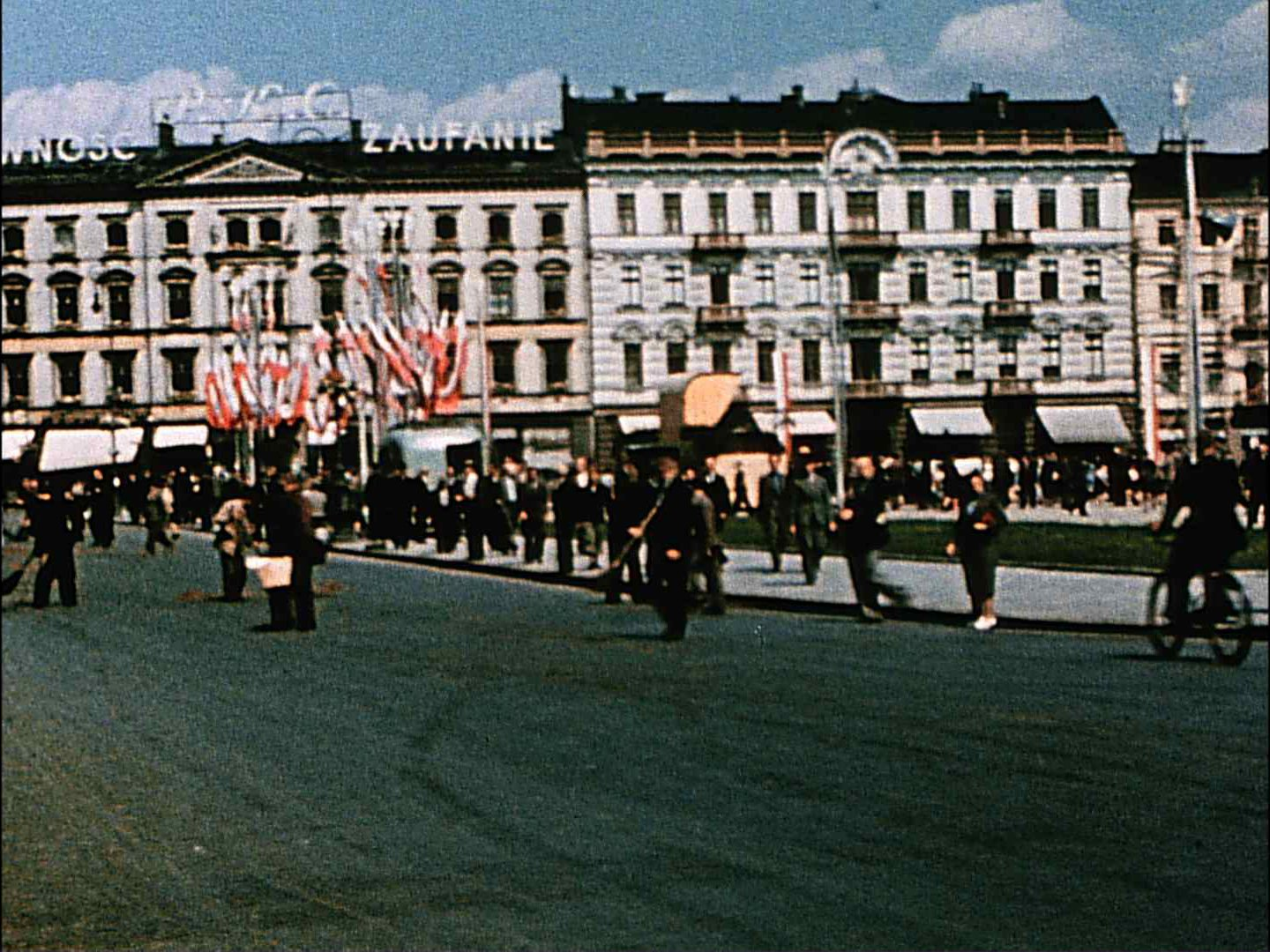
Piłsudski Square in Warsaw 1939

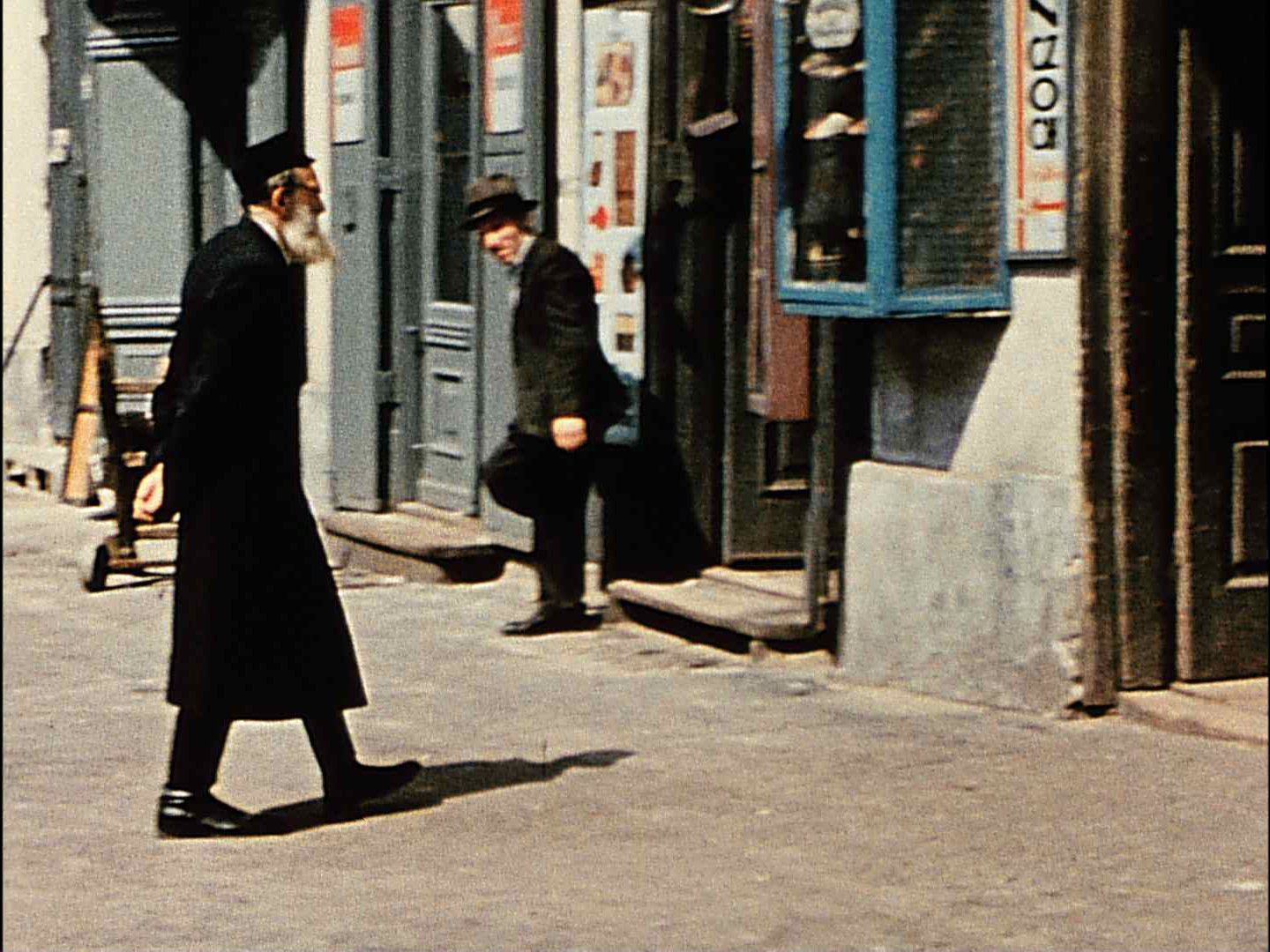
Nalewki Street in Warsaw, August 1939

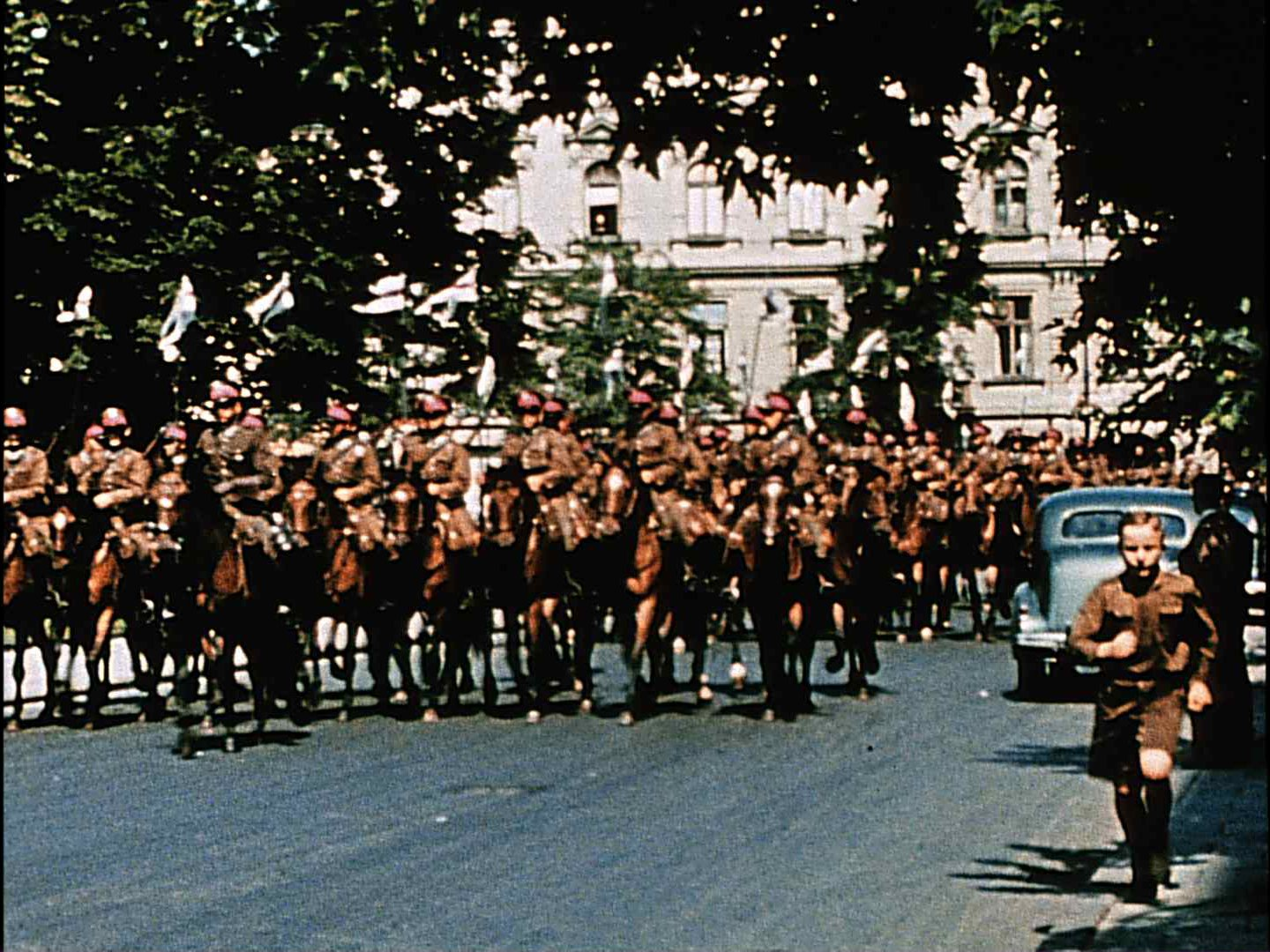
Cavalry of Poland in Warsaw, August 1939

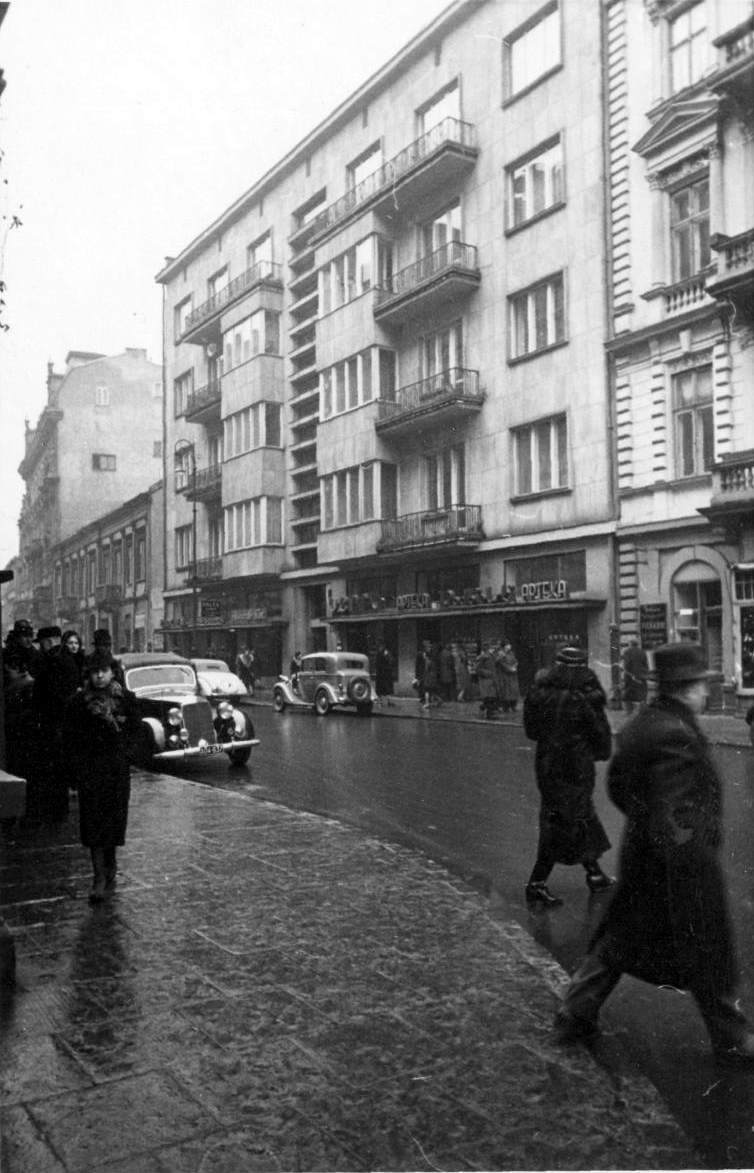
Warsaw 1939

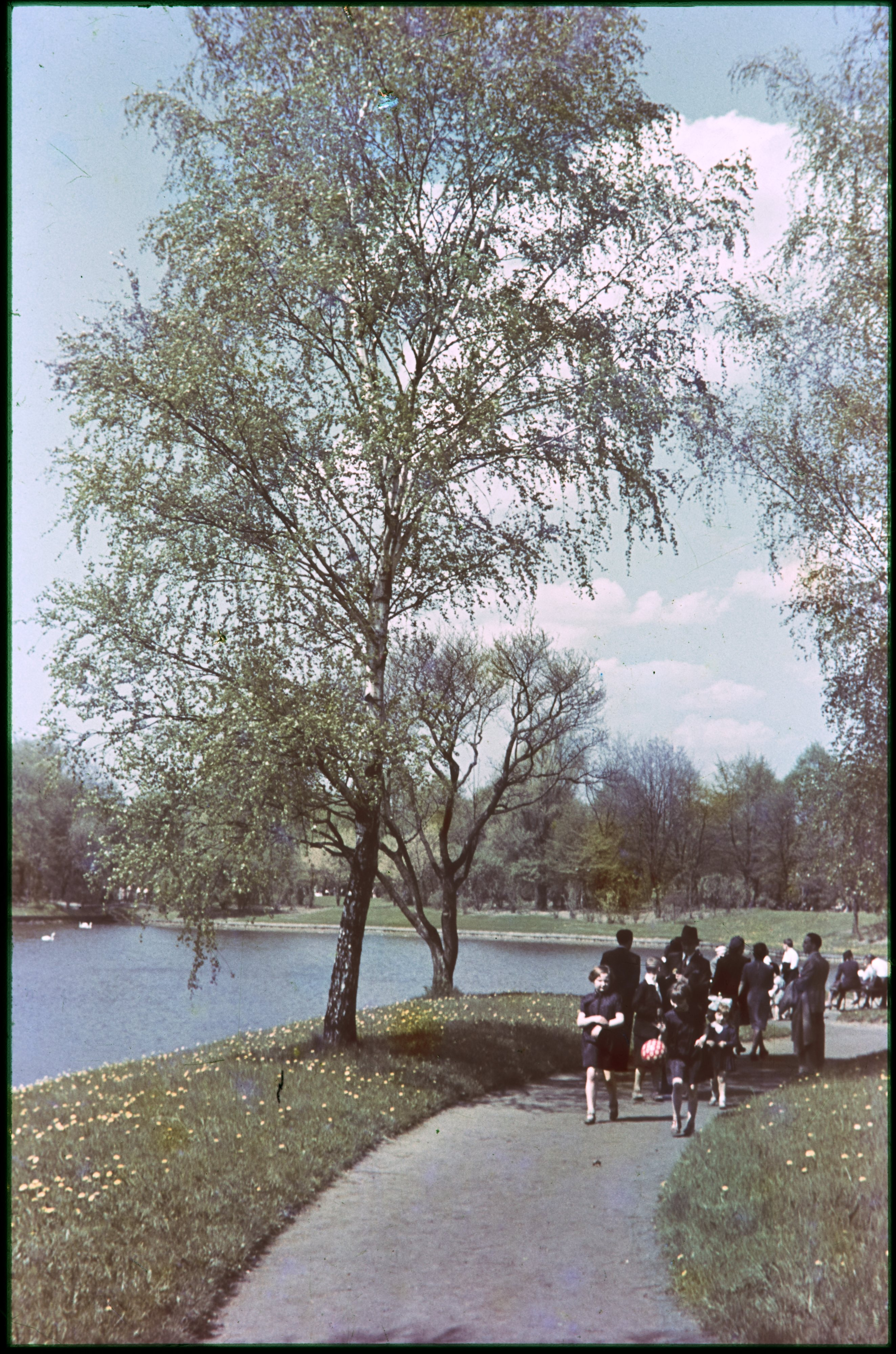
Warsaw 1939 (Agfacolor)

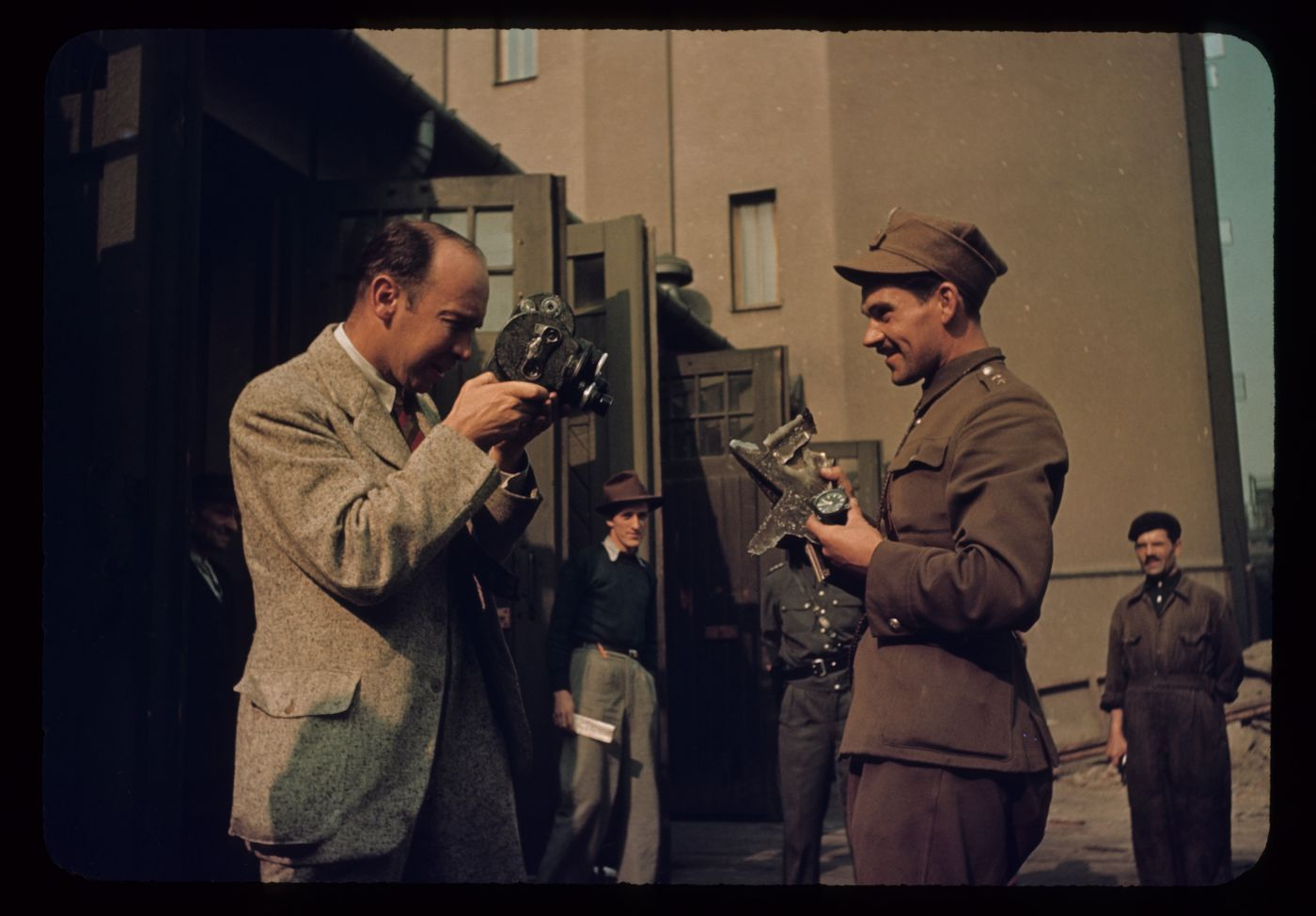
Polish Army defending Warsaw 1939 (Kodachrome)

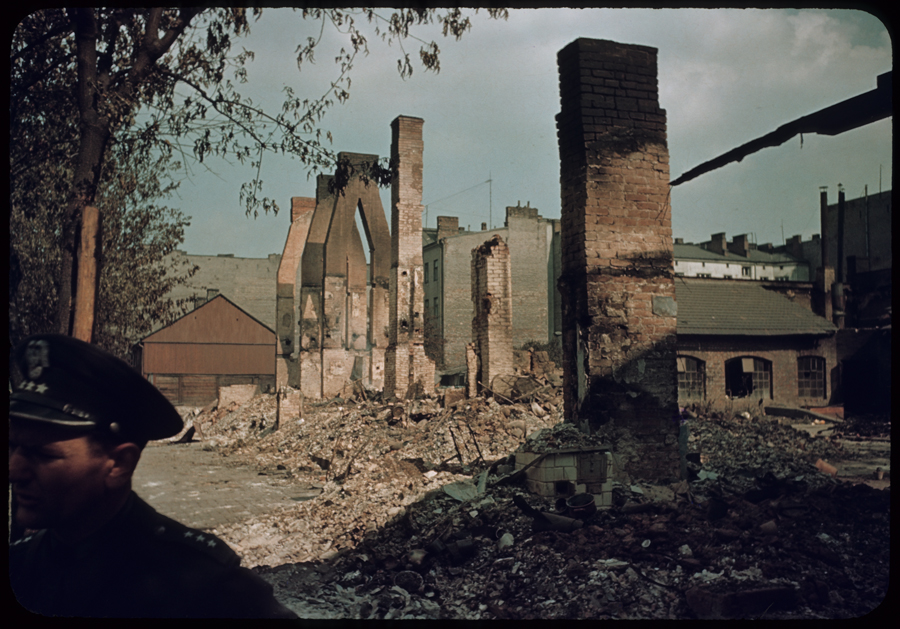
Warsaw after German bombardment in September 1939

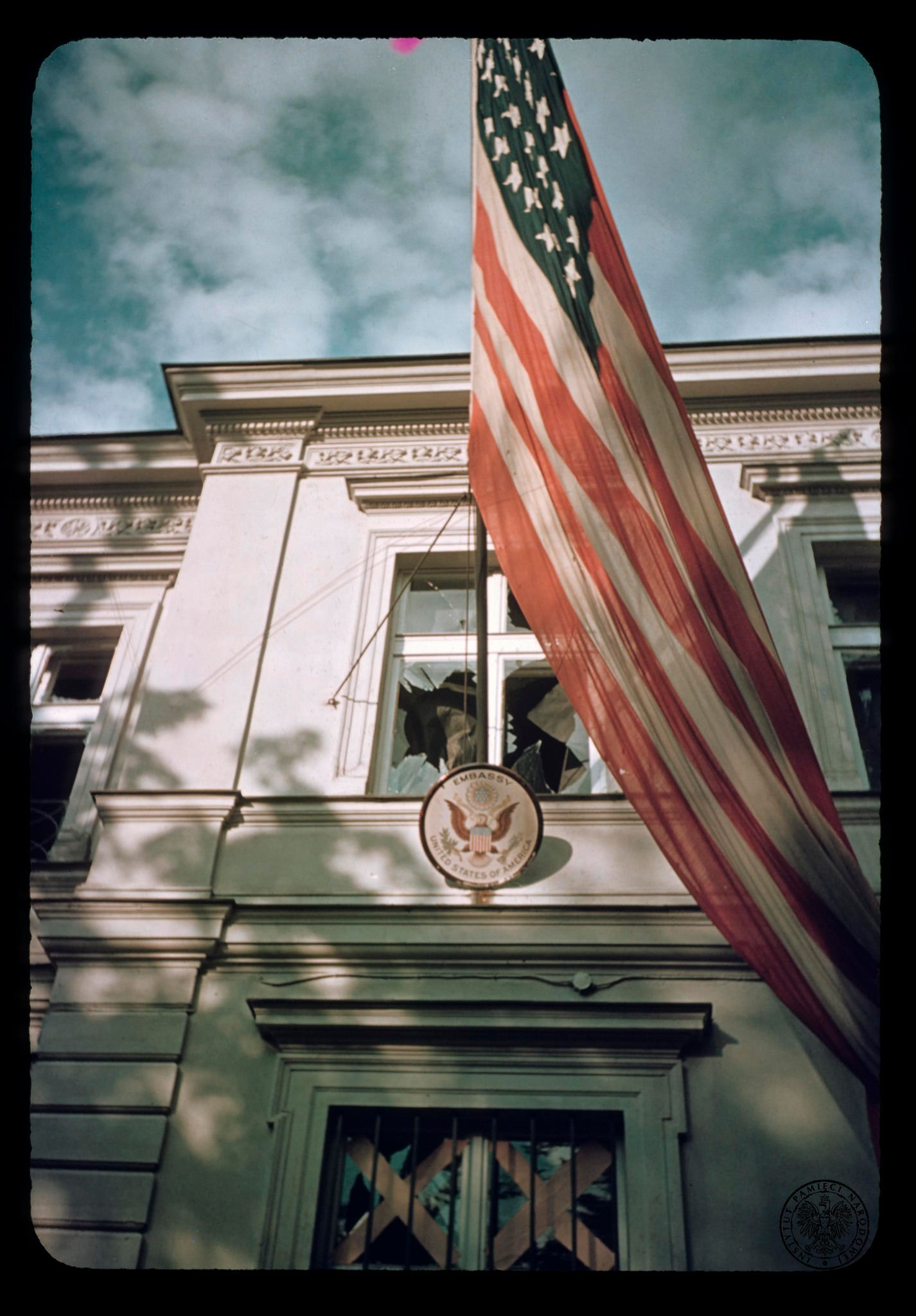
American embassy in Warsaw during German air raid in 1939

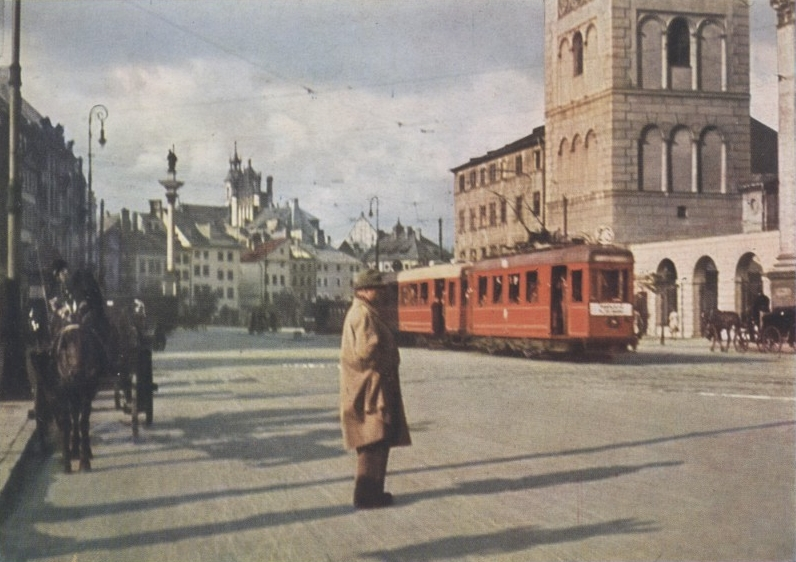
Warsaw during German occupation in 1939

Warsaw Ghetto 1940-1943

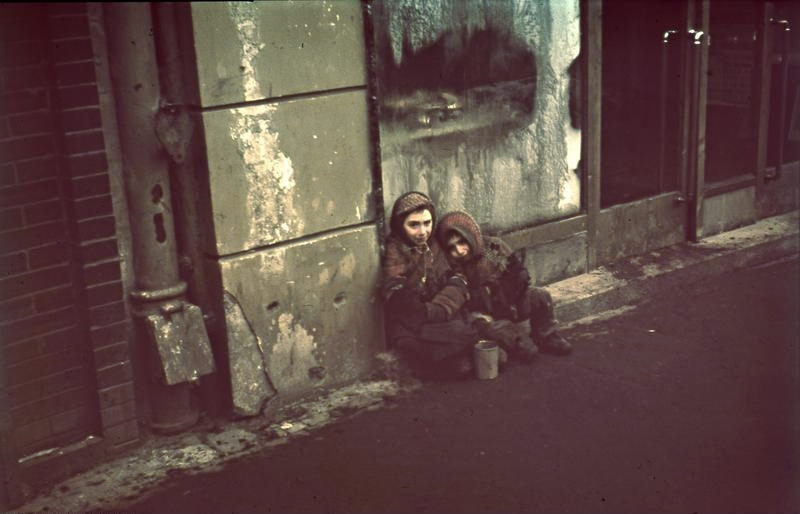
Warsaw Ghetto 1940-1943

Warsaw Ghetto 1940-1943

Warsaw Ghetto 1940-1943

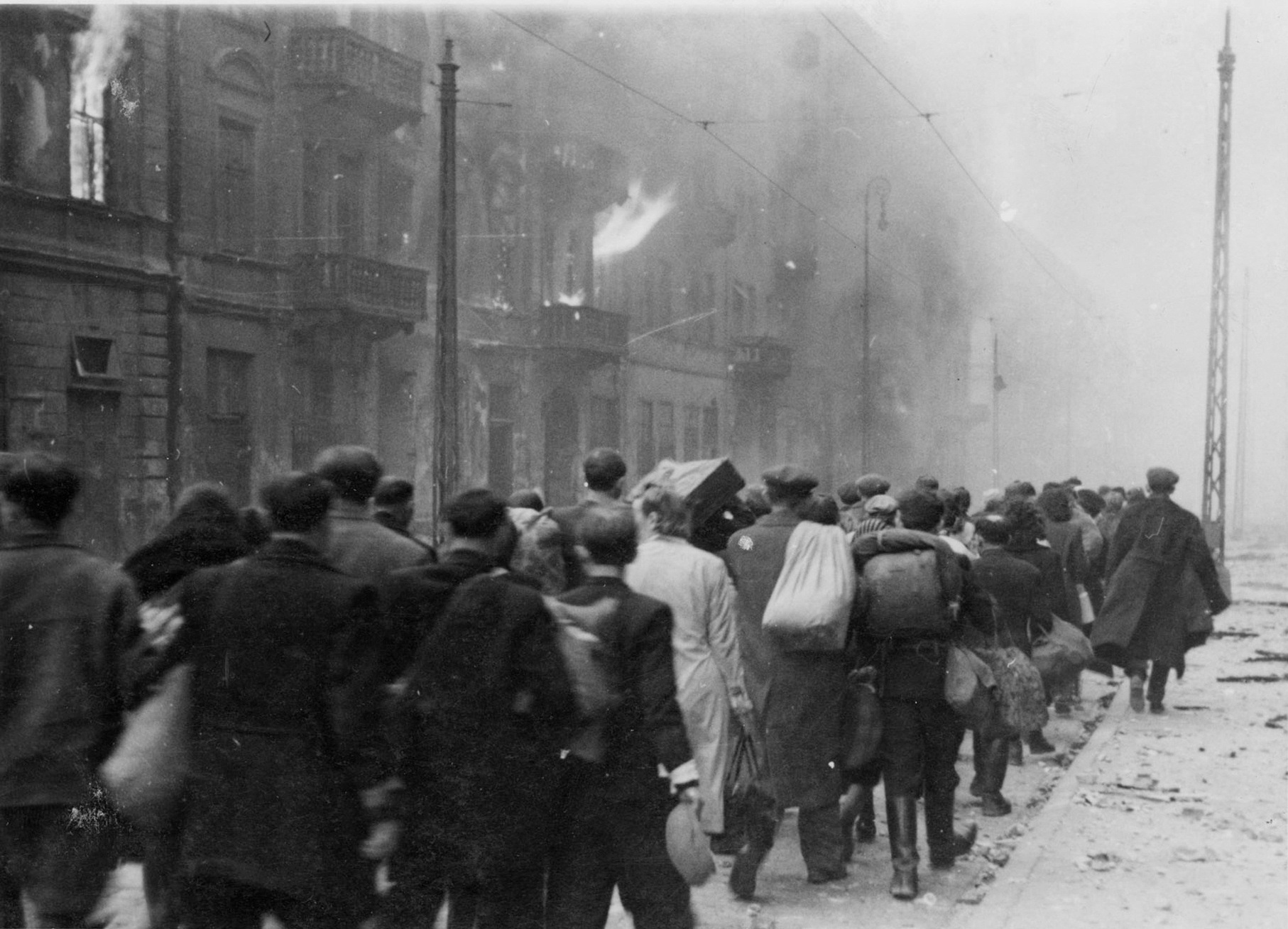
Warsaw Ghetto Uprising in 1943

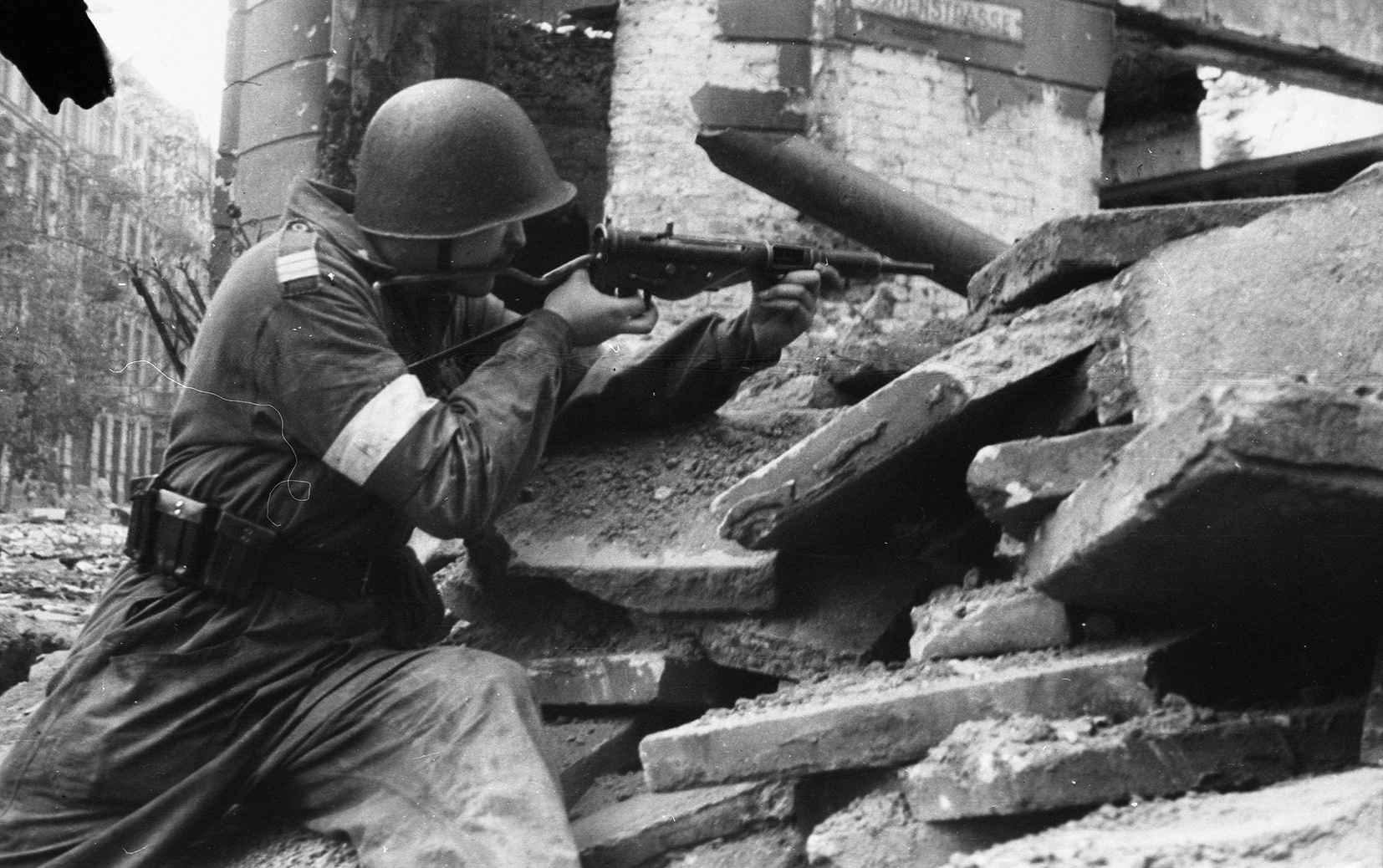
Warsaw Uprising in 1944

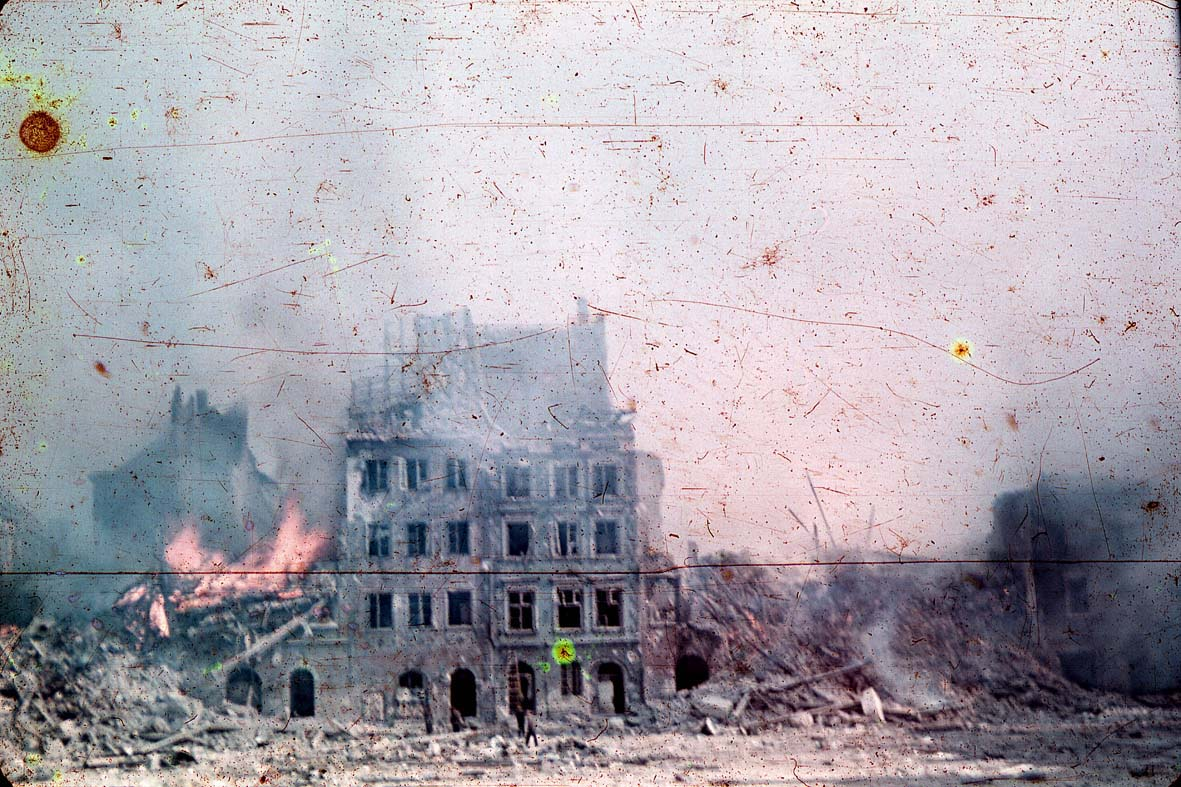
Warsaw Uprising in 1944

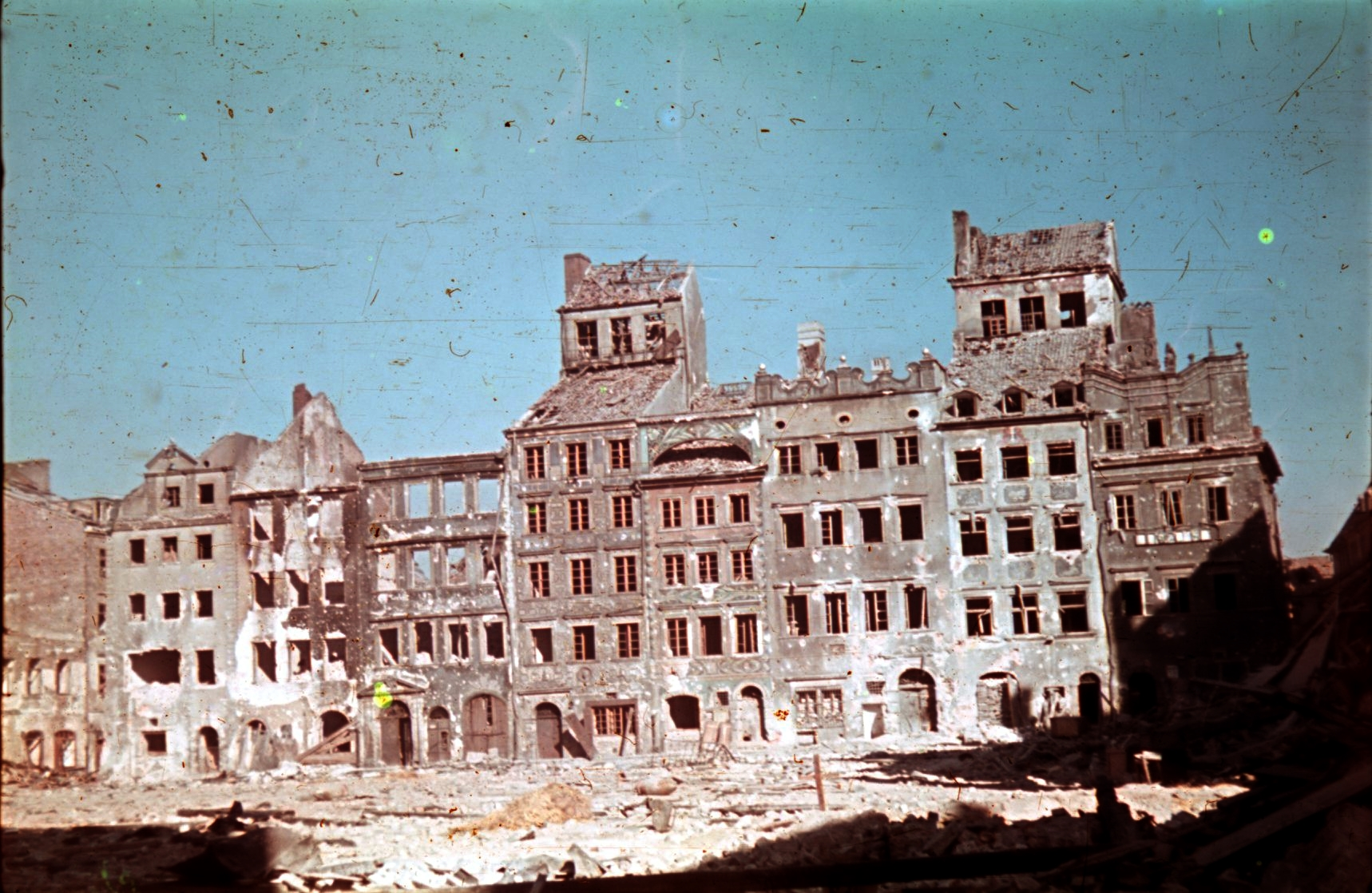
Warsaw Uprising in 1944

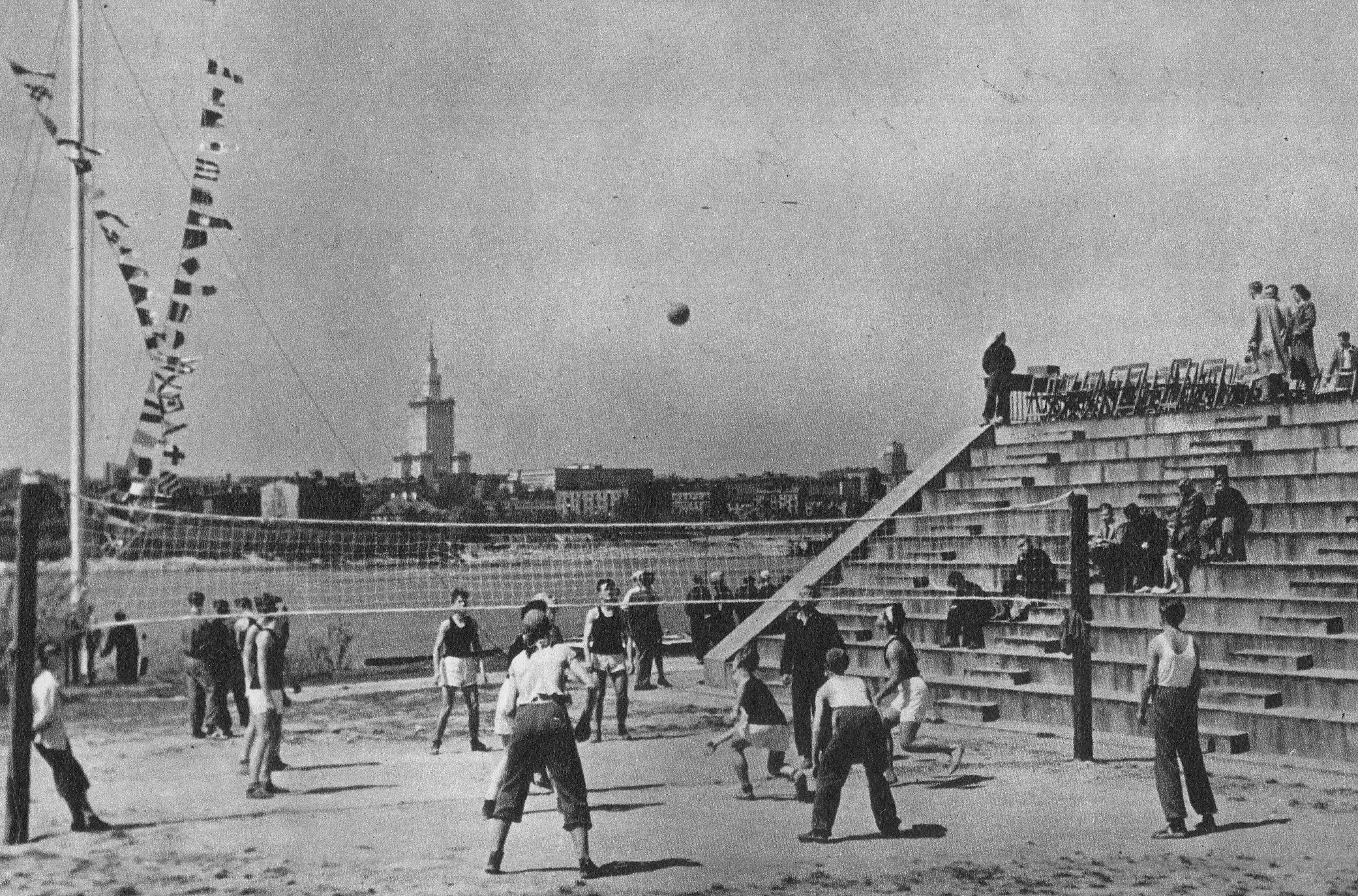
Warsaw, on the beach in the Fifties (YMCA HQ in the neighbourhood Saska Kępa).

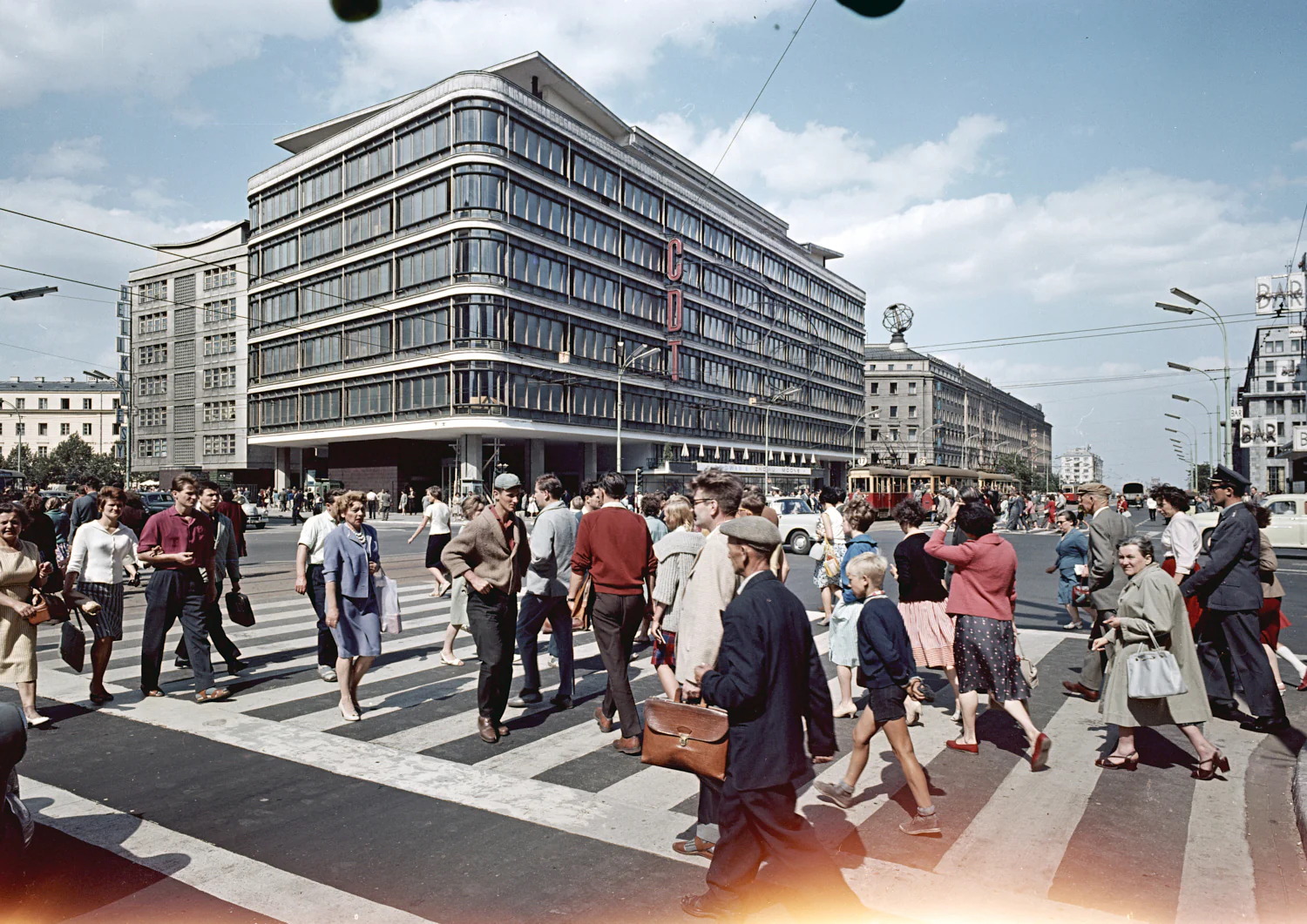
Central Department Store in Warsaw in 1962

== See also ==
- Siege of Warsaw (1939)
- Siege (1940 film)
- Warsaw concentration camp
- Warsaw Ghetto Uprising
- Warsaw Uprising
- Warsaw Pact
- List of presidents of Warsaw
- Warsaw pogrom (1881)
- Timeline of Warsaw
