= 7 Stanisława Małachowskiego Street, Sosnowiec =

Historic bank building in Sosnowiec, Poland

Coordinates: 50.2770°N 19.1308°E

Building at 7 Stanisława Małachowskiego Street in Sosnowiec
- Budynek przy ul. Małachowskiego 7 w Sosnowcu
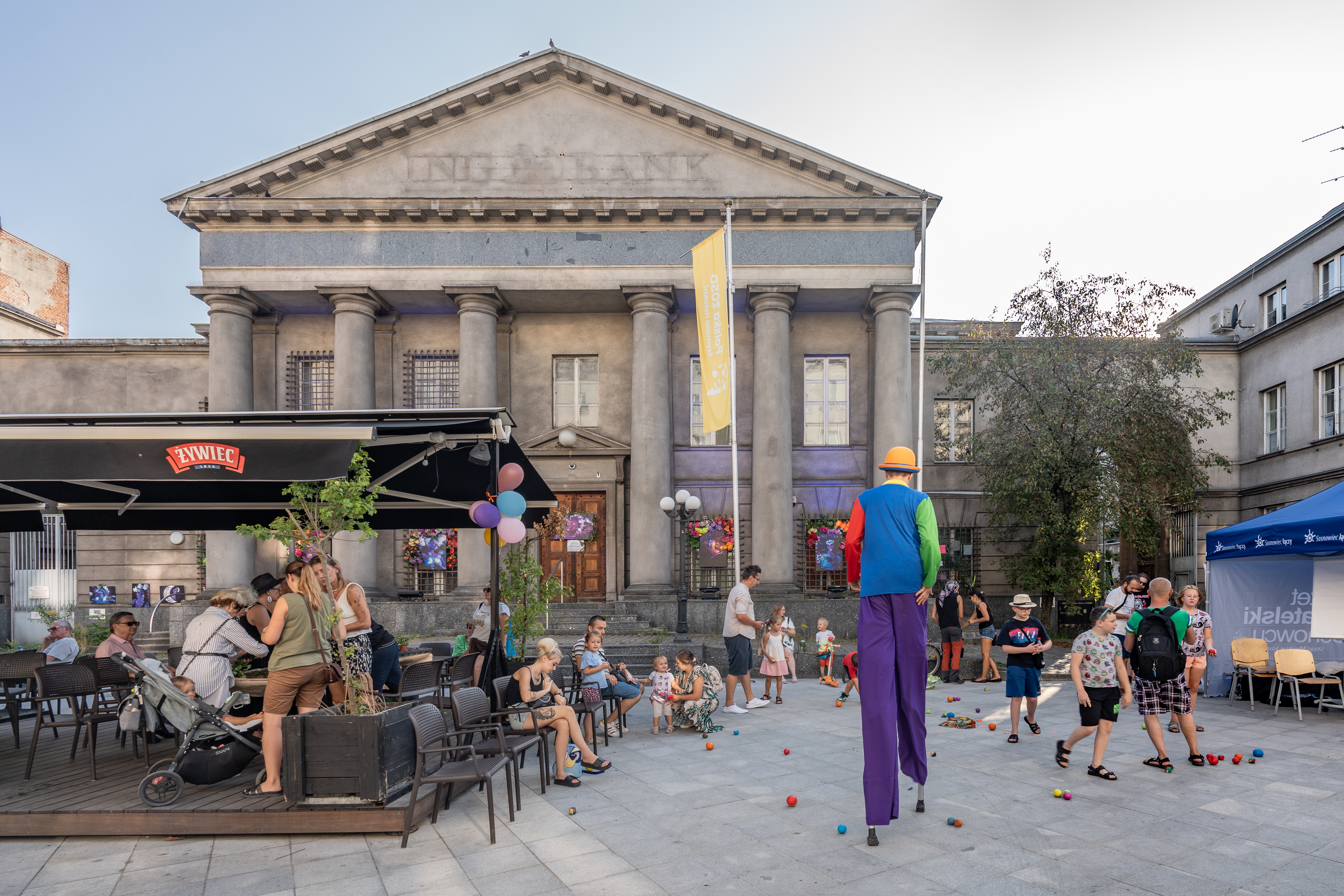
- Front façade from Małachowskiego Street
- Interactive map of the Building at 7 Stanisława Małachowskiego Street in Sosnowiec area

General information
- Architectural style: Neoclassical
- Location: 7 Stanisława Małachowskiego Street, Sosnowiec, Poland
- Construction started: 1922
- Completed: 1924
- Client: Bank Polski
- Owner: privately owned

Design and construction
- Architect: Marian Lalewicz
- Known for: former bank building; cultural venue

7 Stanisława Małachowskiego Street is a historic former bank building in Sosnowiec, Poland. It was built between 1922 and 1924 in the Neoclassical style. The building was designed by the architect Marian Lalewicz.

It was originally built as a branch of Bank Polski by the Krajowa Kasa Pożyczkowa. During the Second World War it was converted into a branch of the Reichsbank. After the war the building was used by Bank Śląski, and after the acquisition of Bank Śląski by ING Bank Śląski it became a branch of ING Bank Śląski.

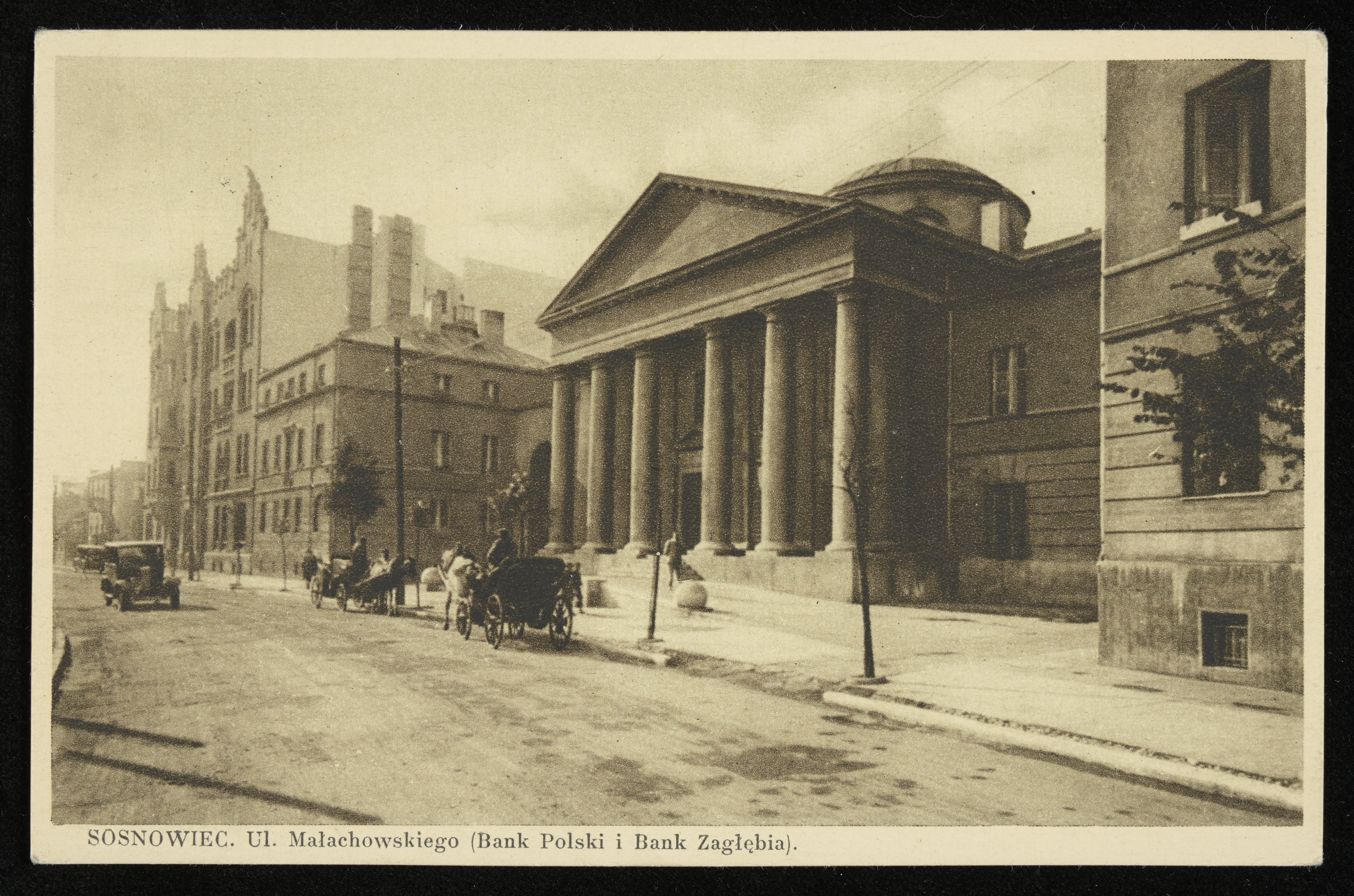
The Bank Polski and Bank Zagłębia building on Małachowskiego Street, postcard from 1926–1935

In 1992 the building was renovated and modernised according to a design by the architects Marek Franiek and Jan Skrzypek. The works included changes to the façade, the cladding of the plinth and the beam below the gable with granite, and the installation of new flooring inside the building.

In 1993 the building was entered in the Polish register of monuments under the number A/1529/93. It is surrounded by a group of residential buildings constructed mainly for bank employees; together with the former bank building they form a listed architectural complex. In 2019 ING Bank Śląski ceased to maintain a branch in the building and the property was put up for sale. In 2021 it was purchased by Marcin Majchrowicz, an entrepreneur from the Zagłębie region. At the beginning of renovation works in December 2024, a new cultural function and the name Bank Sztuki were announced during a charity fashion show by the brand Majtki z Sosnowca.

== Bank Sztuki ==
After renovation, the building began to function as Bank Sztuki ("Bank of Art"), a venue for cultural, artistic and social events. The name refers to the original banking function of the building. The new programme of use included the former banking hall, the courtyard and the preserved underground spaces of the building.

In June 2025 the building was used by Zagłębie Theatre as the performance venue for The Promised Land, based on the novel by Władysław Reymont and directed by Maja Kleczewska. The premiere took place on 14 June 2025, and the production was staged at Bank Sztuki at 7 Małachowskiego Street. In June 2026 Bank Sztuki and its courtyard were included in the programme of ZA//GŁĘBIE. Teatralny Festiwal Lokalnych Opowieści, a local theatre festival. The programme included theatre performances, post-performance meetings, screenings and a dance event in the courtyard with Kapela Fedaków and the Warsaw Sentimental Orchestra.

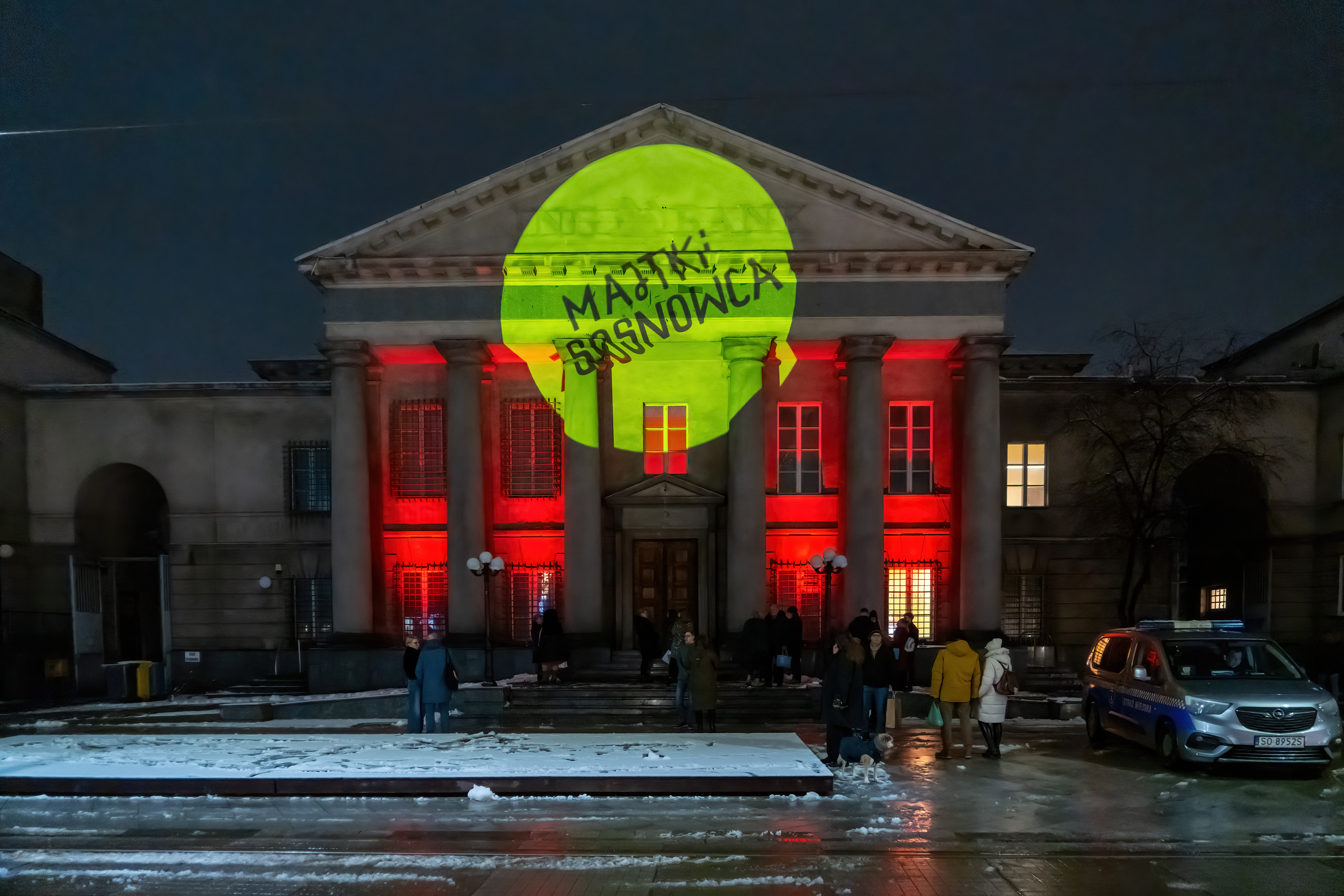
Fashion show by the brand Majtki z Sosnowca at Bank Sztuki

A civil-defence shelter has been preserved in the basement of Bank Sztuki. In May 2026, during the Long Night of Museums, a guided scenario-based tour of the shelter was organised by the group "Dzieje Polskiej Obrony Cywilnej". The programme included a presentation of the shelter's equipment, rules of conduct in emergency situations and basic evacuation procedures.

== Sosnowiec Courtyard of Art ==
In 2026 the courtyard of the complex at 7 Małachowskiego Street began to be developed as Sosnowiecki Dziedziniec Sztuki ("Sosnowiec Courtyard of Art"), complementing the programme of Bank Sztuki. The courtyard was used during events of the Zagłębie Theatre, including a dance event organised as part of the ZA//GŁĘBIE festival. Reports on the event described the space as intimate, separated from the street by gates, and suitable for stage events and ticketed performances.

The development plan for the courtyard envisages a theatre square of several hundred square metres, equipped with installations allowing the stage to be arranged in different configurations depending on the type of event. The space is intended for theatre performances, concerts, fashion shows, fairs and artistic projects.

One element of the project is a mural gallery created on the walls surrounding the courtyard. In 2026 a mural by Jacek Rykała, inspired by the painting Elisabeth Balut, was completed there. Aleksander Kozera and Miłosz Wnukowski also took part in the creation of the mural. Events accompanying its unveiling included family art workshops prepared by the Museum in Sosnowiec as part of the Sosnowiec Fun Festival programme. Remmers Polska, 41-200 Label, Kurier Miejski Sosnowiec, Sosnowieckie Wodociągi and Bank Sztuki were listed as partners and sponsors of the mural and accompanying events. Among the artists planned for later participation in the mural gallery was Mona Tusz.

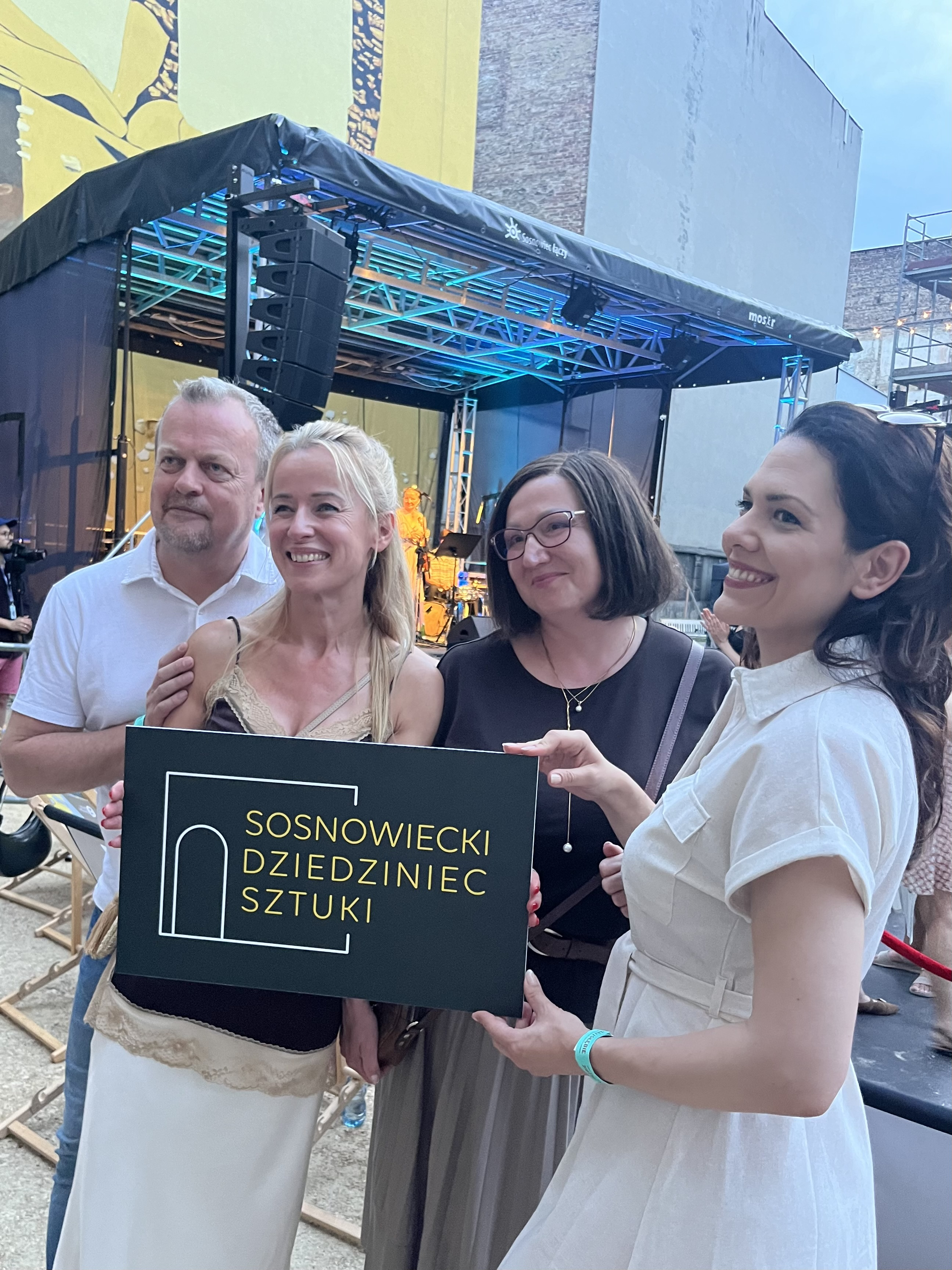
Opening of the Sosnowiec Courtyard of Art

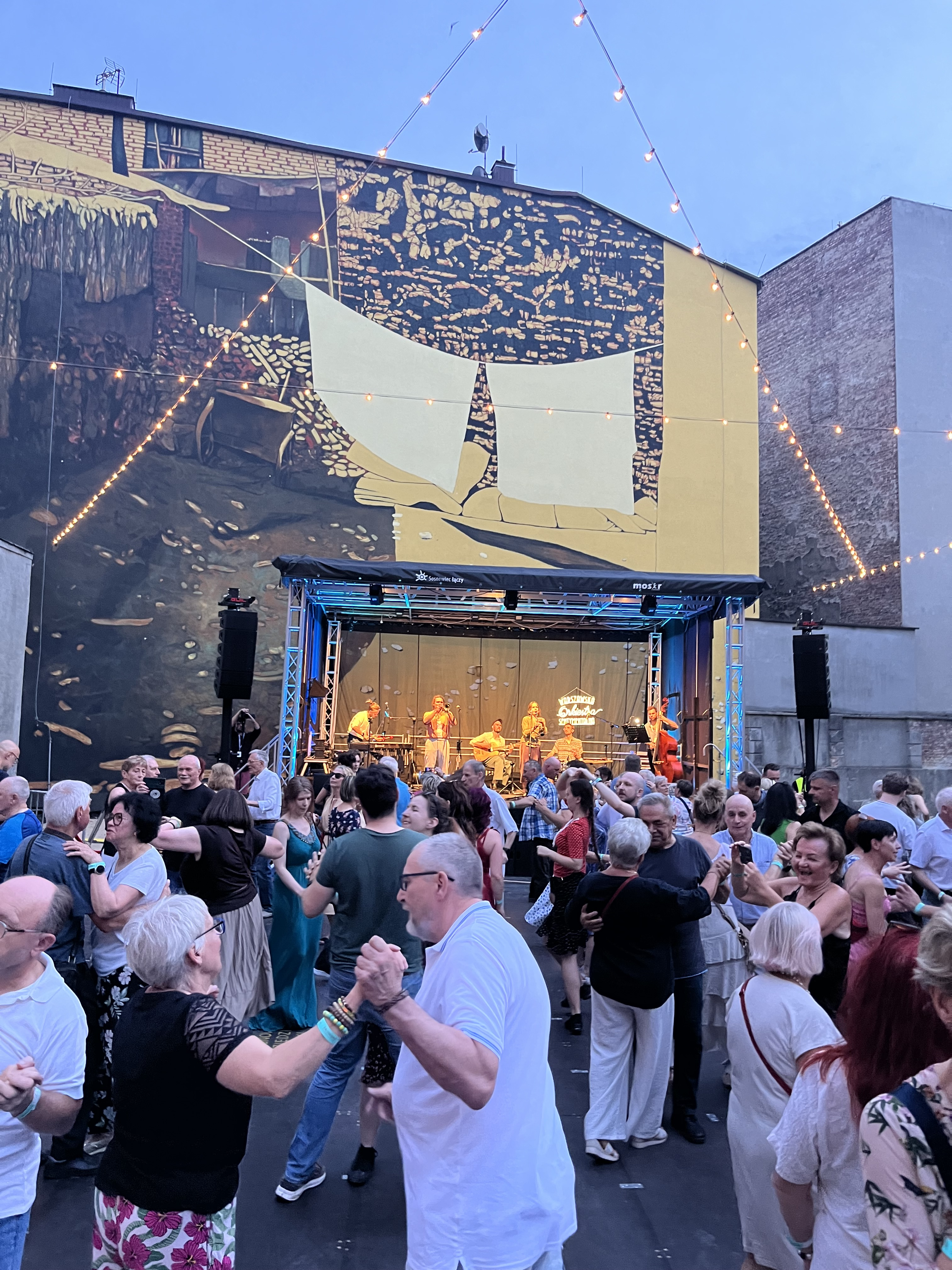
Dance event at the Sosnowiec Courtyard of Art

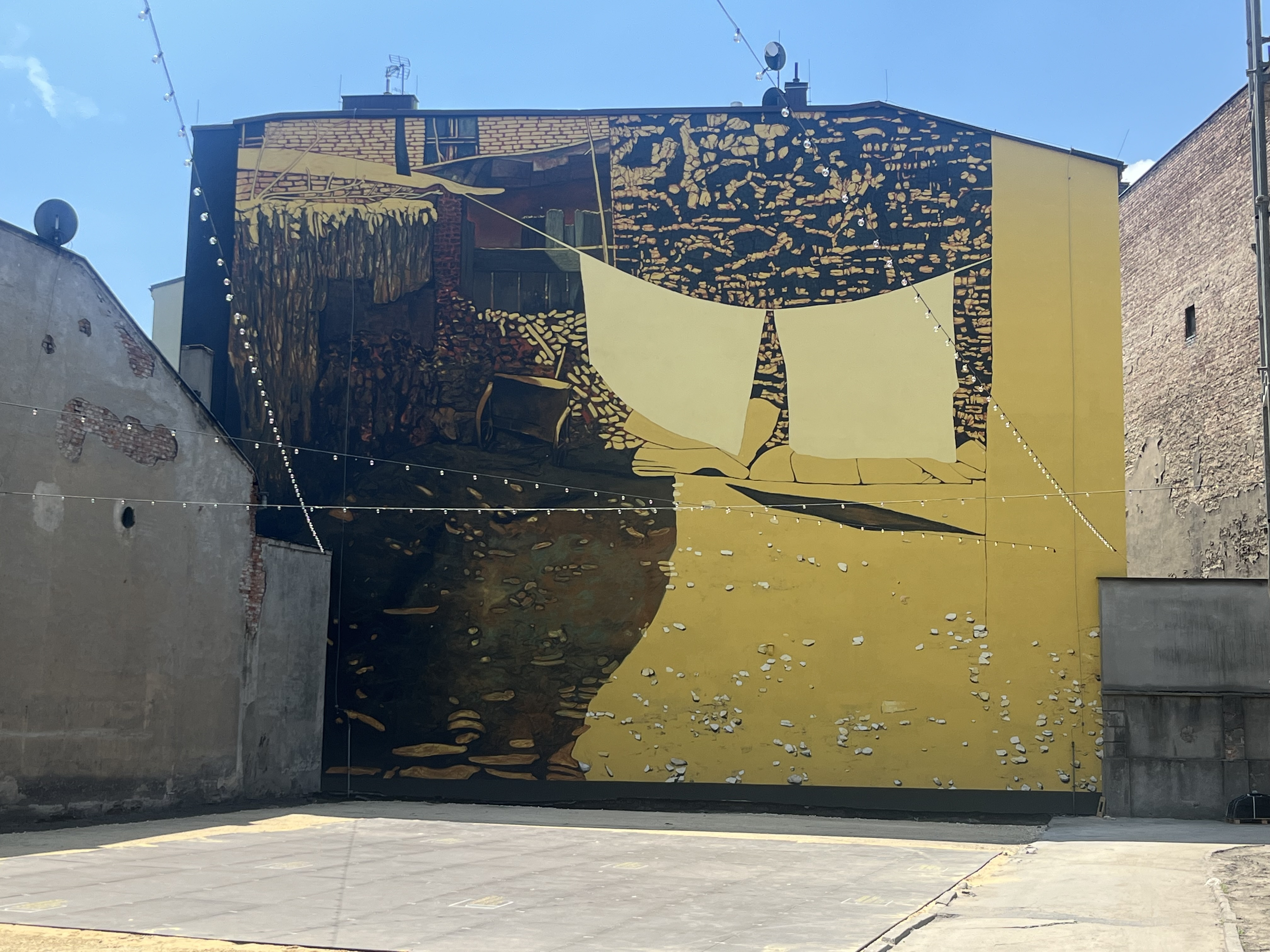
Mural by Jacek Rykała

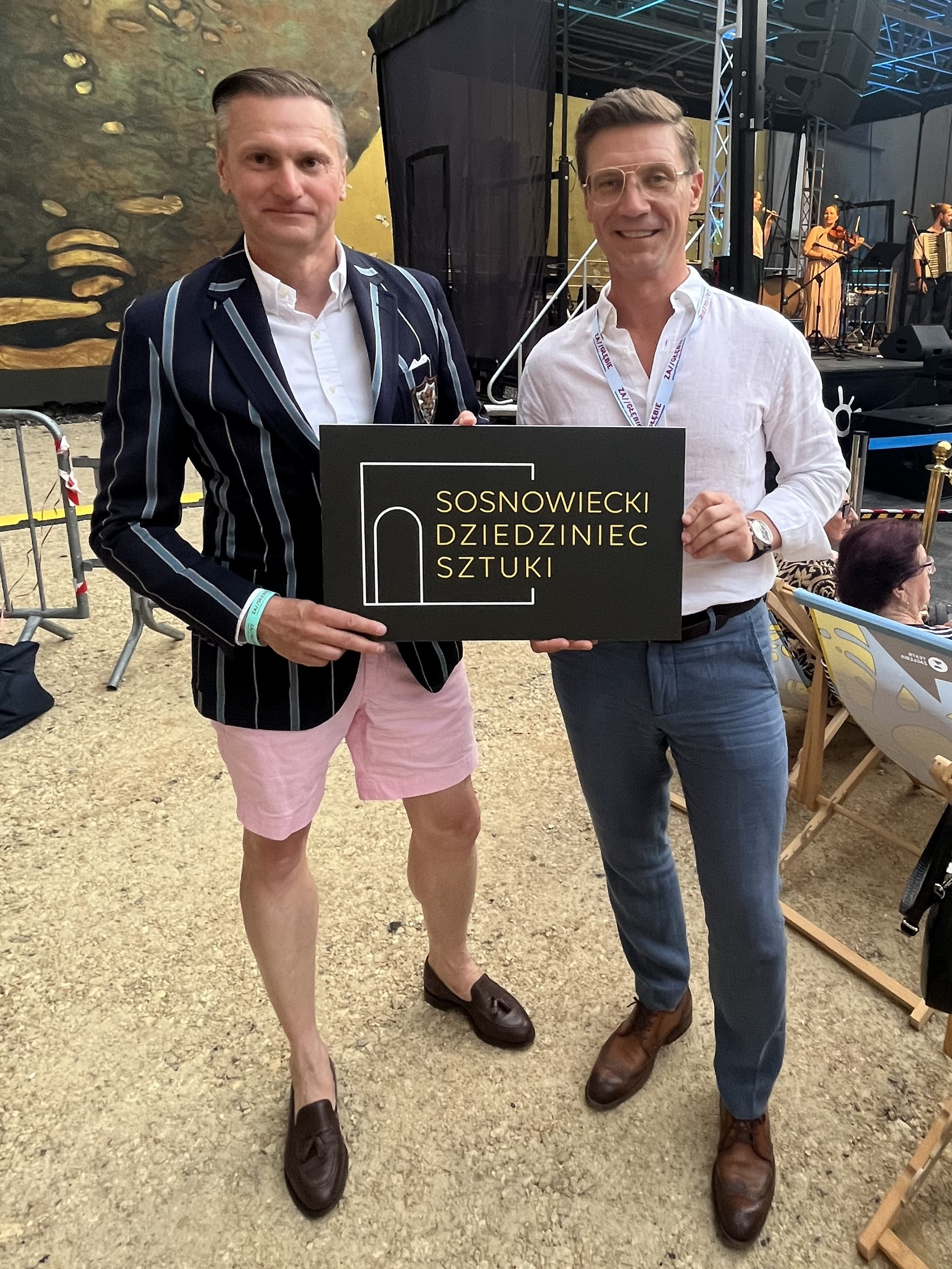
Rafał Siciński and Marcin Majchrowicz at Bank Sztuki

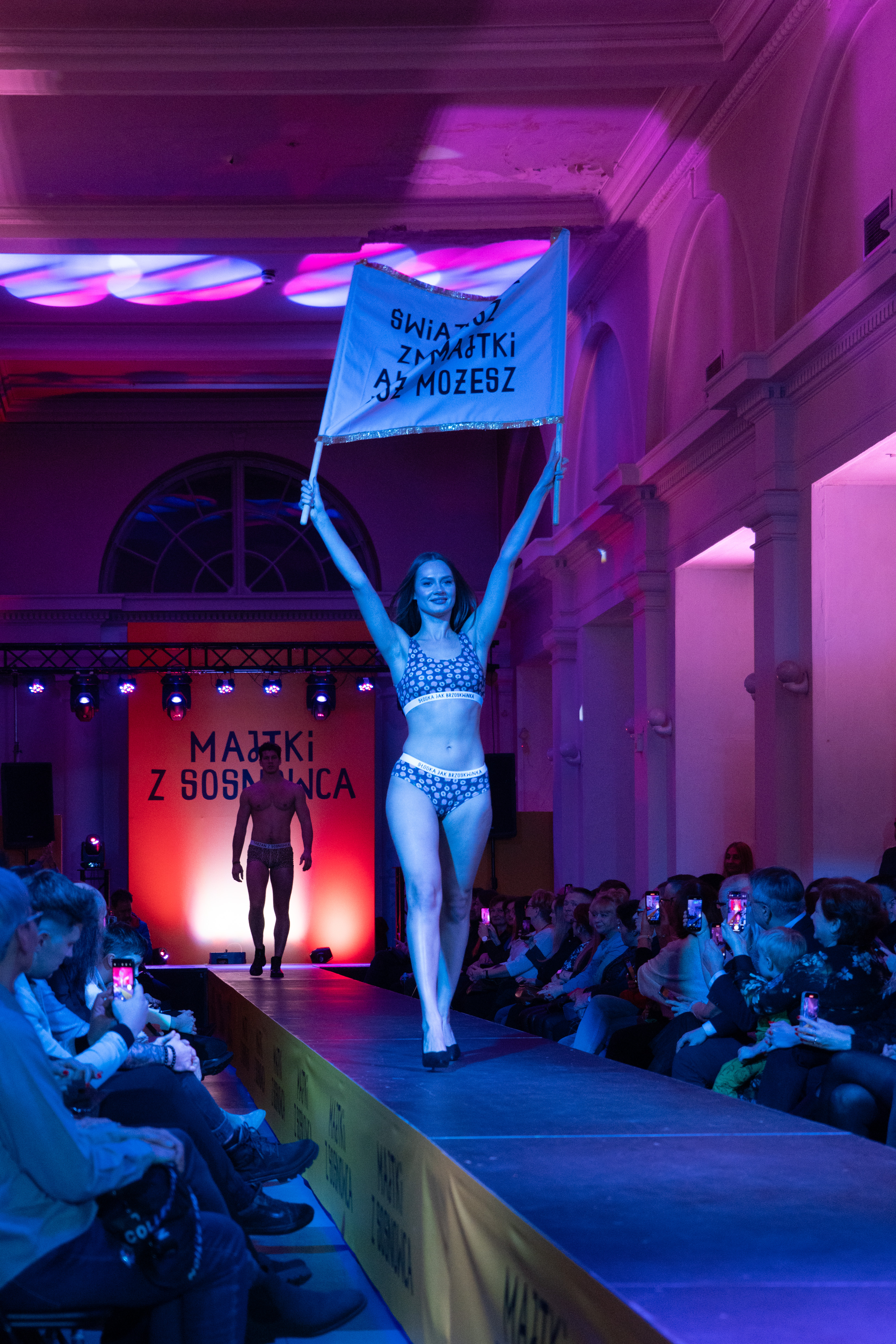
Fashion show by Majtki z Sosnowca, 6 December 2024
