= Żywiecki (surname) =

Żywiecki is a Polish surname. Notable people with the surname include:

- Aleksander Żywiecki (born 1962), Polish painter
- Alexis Zywiecki (born 1984), French footballer

== See also ==
- Zywicki
