= Aleksander Żywiecki =

Polish painter (born 1962)

- Born: 15 July 1962 (age 64); Katowice
- Known for: art, painting, landscape painting, realism, stimmung
- Notable work: The Dniestr at Mariapol at dusk, oil on canvas, 65cmx110cm 2010Frozen Brook, oil on canvas, 38cmx90cm, 2013
- Website: www.facebook.com/alzyw

Aleksander Żywiecki (born 15 July 1962) is a Polish painter specializing in realist landscape painting

== Life ==
=== Education ===
Aleksander Żywiecki was born In Katowice. In the years 1977-82 he attended the Specialist Art Secondary School in Katowice. Then he studied in the Faculty of Graphics at the Katowice branch of the Cracow Academy of Fine Arts (1982–88), under the direction of Jacek Rykała for painting and drawing, Adam Romaniuk for Graphical Design, and Stanisław Gawron in Graphics, which he presented in his Diploma project.

=== Exhibitions ===
As a student Aleksander Żywiecki contributed to numerous exhibitions and art competitions, including the Tenth All-Polish Students Graphic Competition and the Second All-Polish Students New Different Book Exhibition, Poznań, where he won awards. After graduation he was invited by owners of European and world galleries; he presented his works in Germany (the post-plein air exhibition in Sahlmule, 1993), in Belgium (Gallery Centre Culturel Jean Degous, Beloeil, Belgium 2001) and in the USA (Anya Tish Gallery, Houston, USA 2000)

Author of over 30 individual exhibitions in Poland, of which the most important include: exhibition in the gallery Arkada, Wrocław, 1997, cyclical exhibitions in the gallery Kocioł Artystyczny, Cracow (1997, 1999, 2002, 2006), exhibition in Galeria Sztuki Chorzów 2007, retrospective exhibition in Silesian Museum in Katowice (1999), exhibition in the Polish Radio Katowice (Na Żywo, Katowice, 2003), retrospective exhibition in the gallery Panorama (Tomaszowice near Cracow, 2010) and an exhibition in Galeria Sztuki Współczesnej, Kołobrzeg 2013.

the full list of individual exhibitions:

- gallery ARS Catholica. Katowice 1995.
- gallery 6. Gliwice 1995.
- gallery Arkada, Wrocław 1995.
- gallery Kolor, Bytom 1996.
- gallery Art-Nova 1, Katowice 1996.
- gallery Arkada, Wrocław 1997.
- gallery Kocioł Artystyczny, Kraków 1997.
- gallery Kocioł Artystyczny, Kraków 1999.
- Silesian Museum in Katowice 1999.
- gallery Kowadło, Katowice 2000.
- Centre Culturel Jean Degous, Beloeil, Belgia 2001.
- gallery Atelier, Chorzów 2002.
- gallery Kowadło, Katowice 2002.
- gallery Kocioł Artystyczny, Kraków 2002.
- gallery of Polish Radio Katowice Na żywo, Katowice 2003.
- gallery Kocioł Artystyczny, Kraków 2006.
- gallery Galeria Sztuki MM, Chorzów 2007
- Tomaszowice Manour, Tomaszowice near Cracow, 2010
- gallery "Na Wprost", Iława 2011
- gallery Wieża Sztuki, Kielce, 2013
- Galeria Sztuki Współczesnej, Kołobrzeg 2013

=== Plein air ===
Aleksander Żywiecki is a plein air artist. He participated in plein air sessions in Poland in such places as the Biebrza Valley, Kraków-Częstochowa Upland, Polesie, the Białowieża Forest and Ujście Warty National Park. In the years 2008 and 2009 he traveled several times to Ukraine to the regions of the former Kresy (Eastern Borderlands). At that period he made multiple drawings and oil paintings presenting the Dniestr landscape. Among the paintings created at that time is "The Dniestr at Mariampol at Dusk", which is one of the most prominent works in the output of that artist.

== Painting and Drawing ==
=== Inspirations ===
At the source of Aleksander Żywiecki's art lies his fascination with the aesthetics and poetics of the Stimmung landscape painting of the Munich School of the late Nineteenth and the early Twentieth century, where the emotional and climatic visions of the wild nature are identified with the "inner landscape" of emotional states of the human soul.

=== Features of the Style, Subject Matter ===
In the 1980s, in the early period of his career, the artist used to create abstract postmodern art and to experiment with the modern media and atypical materials. But, as Jerzy Madeyski reports, the young painter "soon noticed that abstract art can only render the most general impressions and feelings, and that wasn't enough for him. Abstract art started to be boring and palled on him."

In the early 1990s he focussed on nature which since that time became the sole theme of his painting. Simultaneously he gave up formal experiments and decided to paint landscape applying the traditional artistic techniques.

The nature in Żywiecki's paintings exists apart from man and is free from human influence. As Madeyski comments, Aleksander Żywiecki "paints unpeopled landscapes, unspoiled by the once fashionable or even indispensable prop or vestige of human activity." In his works nature is barren, wild and it appears in various moods; sometimes it is hostile and brutally dramatic, sometimes calm, mild, even idyllic. In whatever aspect it shows itself to the viewer, it always remains independent and primeval, unadulterated by the civilisation, unsubdued by man.

The nature in the artist's paintings is supposed to play the role which had been once attributed to it by the Romantic and the Polish landscape painters, the representatives of the Munich school: its task is to express, through its mood, the states of the artist mind. Jerzy Madeyski elaborates on this expressionistic aspect of landscape both in the older Masters and in Żywiecki's art:

"The young artists discovered (that) in landscape (there) was what they wanted to see in it unblemished beauty and the opportunity for a fuller self expression. For the real landscape, painted out of the heartfelt need, is perhaps the most sincere form of the artist's selfportrait, free of all postures or even affectation. Naturally it is an inner portrait, which reflects his entire personality and all of his dreams and ideals. The similarity between the art of Aleksander Żywiecki and his [romantic and postromantic] predecessors' art is neither random nor superficial"

Żywiecki, now a painter of the views of nature, was no longer experimenting with unusual modern media, but turned to traditional style and realism. His focus on the techniques that had been recognized for hundreds of years in painting, his insistence on realism is mentioned by Maciej Szczawiński in his essay "The Dangerous Journey" which acts as an introductory word to the artist's album "Studia I Szkice." Szczawiński writes:

"realistic painting in particular. Zywiecki; or considerable courage. We need add solitude (whatever happens "in opposition to" in fine art, most often doesn't recognise crowds or groups). But after all it is our support in well hidden longing for emotion, naturalness, truth and mystery. Mystery does not have to mean cascading manner and theoretical and conceptual hokus-pokus. Its reflection — which enables encounter and entry into the depth — examines itself especially nowadays in the dense matter of "the low". In the particles and glimmer of the real. In what whispers, and sometimes cries out to us: clouds and walls, wet soil and arid sand's breath which pulses in fissures of bark and cracks of flesh. Zywiecki risked going back. That means he did not set off in search of a new language (the word "new" seems to be an identifier of intellectual kitsch and self-advertising deception of). Instead he took a close look at the Polish tradition of landscape painting from the end of 19th and the beginning of the 20th century. (...) The bend of a river in one of the paintings emanated reality (REALITY) . As did the bliss of cumuli over a field. Or the twilight of autumn air. In other words, reality was unreal in these paintings, innumerable in the serious, unhurried sense of things that matter, authen-tic things"

In his mature works the painter's style becomes synthetic; his objective on the formal side is maximum simplicity. Material objects and narrative elements, considered redundant, are eliminated. The landscape becomes reduced to immaterial forces of nature and ungraspable impressions such as vast vacuous spaces, the darkness in the heart of woods or atmospheric phenomena e.g. the pre-storm blackness of heavens, the mist or the gust of wind during torrential rain.

=== Group 4 Landscapes ===
In July 2012 Aleksander Żywiecki initiated the 4 Landscapes group, which included: Aleksander Żywiecki, Andrzej Kacperek, Paweł Kotwicz and Jan Wołek. Aleksander Żywiecki was the co-author of the group's manifesto stating that an important aim of the group 4 Landscapes is to stop the monopoly of the art promoted by the 21st century Academia and to pave way for all contemporary tendencies in painting, including those whose objective is to give aesthetic pleasure ad arouse emotions.

=== Drawing ===
Apart from oil paintings Aleksander Żywiecki's output includes also drawings. Many of the sketches were executed with the graphite pencil or, more often, with a broad graphite bar, the tool which enabled the artist to achieve painterly effects. Multiple drawings are studies for paintings but many of them function as independent finished works and are treated on equal basis with the artist's paintings. The largest collections of drawings are those representing the Białowieża Forest or the Rogalin Oks or the works made in Polesie and the Biebrza Marshes.

== Bibliography ==
- Madeyski Jerzy, "Introduction" in: Aleksander Żywiecki, Malarstwo. Polskie Pejzaże, Kraków: Biuro Informacyjno-Prawne AKCEPT S.A., 2000, ISBN 83-911759-0-1.
- Oracz Marta, "Aleksander Żywiecki", in: Inicjatywy Gospodarcze, Ogólnopolski Magazyn Społeczno-Gospodarczy nr 1 (50), March 2014. ISSN 1641-2931, pp. 22–23.
- Szczawiński Maciej M., "Niebezpieczna podróż" in: Aleksander Żywiecki Studia i Szkice, Katowice: Polskie Radio Katowice, 2003, ISBN 83-915545-6-2.
- Żywiecki Aleksander, "Po co nam ta sztuka" in: Nasze Kontakty. Regiony Europy i Świata, December 2012, ISSN 1429-8422. pp. 47–50.
- Brol Edyta "Nie tworzę dla krytyków" - interview with Aleksander Żywiecki in: Słowo Polskie, Dolnośląska Gazeta Codzienna, Wrocław, Jelenia Góra, Legnica, Wałbrzych, Ind. 350 419, 6. 09. 1995
- Dereń Ewa, "Nie kreuję nowych światów. Rozmowa z Aleksandrem Żywieckim, śląskim malarzem pejzażystą; Mecenat
- "Śląski malarz-pejzażysta i jego mecenasi", in: Górnośląski Informator Kulturalny, No. 2, March, 2001,
