= Jacek Rykała =

Polish painter and theatre artist

- Born: 1 September 1950 (age 76); Sosnowiec, Poland
- Education: Jan Matejko Academy of Fine Arts
- Known for: Painting, drawing, painted objects, poetry, drama, theatre direction, stage design
- Awards: Gold Cross of Merit; Gold Medal for Merit to Culture – Gloria Artis; Silver Medal for Merit to Culture – Gloria Artis
- Website: www.jacekrykala.com

Jacek Rykała (born 1 September 1950 in Sosnowiec) is a Polish painter, draughtsman, author of painted objects, poet, playwright, theatre director, stage designer and educator. He is a professor of painting at the Academy of Fine Arts in Katowice, where he served as vice-rector from 2005 to 2012 and headed Painting Studio I. His work combines oil painting, collage, photographs, elements of everyday objects, theatre activities and works in public space. He is the author of the plays Dom przeznaczony do wyburzenia, Mleczarnia and Chłodne poranki.

== Biography ==
In 1968 Rykała graduated from Bolesław Prus Secondary School No. 3 in Sosnowiec, and in 1976 from the Faculty of Graphic Arts in Katowice of the Academy of Fine Arts in Kraków. Since the 1970s he has been connected with the academic art community in Katowice; at the Academy of Fine Arts in Katowice he taught in a painting studio for nearly fifty years.

The subject matter of his works is shaped by the eastern part of Upper Silesia and the Dąbrowa Basin, including courtyards, gates, walls, stairs, urban backstreets and places associated with childhood memories and changes in urban space. In his paintings and painted objects he uses fragments of old buildings and furnishings, family and archival photographs, house numbers, street-name plates, pieces of doors, window frames, boards and other material traces of everyday life. His works combine the urban landscape with collage and objects, while human presence is often evoked indirectly through abandoned things, photographs and architectural details. Cycles and themes present in his work include benches, gates, windows, courtyards, landscapes, Podszepty dzielnicy Sielec, Światła Środuli, Rezydencje, Lśnienie, Żółte światło pustych miejsc and Chłodne poranki. In a regional context, his work deals with the memory of places, traces of former residents, the experience of time and the space of Sosnowiec and the Dąbrowa Basin, including the districts of Sielec and Środula.

Rykała's works have been shown in Poland and abroad in more than 50 solo exhibitions and 250 group exhibitions, as well as at several dozen art fairs, including Art Frankfurt, Art Köln and Art Chicago. More recent summaries of his exhibition record mention over 80 solo exhibitions and participation in more than 300 art exhibitions. In 2002 he held a retrospective exhibition at the National Museum, Kraków, the first retrospective of a living artist in that institution. His major solo exhibitions included Podszepty dzielnicy Sielec at the BWA Contemporary Art Gallery in Katowice and the Polish Institute in Vienna, Lśnienie at the Studio Art Centre in Warsaw and the Polish Institute in Rome, ...Popołudnia niedzielne napięte ciszą pustych ulic i placów... at the National Museum in Kraków, Bilder, Objekte, Collagen at the Stadtmuseum Düsseldorf, Arrested Time – painting, graphics at TW007 Art Gallery in New York, Cose poco importanti, avvenimenti insignificanti at Galleria d’Arte Il Tempo in Bologna, and Żółte światło pustych miejsc at the Sosnowiec Art Centre – Sielecki Castle.

In Poland his works are held, among other collections, by the National Museum, Warsaw, the National Museum in Kraków, the National Museum, Poznań, the National Museum, Szczecin, the Muzeum Sztuki, Łódź, the Silesian Museum in Katowice, the Jagiellonian University Museum in Kraków, the Lubusz Land Museum in Zielona Górze, municipal museums in Sosnowiec, Jaworzno and Chorzów, the Studio Art Centre in Warsaw, the Volker Feierabend collection intended for the Sprengel Museum in Hanover, and private collections in several dozen countries.

Since 2005 Rykała has staged his own plays. At the Silesian Theatre in Katowice he prepared Dom przeznaczony do wyburzenia as author, director and stage designer; the premiere took place on 4 June 2005 on the Scena w Malarni stage. In 2007, at the same theatre, he directed Mleczarnia, for which he also prepared the musical arrangement and multimedia projections. In 2012, at the Teatr Zagłębia in Sosnowiec, he staged Chłodne poranki as playwright, director, author of the musical arrangement and costume designer. Rykała's theatre work develops motifs present in his painting, including the house, demolition, memory of place and the disappearance of old urban space.

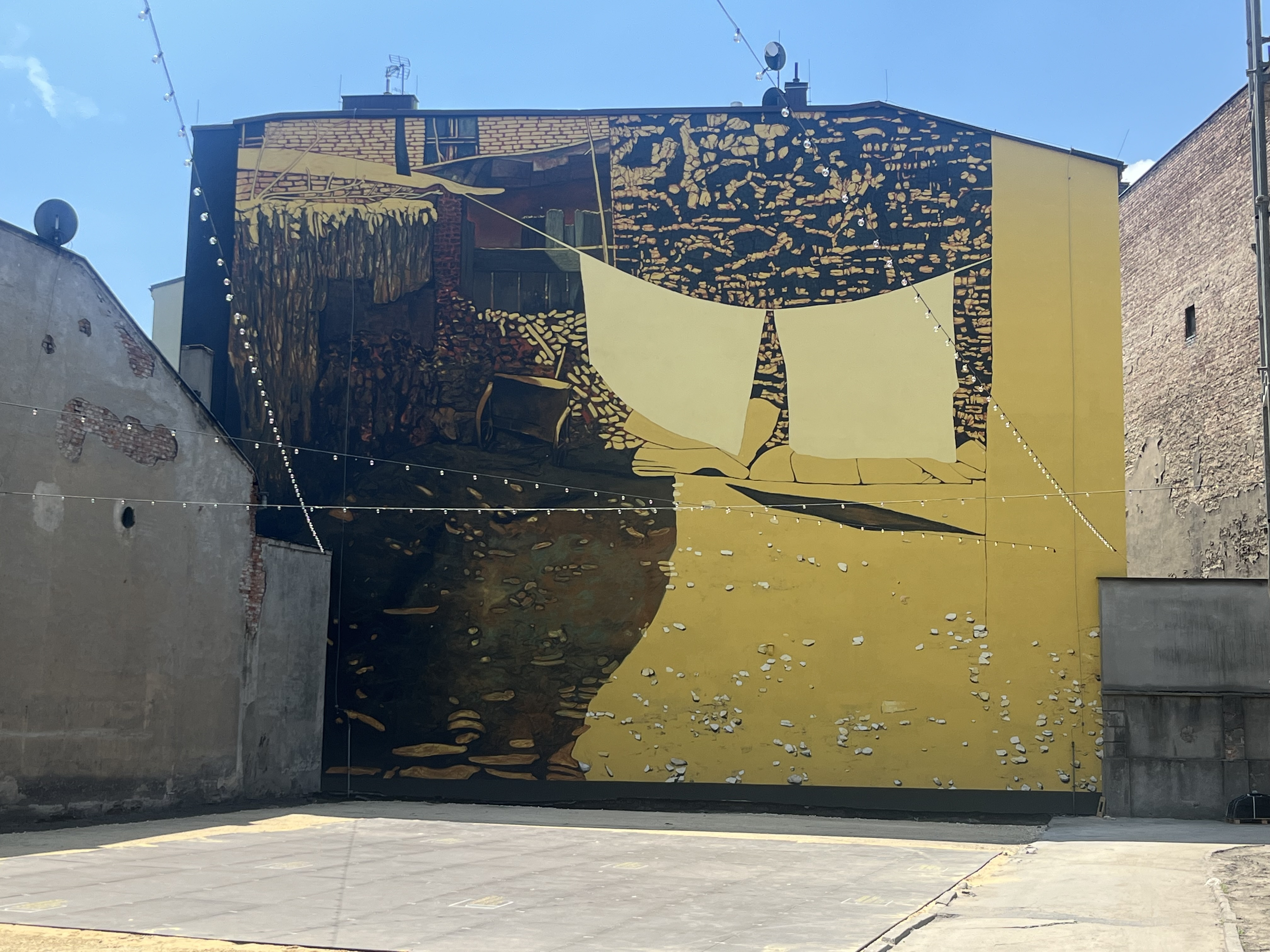
Mural at the Sosnowiec Art Courtyard, in the courtyard of Bank Sztuki at 7 Małachowskiego Street

Rykała's work has also entered the public space of Sosnowiec through mural projects. In 2015, on the façade of a tenement house at 11 3 Maja Street in Sosnowiec, from the side of Warszawska Street, the mural Sosnowieckie podwórko z żółtą Warszawą was created; the design was by Jacek Rykała, and Aleksander Kozera and Miłosz Wnukowski worked on the execution. In 2026, at Małachowskiego Street in the Sosnowiec Art Courtyard, a monumental mural inspired by the painting Elisabeth Balut was being prepared; the project was designed by Jacek Rykała, and Aleksander Kozera and Miłosz Wnukowski were involved in its execution. In 2025, at the Museum in Sosnowiec, as part of the Ars Cameralis Festival, the installation Wyjście | Wejście was presented; it included the painting Ayer. His mural projects in Sosnowiec develop motifs present in his paintings, including the urban courtyard, façade, window, gate and traces of former residents, transferring them from paintings and painted objects into public space.

Eight television materials have been made about Rykała's work, including programmes for TVP Warszawa, TVP Kraków, TVP Katowice and Canal+.

== Honours ==
- Gold Cross of Merit
- Gold Medal for Merit to Culture – Gloria Artis (2020)
- Silver Medal for Merit to Culture – Gloria Artis (2011)

== Awards ==
- Medals at the National Painting Exhibition Bielska Jesień in Bielsko-Biała (1978, 1980)
- First prize in the Z. R. Pomorski National Painting Competition in Katowice (1980)
- Awards in the J. Spychalski Painting Competition in Poznań (1980, 1986)
- Awards at the 10th and 15th Festival of Polish Painting in Szczecin (1980, 1988)
- Award at the exhibition Polska. Krajobraz, ludzie, idee at BWA in Sopot (1981)
- Distinction at the Internationale Kunstbiennale "Seetal" in Switzerland (1985)
- Sosnowiec City Award for artistic activity for 1992 (1992)
- Annual Artistic Award of the Marshal of the Silesian Voivodeship (2011)
