= Zywicki =

Zywicki is a surname, originally Żywicki in Polish. Notable people with the surname include:

- Jeff Zywicki (born 1981), Canadian lacrosse player
- Todd Zywicki (born 1966), American lawyer, legal scholar, and educator
- Tammy Zywicki (1971–1992), American murder victim, sister of Todd Zywicki

== See also ==
- Żywiecki (surname)
