= Mass murder on Dzika Street =

Coordinates: 52.2535°N 20.9835°E

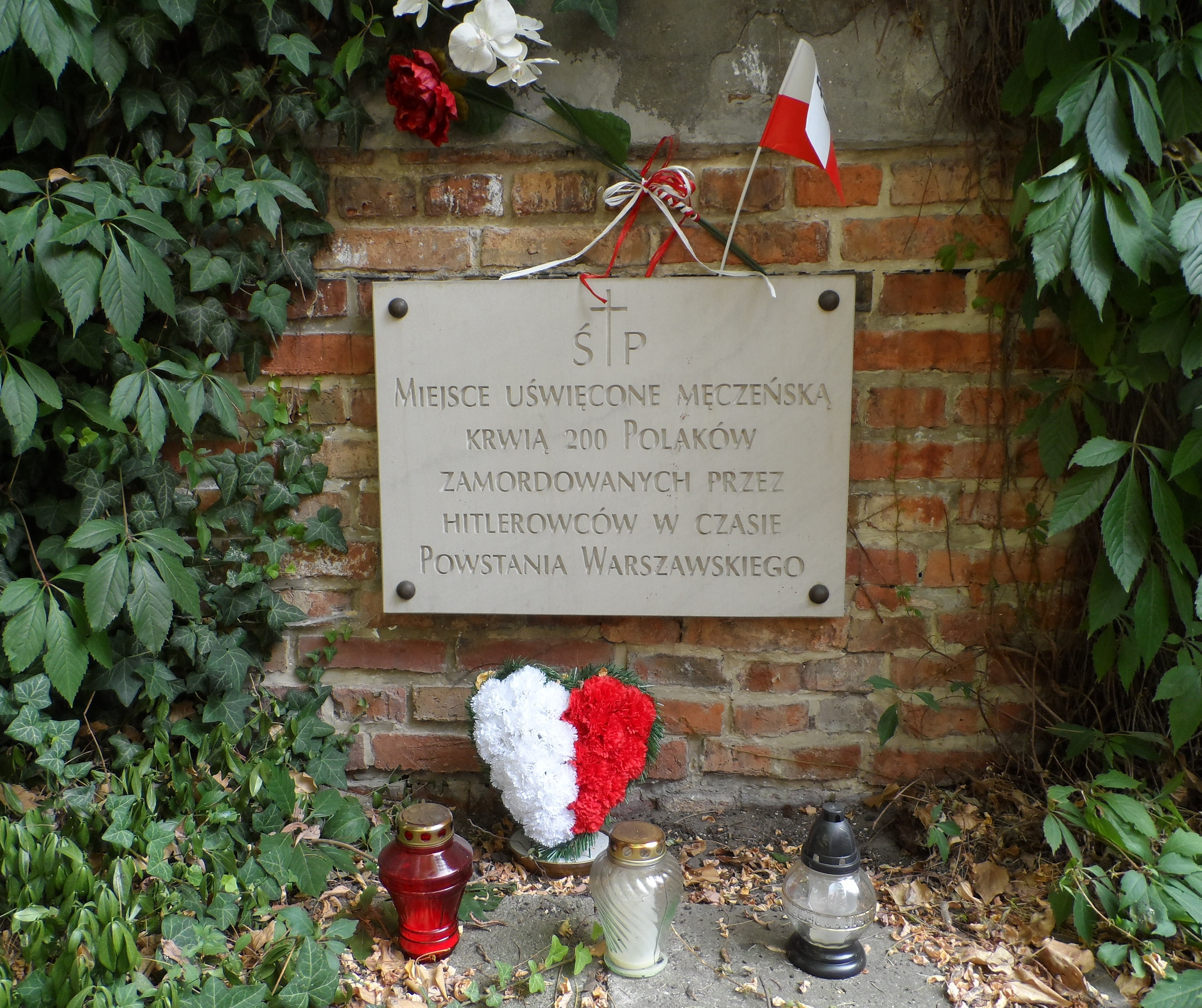
Plaque at the courtyard of the tenement house at 17 Dzika Street, commemorating victims of the massacre

The mass murder on Dzika street was a war crime committed by German troops against Polish civilians during World War II, amidst the Warsaw Uprising on August 21, 1944. The execution took place in the yard of a housing block on Dzika 17 street. Around 200 civilians were killed. While nowhere near as large as the wholesale massacre in Wola, it was one of the largest mass murder carried out by the Nazis during the battle of Warsaw Old Town.

== Background ==
On August 20, the Polish insurgents repulsed a German attack on the Muranów neighborhood. The insurgents took heavy casualties, were looking at the increasingly indefensible positions, and were pressured by some civilians to stop the hostilities. On the morning of August 21, 1944, soldiers of the Polish Home Army, under command of Franciszek Rataj, left the neighborhood. This area was immediately seized by the advancing German troops.

== Crime ==
Civilians who did not escape along with the soldiers of Home Army were captured. First, German soldiers separated the men from women and children. Then around 500 men were flocked to a warehouse on Stawki street. In the warehouse soldiers conducted a "selection" from the crowd all men who possessed elements of a military uniform (shoes, pants, caps, etc.), as well as items that may have come from German military warehouses (e.g. canned goods). They also brought elderly people from a nearby retirement home at Przebieg street as well as several women. Afterward, a group of around 200 "selected" men were taken to the yard of a housing block on Dzika 17 street and shot. Their corpses were burned. It was only until after the war that their fate (and their mass grave) were discovered.
