= Polish Radio Katowice =

Radio station in Silesia

Coordinates: 50°15′11″N 19°01′17″E

Polish Radio Katowice Polskie Radio Katowice

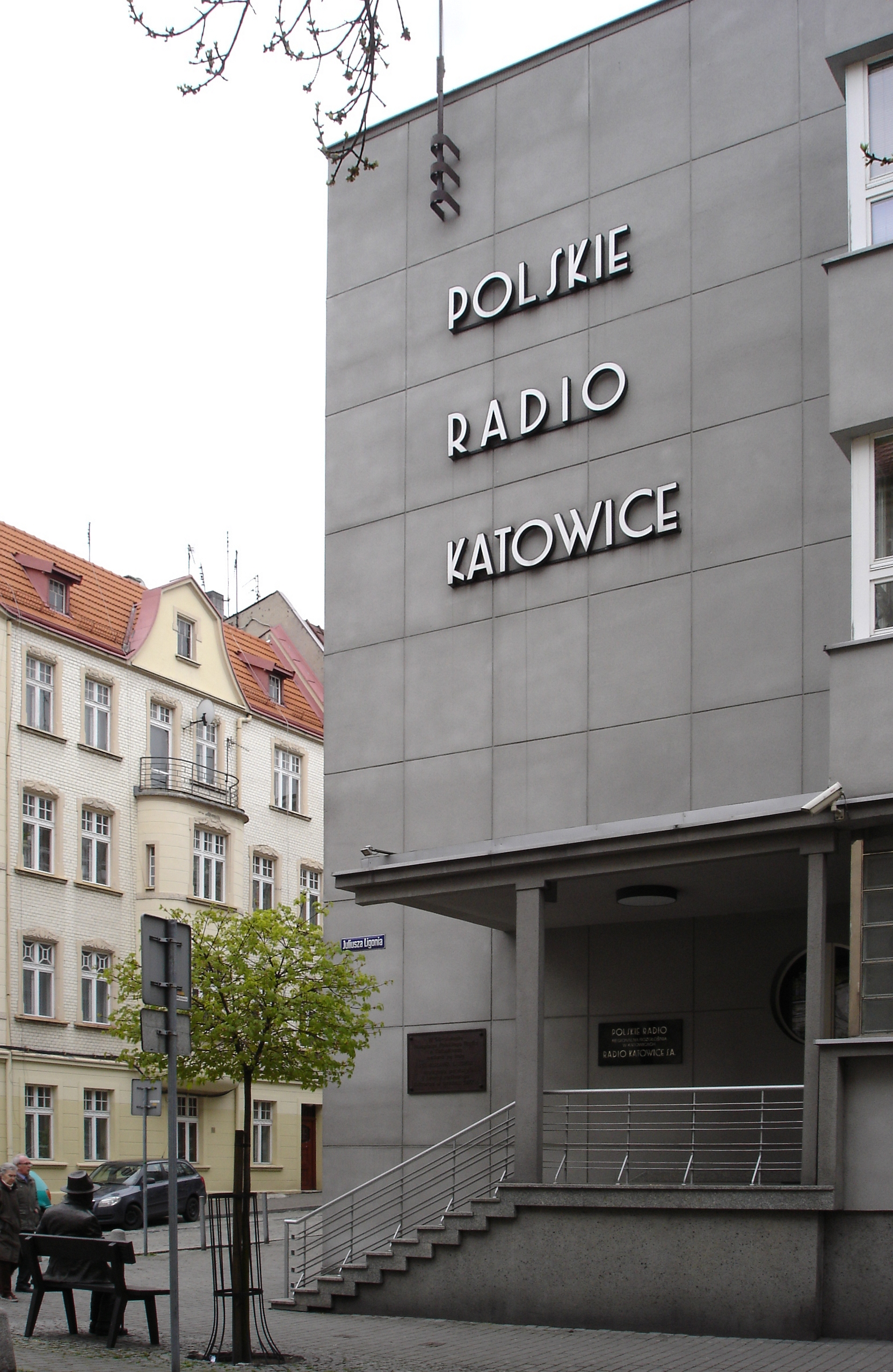
- The station's headquarters
- Katowice; Poland
- Broadcast area: Silesia
- Branding: Radio Katowice

Programming
- Language: Polish
- Format: Regional, News, Music, Easy listening

Ownership
- Owner: Polskie Radio
- Sister stations: Regional Polish Radio

History
- First air date: 1927

Links
- Webcast: radio.katowice.pl/player
- Website: radio.katowice.pl

Polish Radio Katowice (Polish: Polskie Radio Katowice) is the largest regional station of Polish Radio. It was created in 1927. It can be received in the Silesian Voivodeship and bordering entities.
