= Stanisław Małachowski Street =

Street in Sosnowiec, Poland

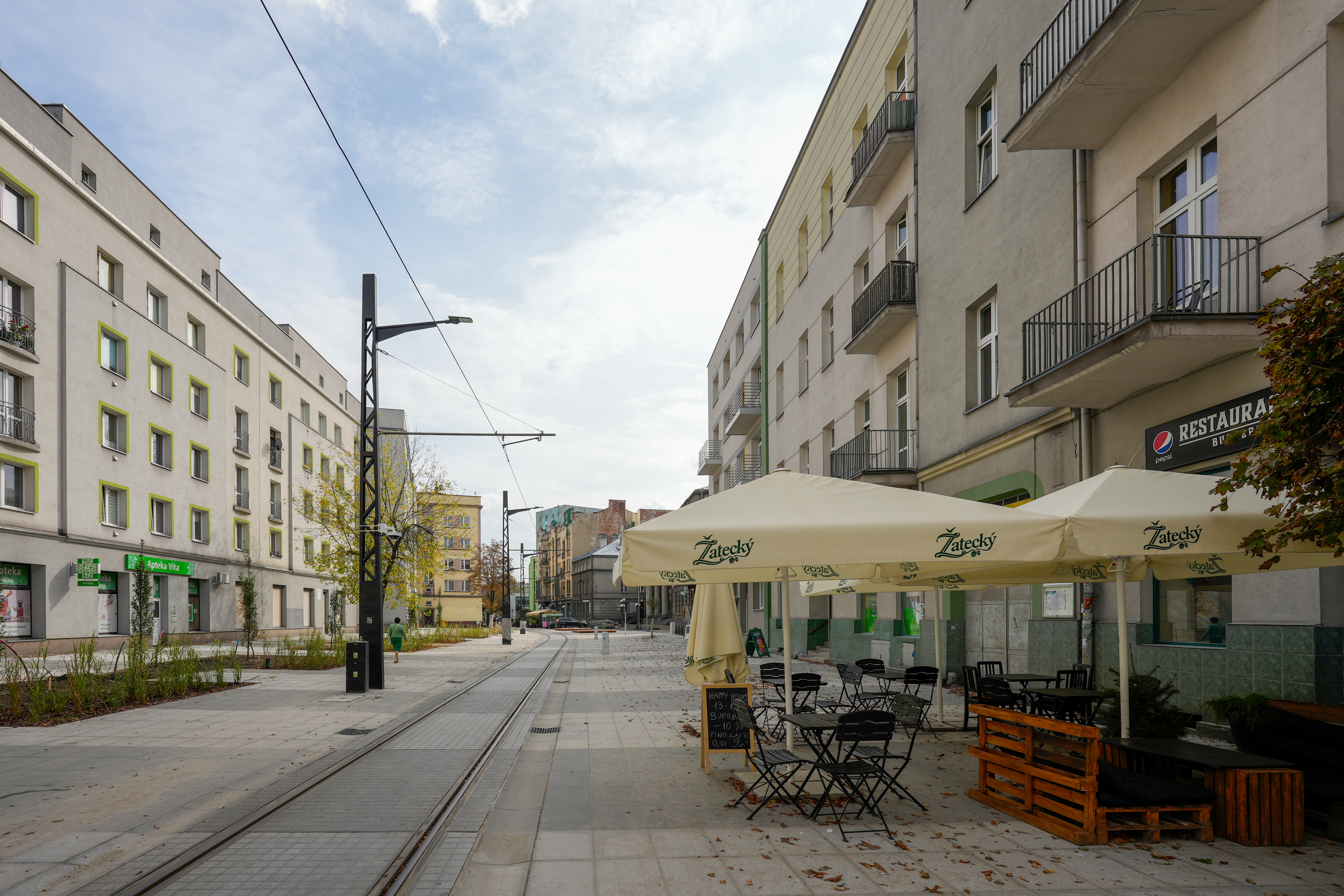
- Małachowskiego Street near the junction with Targowa Street
- Interactive map of Stanisław Małachowski Street
- Native name: Ulica Stanisława Małachowskiego (Polish)
- Former name: Fabryczna Street
- Namesake: Stanisław Małachowski
- Length: 0.76 km (0.47 mi)
- Location: Sosnowiec, Silesian Voivodeship, Poland
- Quarter: Śródmieście
- west end: Zagłębie Dąbrowskie Roundabout
- Major junctions: Chłodna Street; Modrzejowska Street; Żurawia Street; Władysława Warneńczyka Street; Ignacy Mościcki Street; Kościelna Street; Targowa Street
- east end: 3 Maja Street

Stanisław Małachowski Street (Polish: ulica Stanisława Małachowskiego) is a street in the Śródmieście district of Sosnowiec, Silesian Voivodeship, Poland. It is approximately 0.76 km long and runs from the Zagłębie Dąbrowskie Roundabout, at the junction with Ostrogórska, 1 Maja and Henryk Sienkiewicz streets, to 3 Maja Street. Along its course it intersects Chłodna, Modrzejowska, Żurawia, Władysław Warneńczyk, Ignacy Mościcki, Kościelna and Targowa streets.

== History ==
Before the First World War, the street was known as Fabryczna Street (ulica Fabryczna). In 1916, during the commemorations of the 125th anniversary of the Constitution of 3 May 1791, it was renamed Małachowskiego Street. From the beginning it covered the road section from 3 Maja Street, then known as Główna Street, to the bridge over the Czarna Przemsza, where it connected with Schönowska Street, now 1 Maja Street.

Located close to the railway station, the street was developed with multi-storey tenement houses, often with decorated façades and outbuildings. It became one of the commercial streets of central Sosnowiec and was inhabited to a significant extent by the Jewish population of the town. In the 1920s, as part of an urban development programme prepared by Professor Jan Rakowicz, two bank buildings were erected or expanded on the street: the Bank Polski building and the building of Bank Handlowy w Warszawie.

The Bank Polski building, later used during the Second World War as the Reichsbank and after the war by Bank Śląski and ING Bank Śląski, was designed by Marian Lalewicz and refers to academic classical architecture. The Bank Handlowy building consists of a lower part dating from 1908 and an additional eclectic building containing the bank's operating hall.

Part of the older development of the street was demolished in the 1970s. A tram line was also laid along the street during this period. The area around both former bank buildings has remained largely unchanged since the 1930s. Among the surviving tenement houses, the buildings at Małachowskiego 9 and Małachowskiego 32 are distinguished by Art Nouveau ornamentation.

In 2015, at the initiative of Sosnowiec urban activist Rafał Siciński, an urban revival campaign called "Wpadaj na Małacha" began. In the same year one of the three small squares along the street was also revitalised.

In 2021, a major redevelopment of the street began on the 400-metre section between the junction with Kościelna and Ignacy Mościcki streets and 3 Maja Street. In the first stage, Silesia Invest of Gliwice, working for Tramwaje Śląskie, replaced the tram track and the traction power infrastructure. Later work included the replacement of the street surface and changes in traffic organisation, turning the restaurant-oriented part of the street into a pedestrian area.

== Historic buildings ==
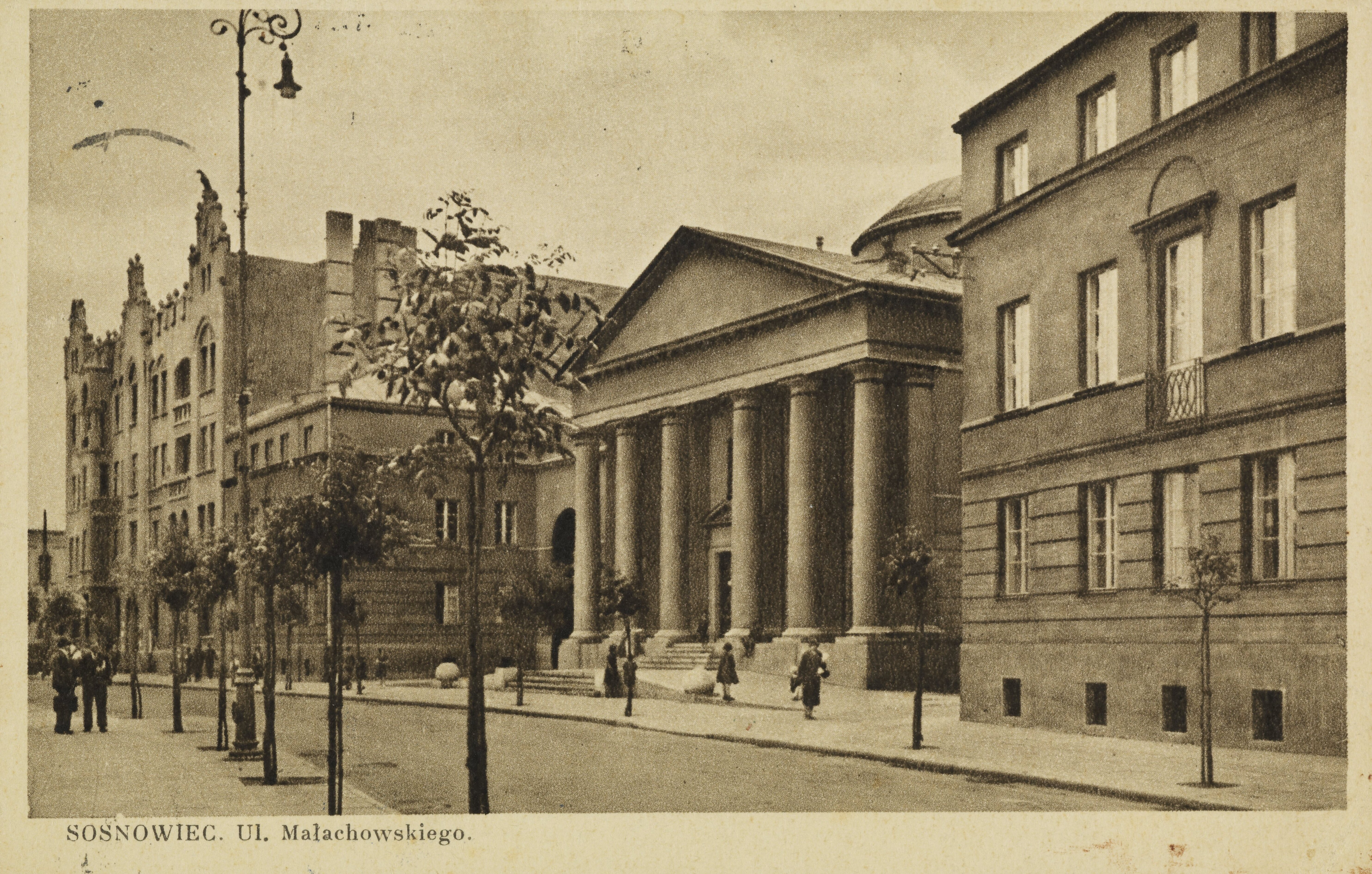
Stanisław Małachowski Street between 1930 and 1935

The street contains buildings entered in the register of monuments and tenement houses included in the municipal heritage register of Sosnowiec.

- The former Bank Handlowy building at Małachowskiego 3 was erected in 1908 as a bank building and extended in 1923 with an operating hall. The complex consists of two parts connected by a link building; the older part is attributed to the architect Kugor, while the extension was designed by Bolesław Żurkowski. The building has Neo-Renaissance forms and was entered in the register of monuments under number A/1609/95 on 15 September 1995.
- The residential tenement house at Małachowskiego 4 is included in the municipal heritage register of Sosnowiec. It belongs to the compact inner-city development on the even-numbered side of the street and is dated by Fotopolska as a building erected before 1939.
- The residential and service tenement house at Małachowskiego 5 is included in the municipal heritage register. The building was erected in 1907. From 1910 it housed the seven-grade Commercial School of Józefa Siwikowa, which had previously operated at Modrzejowska 22 and was later transformed into the Girls' Gymnasium of the Polish Educational Society and subsequently into the State Gymnasium named after Emilia Plater. In 1934 the school moved to a new building on Parkowa 1.
- The former Bank Polski complex at Małachowskiego 7 consists of a monumental bank building and two residential buildings connected to it by passage gates. The main building was erected between 1922 and 1924 to a design by Marian Lalewicz as a branch of Bank Polski. The complex was entered in the register of monuments under number A/1529/93 on 30 April 1993. The building currently houses Bank Sztuki, a cultural and events venue.
- The residential tenement house at Małachowskiego 8 is included in the municipal heritage register. Fotopolska dates the building to before 1939; its photographic documentation includes an outbuilding and original doors from the courtyard side.
- The tenement house at Małachowskiego 9 is included in the municipal heritage register. It is an Art Nouveau tenement house with outbuildings and a rich record of former occupants: in the interwar period it housed medical practices, legal offices, a branch of the Polish Merchants' Association and other commercial and institutional offices. The building has been documented in photographs at least since 1931 and today houses, among other uses, a hostel and catering and service premises.
- The residential tenement house at Małachowskiego 10 is included in the municipal heritage register. It stands at the junction with Targowa Street and is dated by Fotopolska as having been erected before 1939; photographic documentation includes one of its outbuildings.
- The residential tenement house at Małachowskiego 26 is included in the municipal heritage register. Fotopolska dates the building to before 1939. In the 1930s the address Małachowskiego 26 appeared as the seat of the drilling company M. Łempicki S.A., advertising foundation works, artesian wells, foundation strengthening and underground works.
- The residential tenement house at Małachowskiego 32 is included in the municipal heritage register. It is one of the best known Art Nouveau tenement houses on the street; a local study on Wanda Telakowska identifies it as a design by Edmund Telakowski. It is also listed in an international database of Art Nouveau architecture as a house designed by Edmund Telakowski at Małachowskiego 32.
- The residential tenement house at Małachowskiego 34 is included in the municipal heritage register. It is a corner building at the junction of Małachowskiego and Mościckiego streets and is documented in photographs from both the street and courtyard sides.
- The residential tenement house at Małachowskiego 40 is included in the municipal heritage register. Photographic documentation shows the street façade, courtyard and outbuilding.
- The residential tenement house at Małachowskiego 42 is included in the municipal heritage register. It is located in the eastern part of the street, near Warneńczyka Street; photographic documentation includes its façade and courtyard.
- The modernist residential building at Małachowskiego 46 is included in the municipal heritage register. It has a dedicated Wikimedia Commons category, where it is categorised as an example of modernist architecture in Sosnowiec. In 2022 it was described in the local press as being put up for sale.
- The residential tenement house at Małachowskiego 48 is included in the municipal heritage register. In the local press it was described as a building dated by the city to the 19th century; a demolition project for the lower building at this address was also reported. Fotopolska documents the condition of the building between 2016 and 2025, including the remaining structures at Małachowskiego 48.
Selected historic buildings and tenement houses on Stanisław Małachowski Street

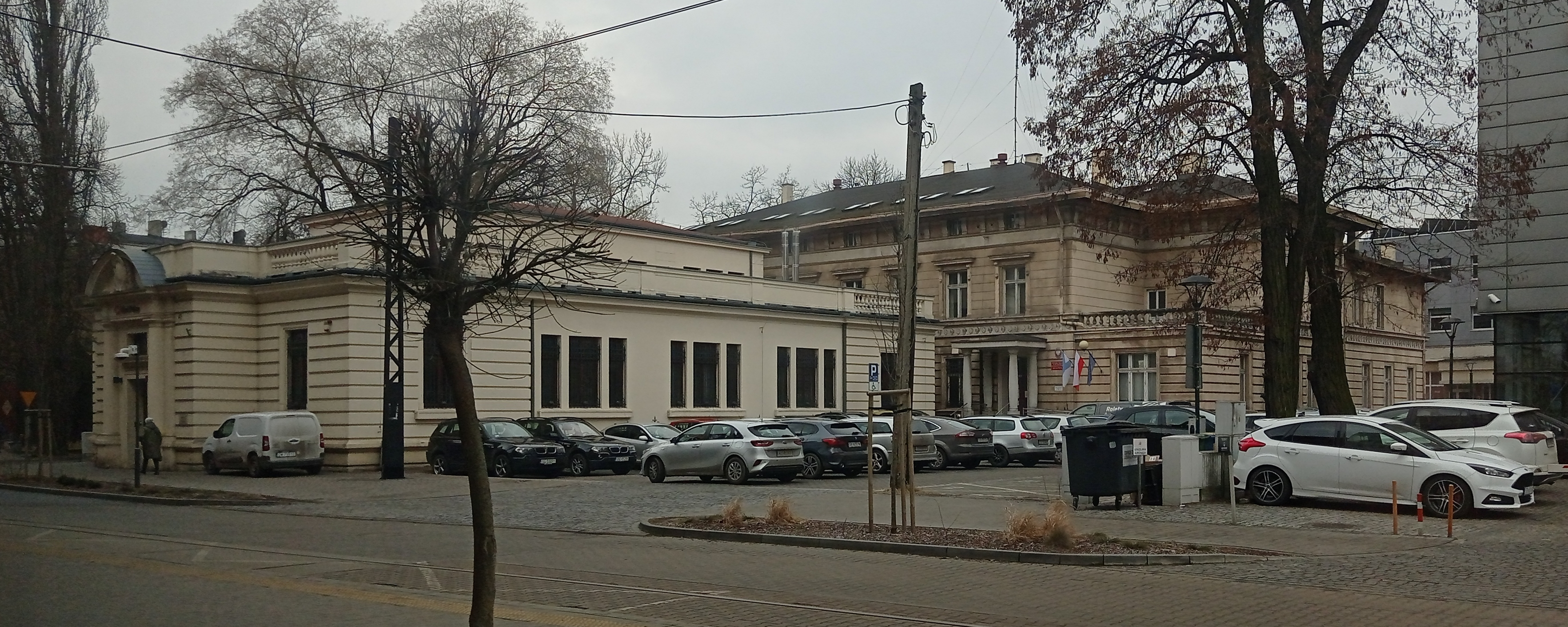
Former Bank Handlowy building at Małachowskiego 3

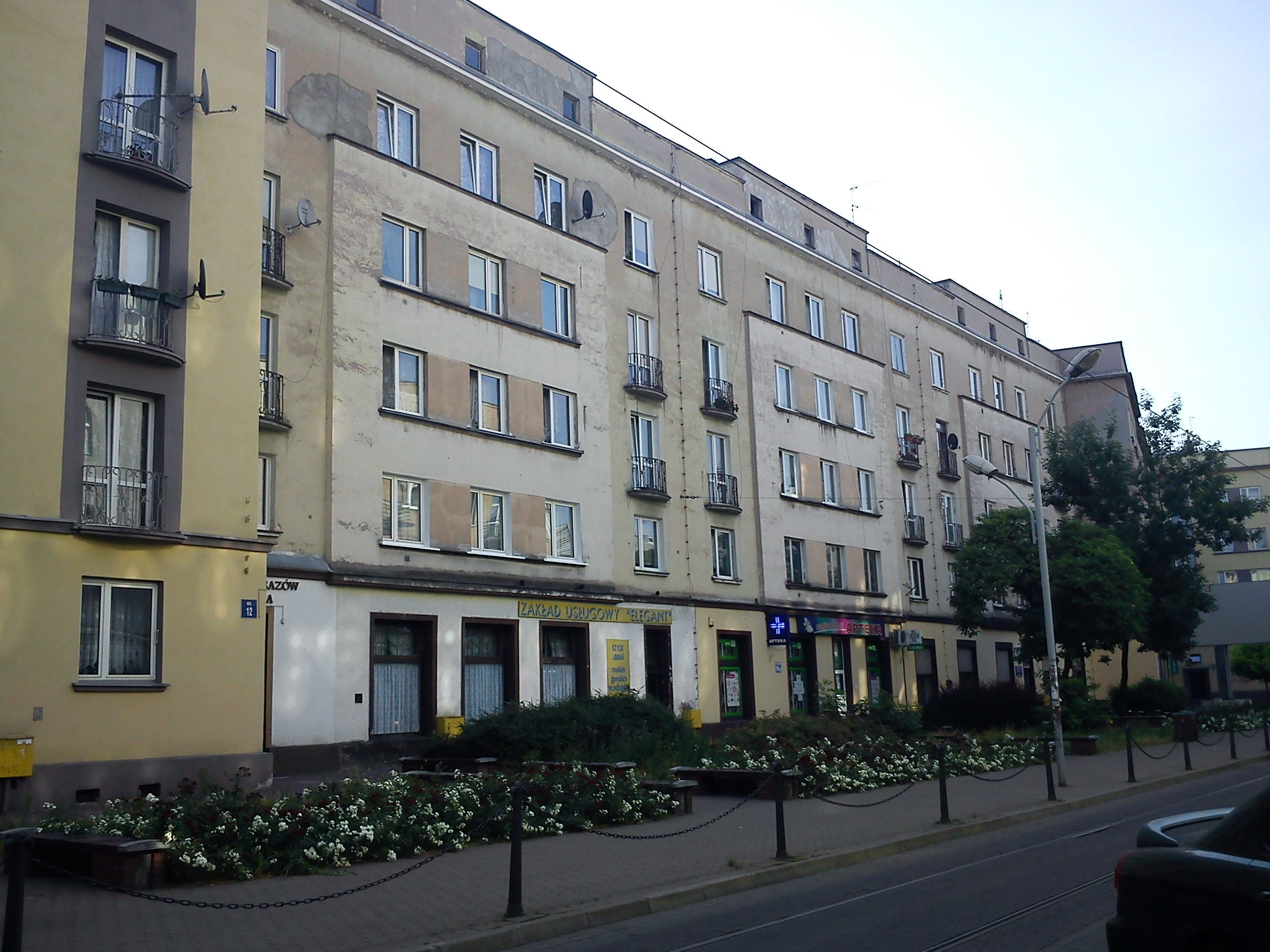
Street frontage near tenement houses nos. 5–9

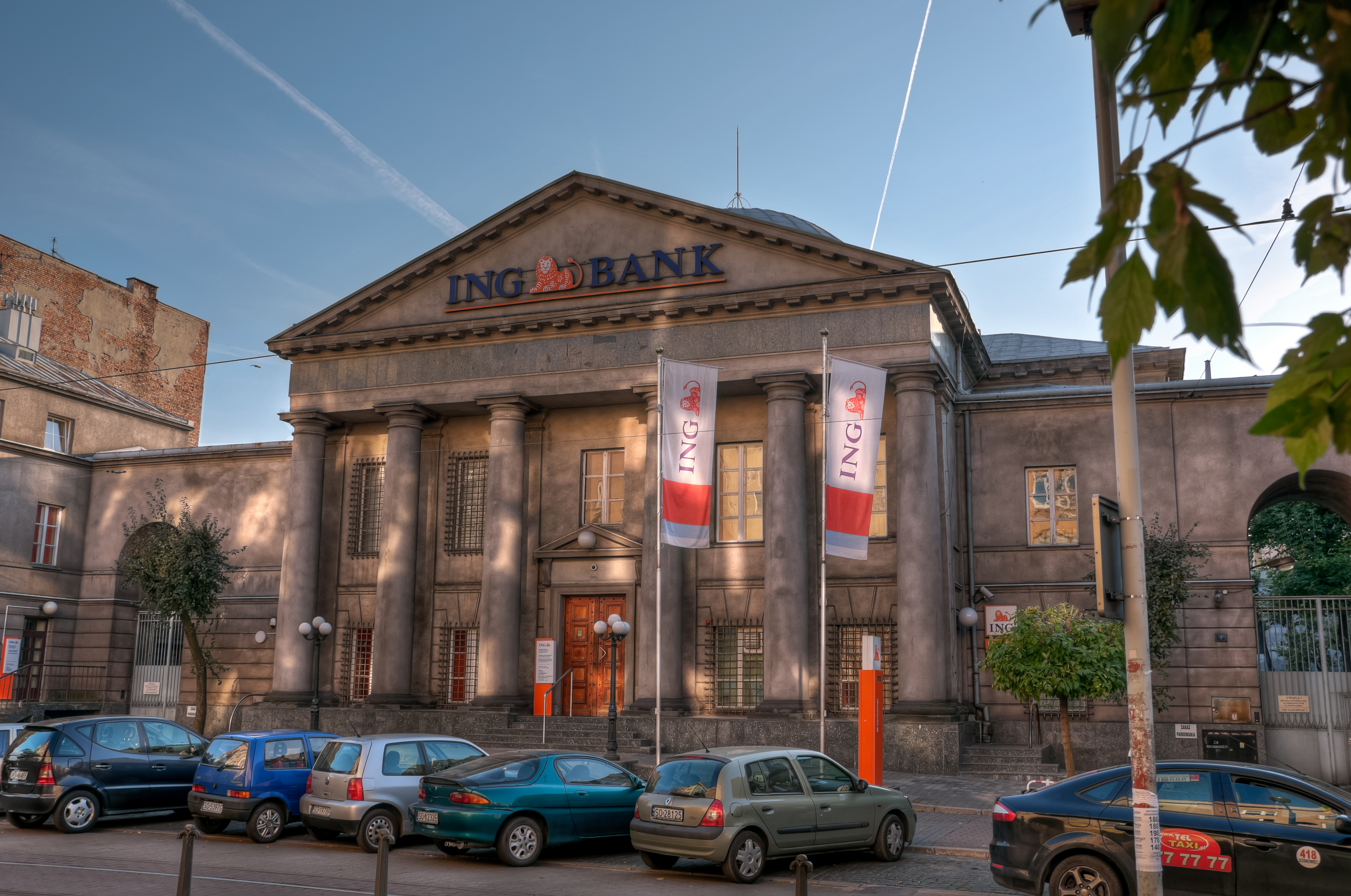
Former Bank Polski building at Małachowskiego 7

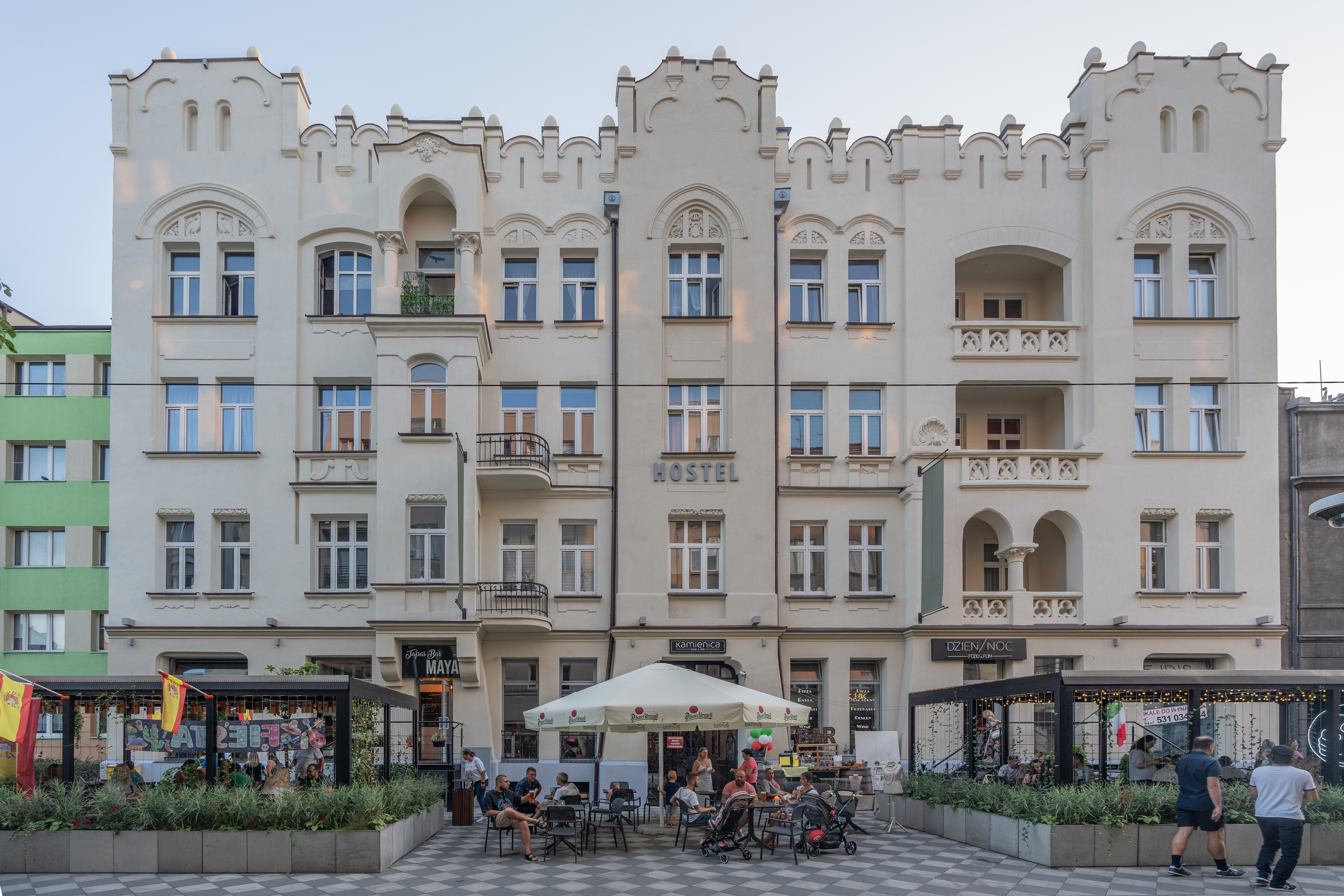
Tenement house at Małachowskiego 9

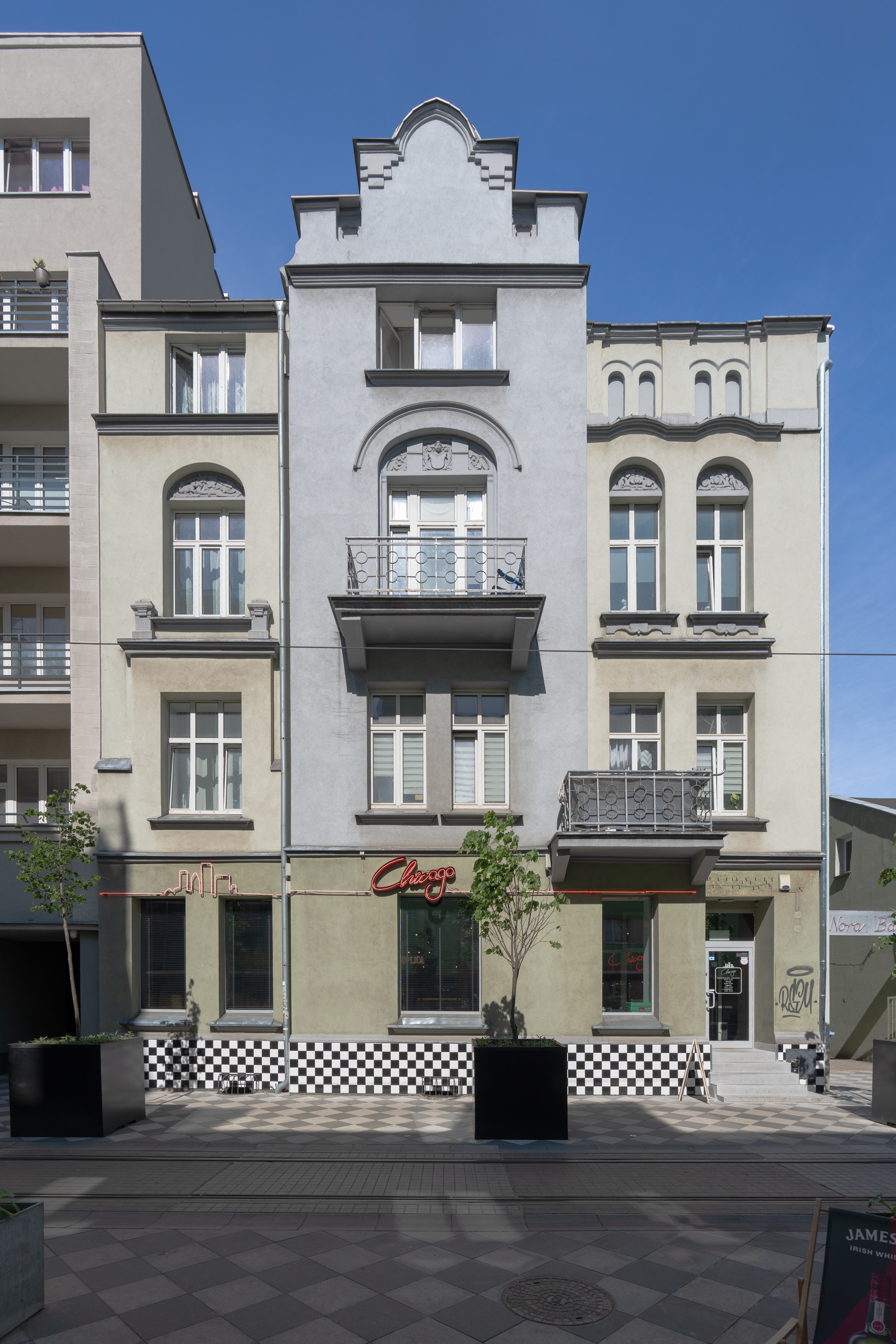
Tenement house at Małachowskiego 26

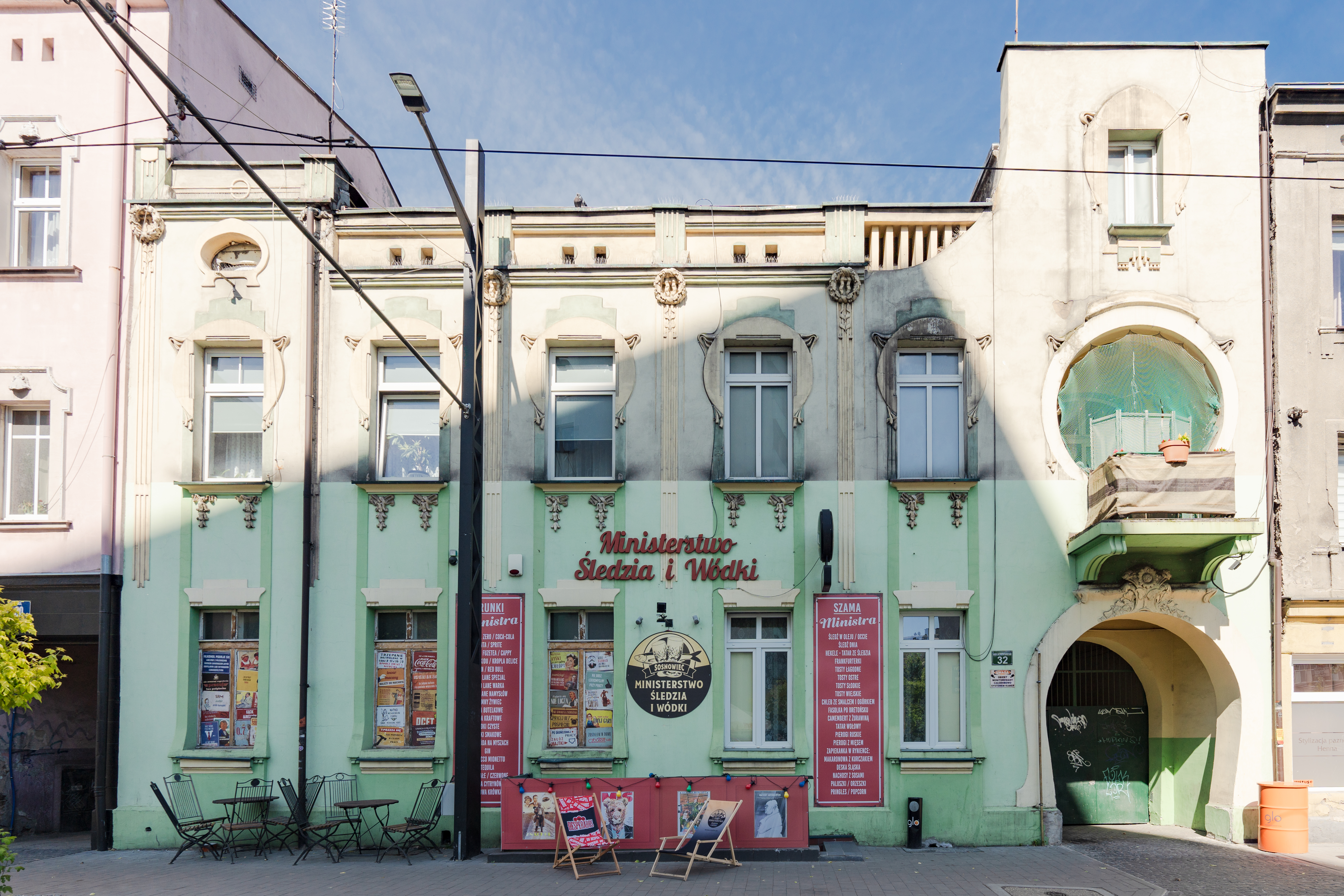
Art Nouveau tenement house at Małachowskiego 32

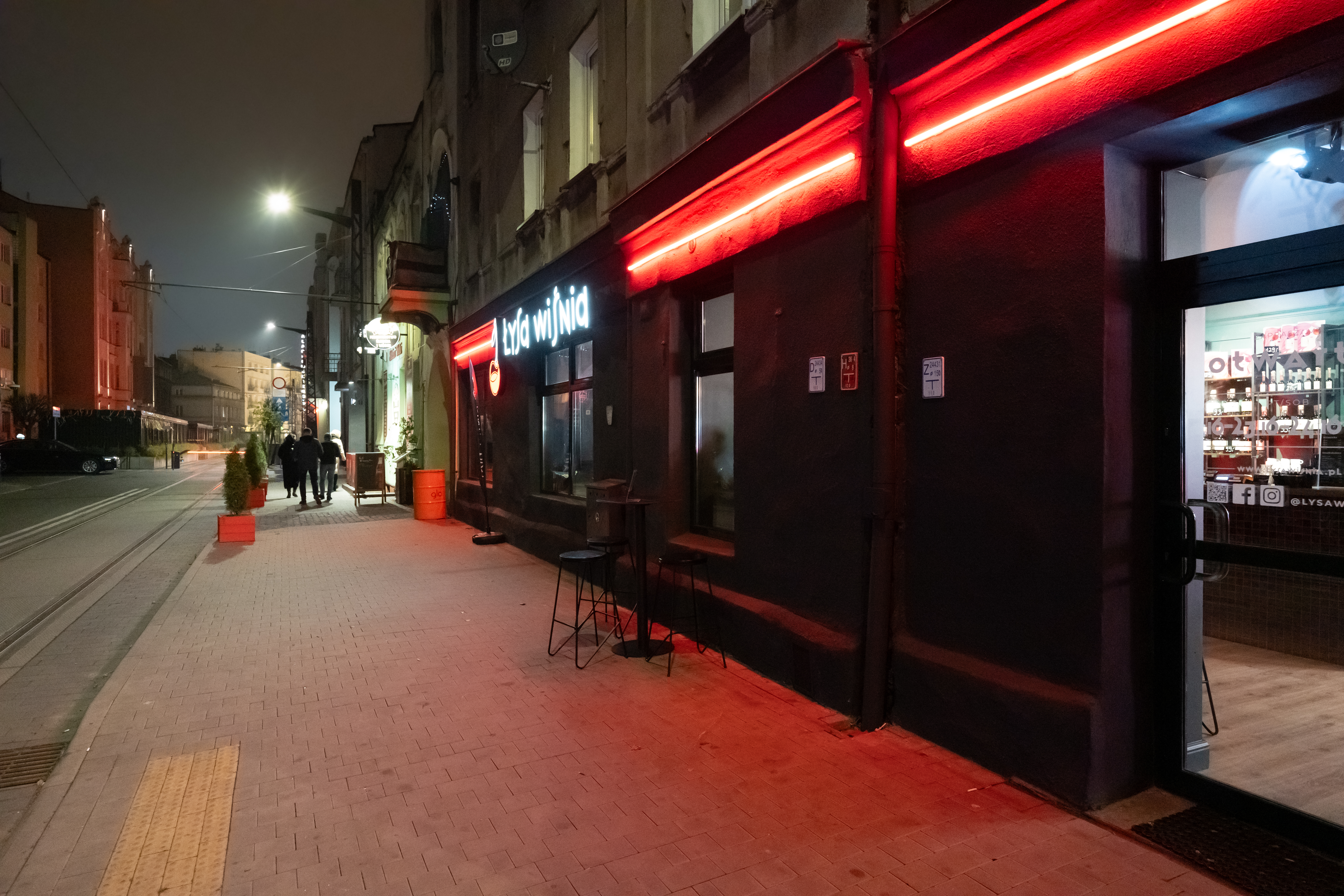
Tenement house at Małachowskiego 34

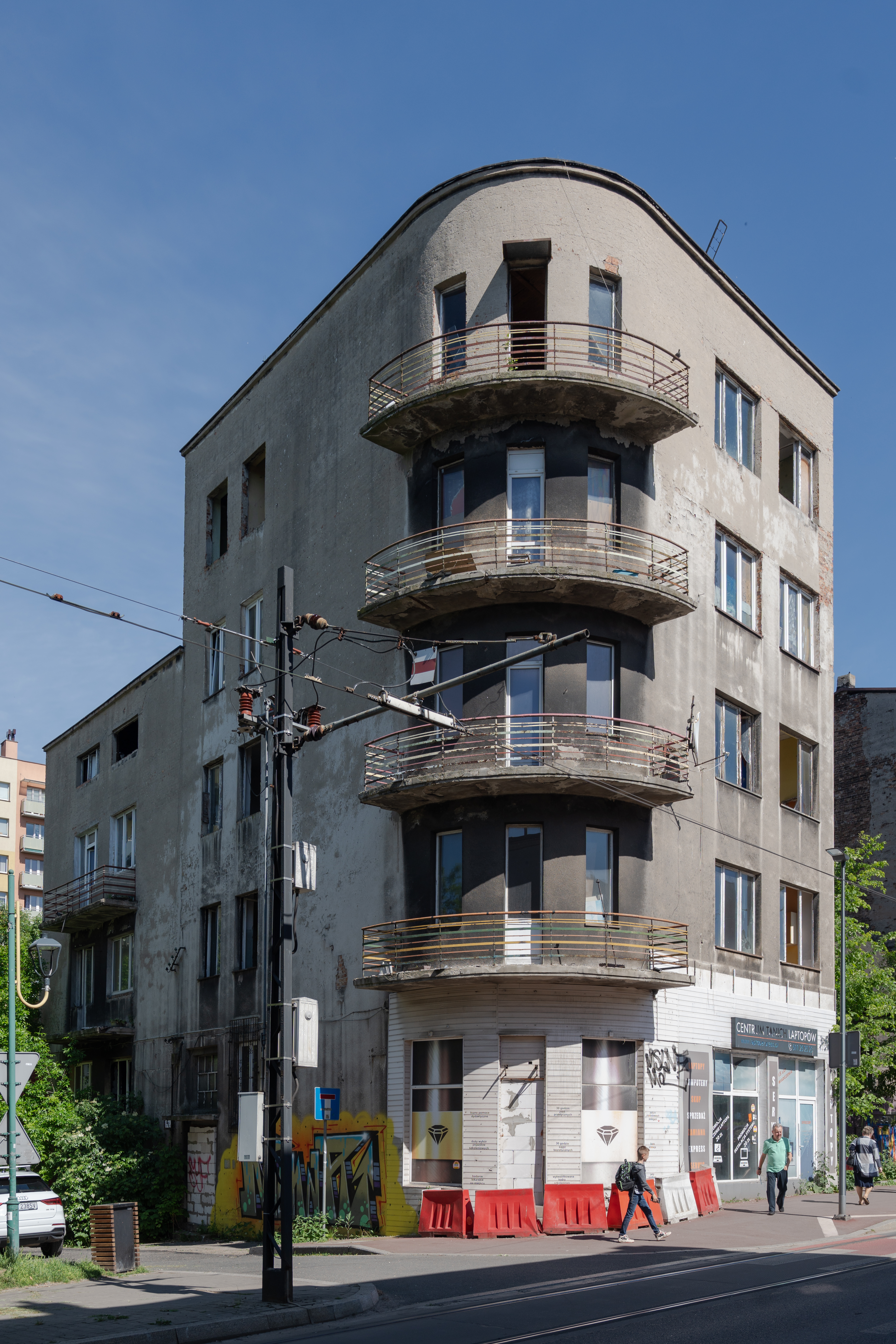
Modernist building at Małachowskiego 46

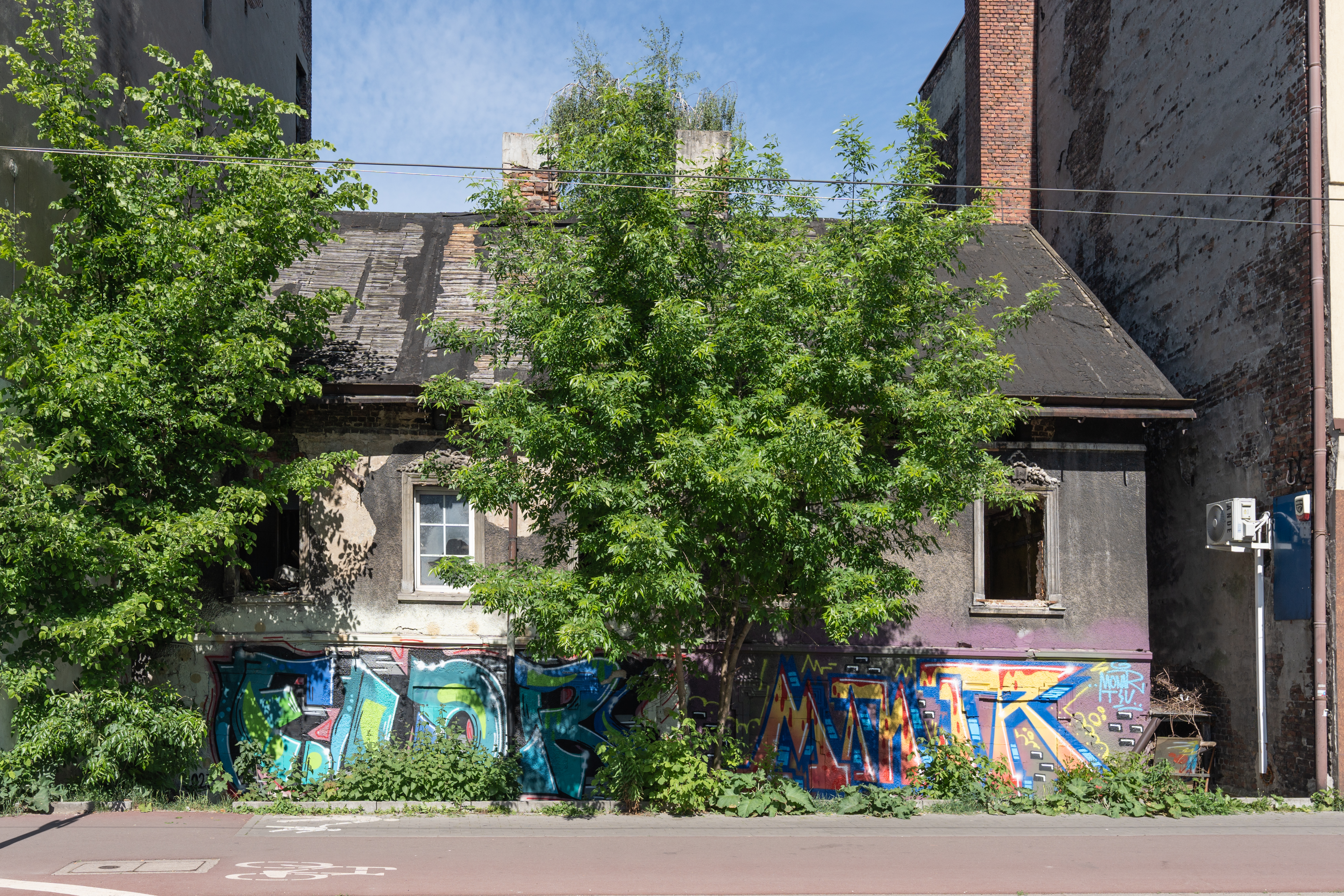
Tenement house at Małachowskiego 48

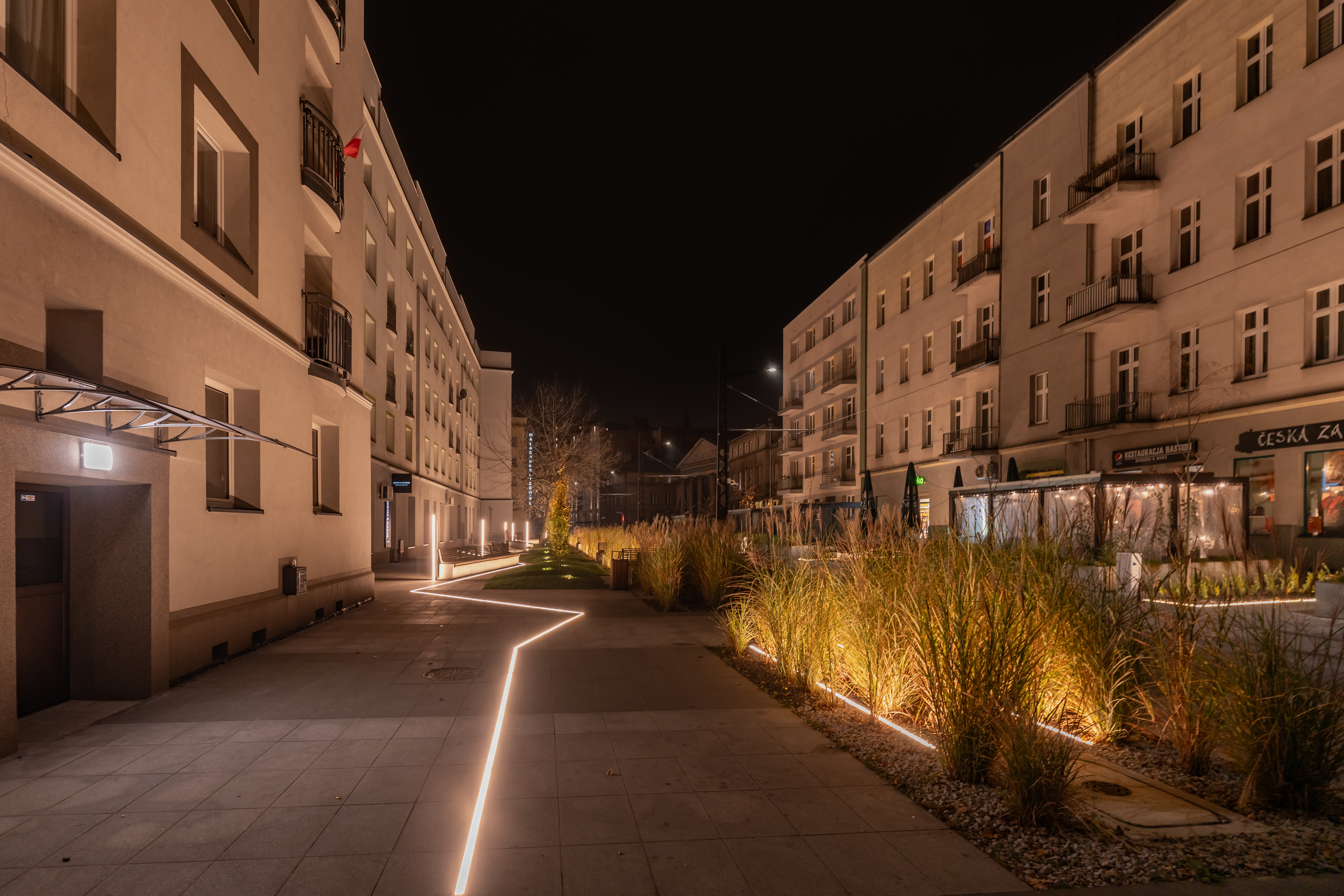
Tenement houses in the eastern part of Małachowskiego Street

== Other notable buildings ==
- The Helios cinema stands at the junction of Ignacy Mościcki, Kościelna and Małachowskiego streets. Its building incorporates the façade of the so-called "stone house" from 1860, which was demolished in 2002.
- The office building at Małachowskiego 1 formerly housed the Telecommunications Office and later Telekomunikacja Polska and Orange Polska.
- The Municipal Office of Sosnowiec has used space at Małachowskiego 3, including the Department of Development and Entrepreneurship and the Municipal Guard; until the end of November 2023 the building also housed the Department of Transport.
- Bank Sztuki is a cultural, artistic, educational and social events venue operating in the former bank building at Małachowskiego 7.

== Revitalisation and "Wpadaj na Małacha" ==
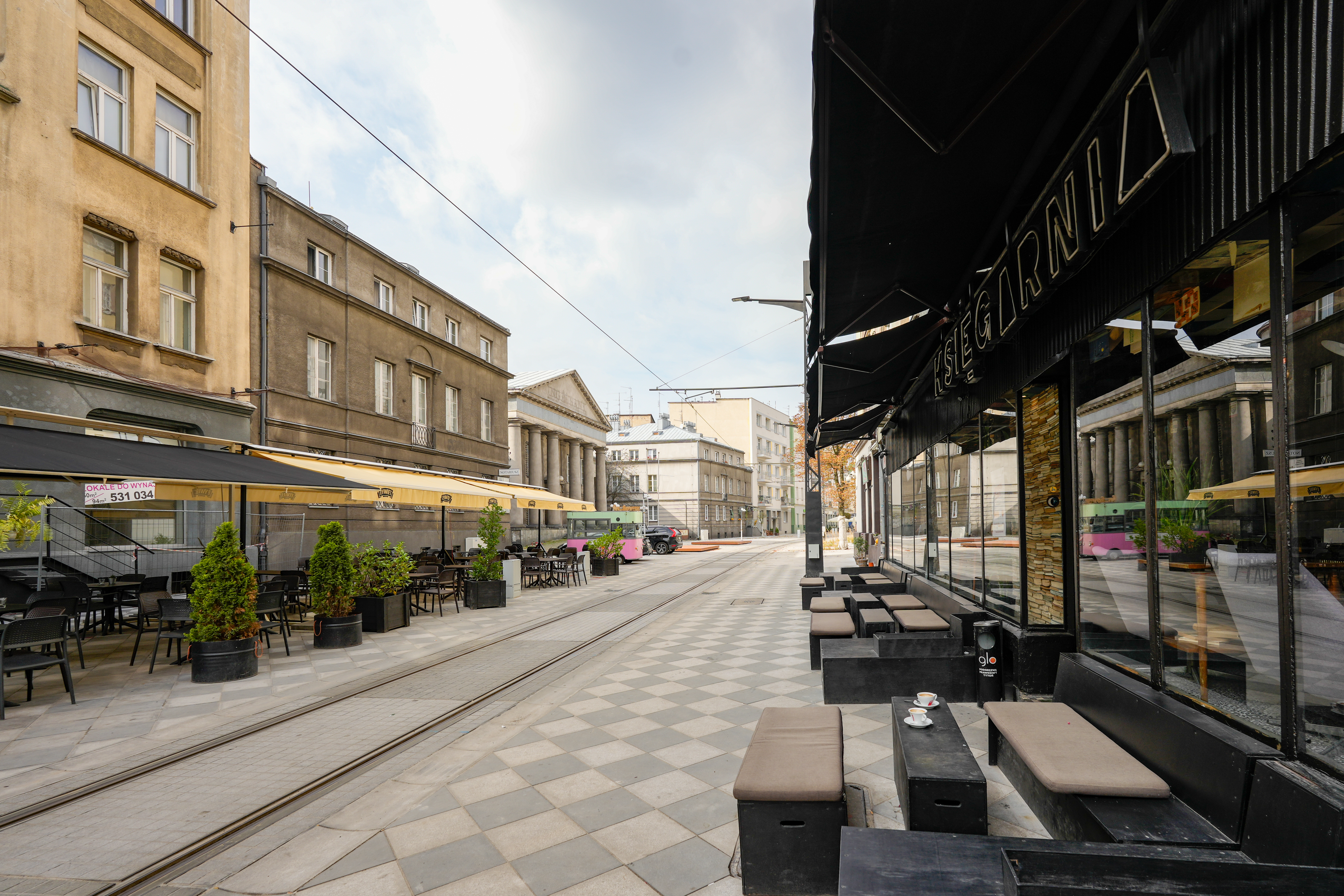
Restaurant gardens on Małachowskiego Street; Pub Księgarnia on the right

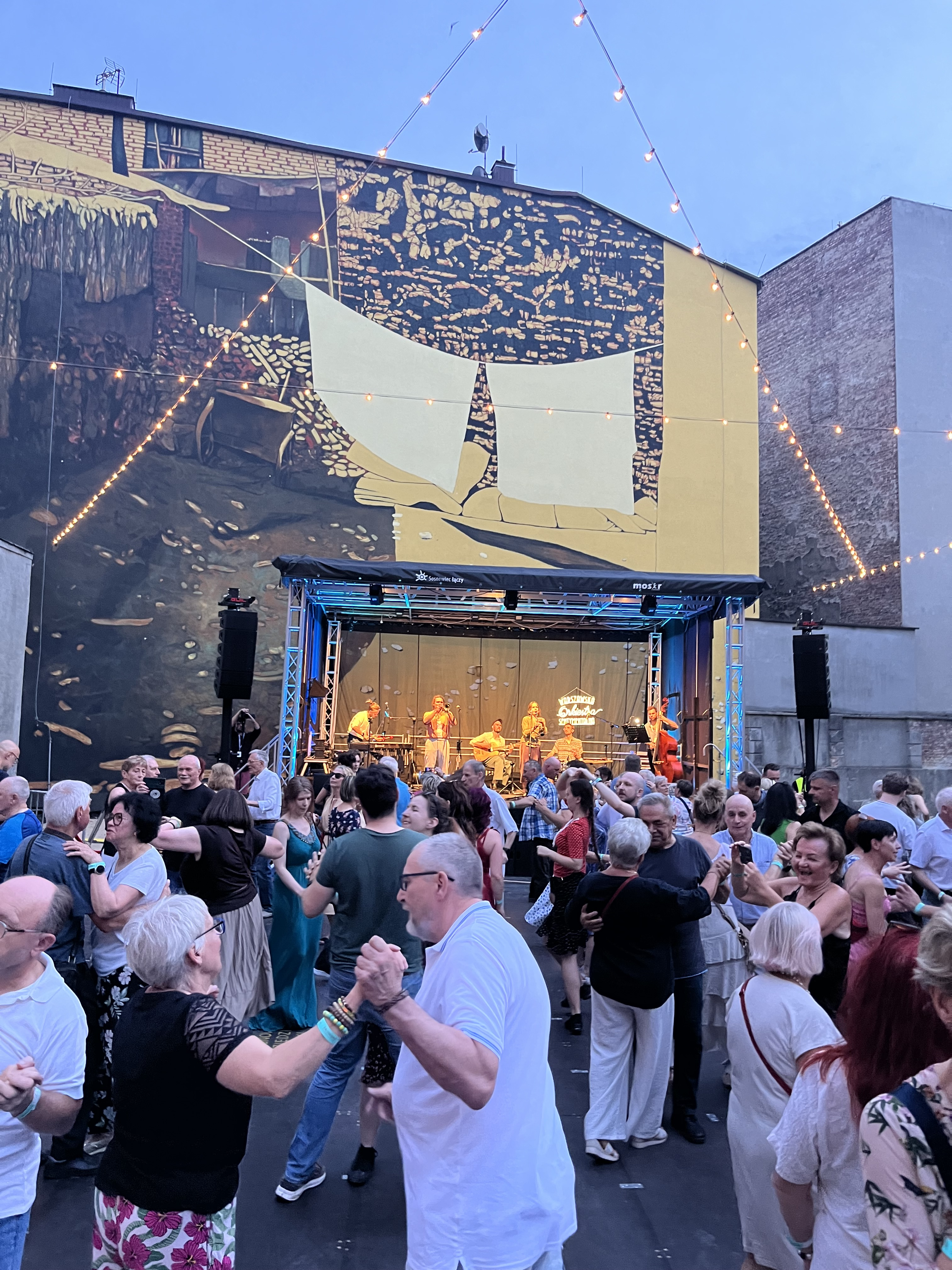
Dance event at Sosnowiecki Dziedziniec Sztuki, 2026

In 2015, the "Wpadaj na Małacha" initiative began in order to revive the centre of Sosnowiec. The plans included encouraging restaurateurs and owners of entertainment venues to open businesses on the street, creating summer outdoor seating areas, and rebuilding the street as a pedestrian zone. Since 2016, during the summer season, the street has been partially closed to traffic and parking spaces have been replaced by outdoor seating for restaurants and bars.

Numerous events and concerts have been organised as part of the initiative since 2015. These have included the "Birthday of Małachowski Street", "Sosnowiec Oktoberfest" and public reading events. The initiator of the campaign also sought to have the street rebuilt using participatory-budget funds.

In 2019 the reconstruction of the street was announced in connection with the renovation of the tram track, and work began on 1 February 2021. On 11 March 2024 Stanisław Małachowski Street officially became a pedestrian street, with barriers introduced to prevent car access to a substantial part of it.

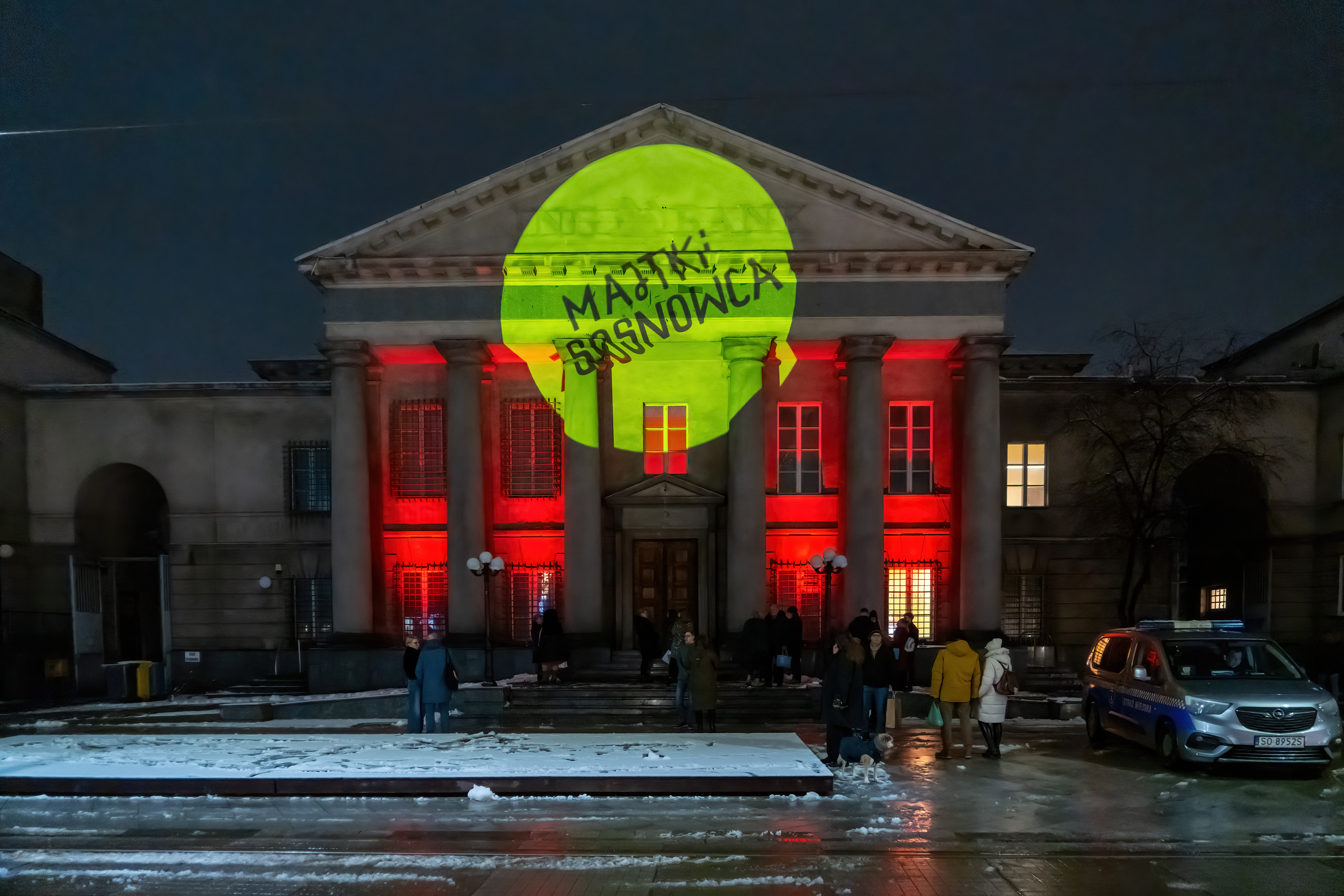
Fashion event at Bank Sztuki, Małachowskiego 7, 2024

After the street was turned into a pedestrian zone, its gastronomic and recreational function became more established. In 2026 local media described the opening of another summer season on Małachowskiego Street, noting new venues, outdoor seating, concerts, dance events and an art programme at Bank Sztuki. In May 2026, the local press also reported the return of a Czech beer garden on the pedestrian street and the operation of outdoor seating areas around Małachowskiego and 3 Maja streets.

In December 2024 the former bank building at Małachowskiego 7 gained a new function and name, Bank Sztuki, with the fashion show "Majtki z Sosnowca" serving as the inauguration of its new activity. Bank Sztuki is a space for cultural, artistic, educational and social events; in June 2025 it hosted the premiere of The Promised Land, a production by Teatr Zagłębia directed by Maja Kleczewska. In May 2026 Bank Sztuki was also the venue for a Museums' Night event in the preserved civil-defence shelter beneath the building.

In June 2026 the courtyard of Bank Sztuki at Małachowskiego 7 began to be developed and promoted as Sosnowiecki Dziedziniec Sztuki, complementing the building's cultural programme. The courtyard was used during ZA//GŁĘBIE, the Theatrical Festival of Local Stories, with screenings, a concert and a dance event featuring the Warsaw Sentimental Orchestra and Kapela Fedaków announced in the programme. One element of the developing space is planned as a mural gallery; in 2026 a mural based on a design by Jacek Rykała, inspired by the painting Elisabeth Balut, was being created on Małachowskiego Street.
