= Marian Lalewicz =

Polish architect

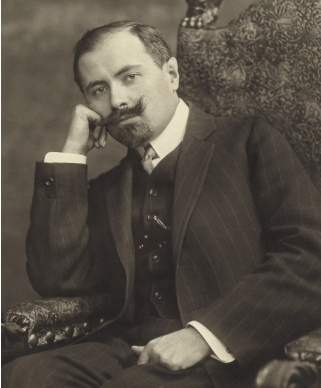
- Born: 21 November 1876; Wyłkowyszki, then the Russian Empire, today Lithuania
- Died: 21 August 1944 (aged 77); Warsaw, Poland
- Occupation: Architect

Marian Lalewicz (21 November 1876 – 21 August 1944) - was a Polish architect and one of the main proponents of Academic classicism in interwar Poland. He was a victim of the Nazi mass murder on Dzika Street during the Warsaw Uprising.

== Early life and studies ==
Lalewicz finished school at a gimnazjum in Suwałki in 1895. He then studied architecture at the Academy of Fine Arts in Saint-Petersburg, from which he graduated in 1901. He continued his studies in Sweden, Norway, Germany, Austria and Italy. Until 1917, he taught the history of art and the history of architecture in Saint Petersburg schools, while at the same time designing various buildings in Moscow and Saint Petersburg. After World War I he moved back to newly independent Poland. Between 1925 and 1927 he was the dean of the Architecture Department at the Warsaw Polytechnic, and between 1935 and 1938, he was a rector. He was active in various social organizations dedicated to the preservation of historic buildings.

== World War II ==
After the Nazi invasion of Poland, Lalewicz served as a director of the emergency medical services (Pogotwie Techniczne) during the Siege of Warsaw. Under German occupation he was a teacher at one of the secret universities (all education past primary school for Poles had been banned by the Nazis). He was expelled by the Germans from his home in 1943.

Lalewicz was executed during the Warsaw Uprising by German units, in the Mass murder on Dzika street on August 21, 1944. A symbolic grave was erected after the war at Warsaw's Powązki Cemetery (244-I-29).

== Major works ==
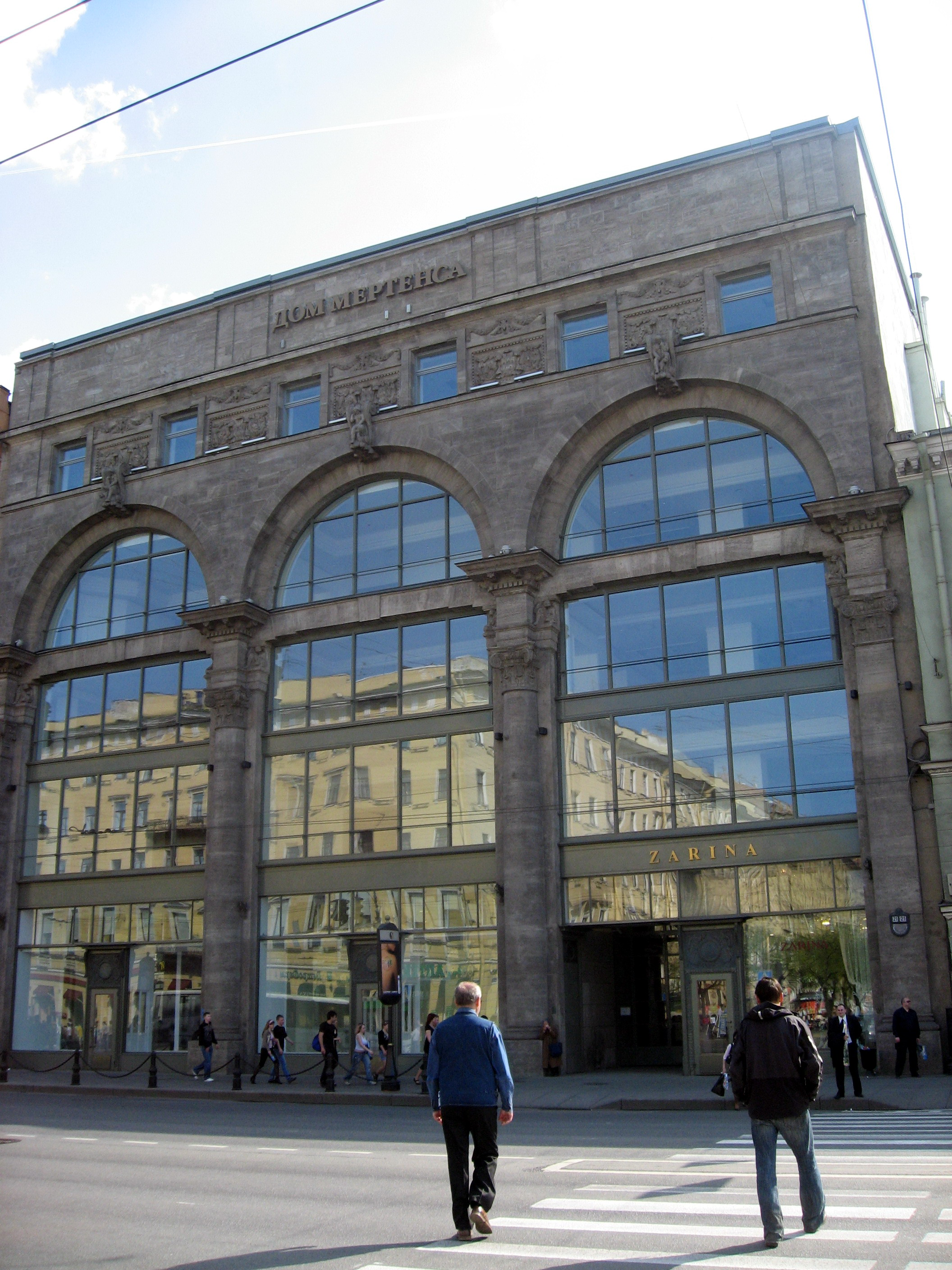
F.L. Martens department store building in Saint Petersburg, designed by Lalewicz.

=== In Poland ===
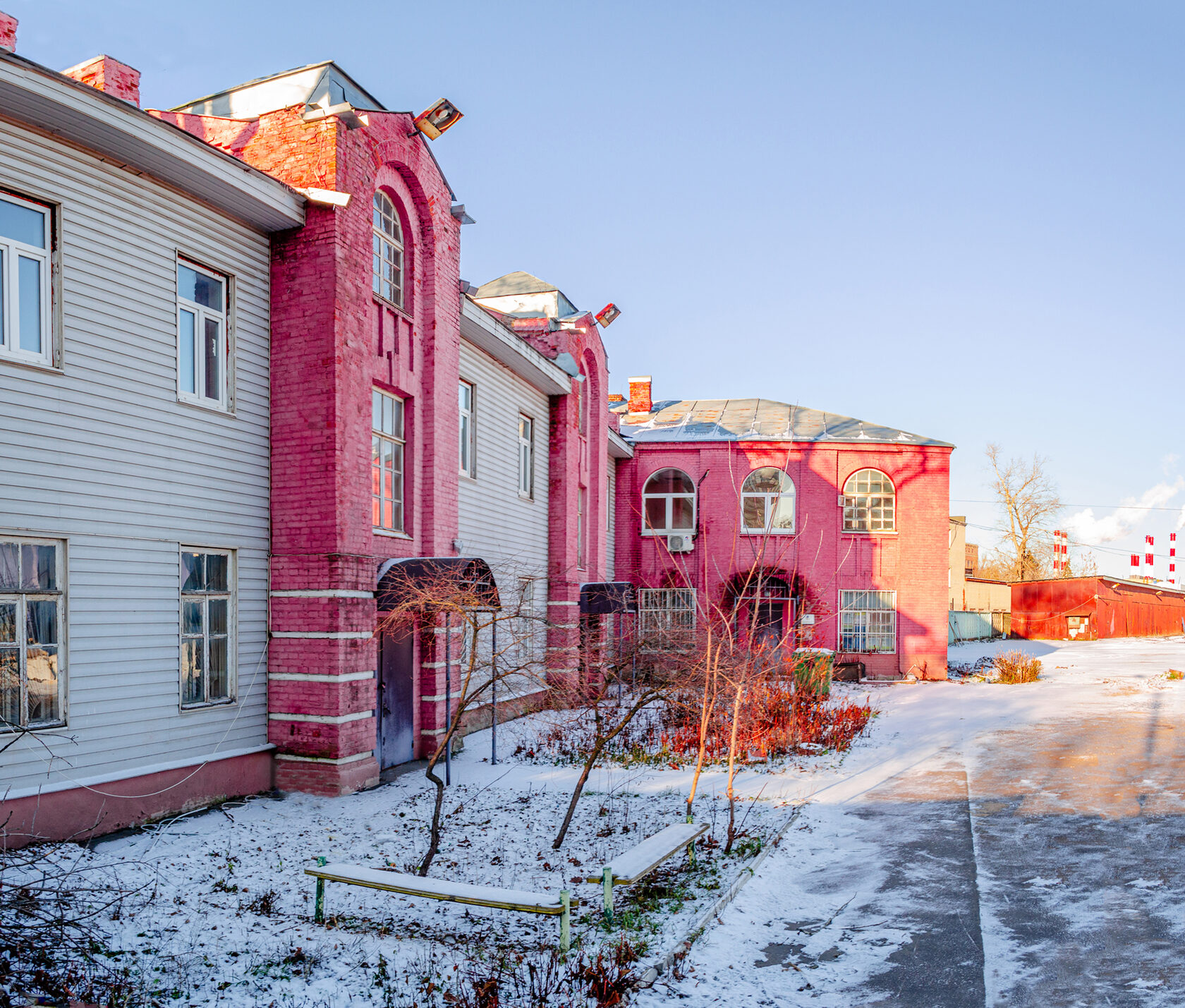
The dormitory of the State-owned Factory of Military self-propelled Guns (KZVS) in Podlipki, architect M.S. Lyalevich, demolished in 2020.

=== In Russia ===
- The Palace of M.K. Pokotilov in Saint-Petersburg (1909).
- The F.L. Mertens department store building in Saint-Petersburg (1911–1912).
- The tenement house of M.A. Soloveychik in Saint-Petersburg (1911-1913).
- The cinema/theater "Parisiana" in Saint-Petersburg (1913–1914).
- An administrative building for the Russo-American Manufacturing Firm "Treugol’nik" in Moscow (1916).
- A residential town at the KZVS military plant (State-owned factory of military self-propelled guns), which was built by the British company BEKOS in Podlipki, now Korolyov, Moscow region.

== Awards ==
Architecture

Other

- Commander's Cross of the Order of Polonia Restituta
