= Timeline of Warsaw =

The following is a timeline of the history of Warsaw in Poland.

== Prior to 19th century ==
- 1390 - St. John's Cathedral construction begins.
- 1413 - Duke Janusz I of Warsaw from the Piast dynasty confirmed and extended the city rights of the Warsaw Old Town.
- 1529 - Sejm of the Kingdom of Poland held in Warsaw.
- 1534 - Paper mill established.
- 1556–1557 - Sejm of the Kingdom of Poland held in Warsaw.
- 1563–1564 - Sejm of the Kingdom of Poland held in Warsaw.
- 1566 - Polish diet relocated to Warsaw from Kraków.
- 1573
  - 28 January: Warsaw Confederation signed.
  - Sigismund Augustus Bridge built.
- 1575 - Royal elections in Poland begin in nearby Wola.
- 1578 - George Frederick, Margrave of Brandenburg-Ansbach paid homage to King of Poland Stephen Báthory.
- 1580 - Old City Hall, Warsaw rebuilt.
- 1596 - Polish royal court relocated to Warsaw from Kraków by Sigismund III Vasa.

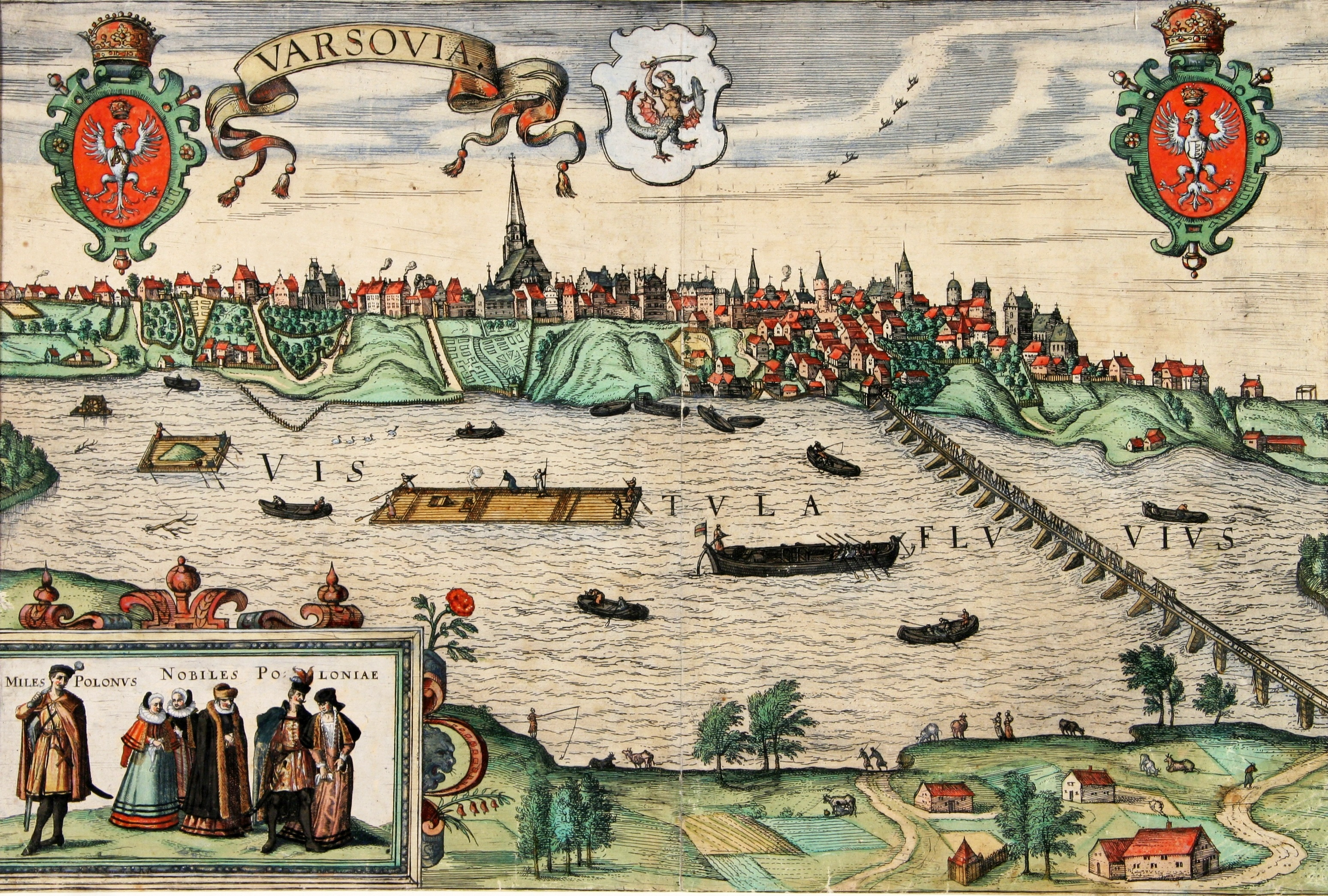
Warsaw in the early 17th century

- 1603 - Sigismund Augustus Bridge collapses.
- 1611
  - 29 October: Shuysky Tribute.
  - 16 November: John Sigismund, Elector of Brandenburg paid homage to King of Poland Sigismund III Vasa.
- 1619 - Royal Castle rebuilt.
- 1621 - George William, Elector of Brandenburg paid homage to King of Poland Sigismund III Vasa.
- 1641 - Frederick William, Elector of Brandenburg paid homage to King of Poland Władysław IV Vasa.
- 1643 - Warsaw Arsenal built.
- 1644 - Sigismund's Column erected in Castle Square.
- 1647 - Benefiting from Poland's tolerance, Valerianus Magnus publicly performed a vacuum experiment (Torricelli's experiment), which contradicted official European science.
- 1648 - "Flying Dragon" ornithopter of Tito Livio Burattini took to the air.
- 1655 - City besieged by Swedish forces.
- 1656 - July: Battle of Warsaw (1656).
- 1664 - Burattini set up an astronomical observatory in Ujazdów.
- 1689 - Warsaw becomes capital of Poland.
- 1702 - City taken by Swedes.
- 1727 - Saxon Garden opens.

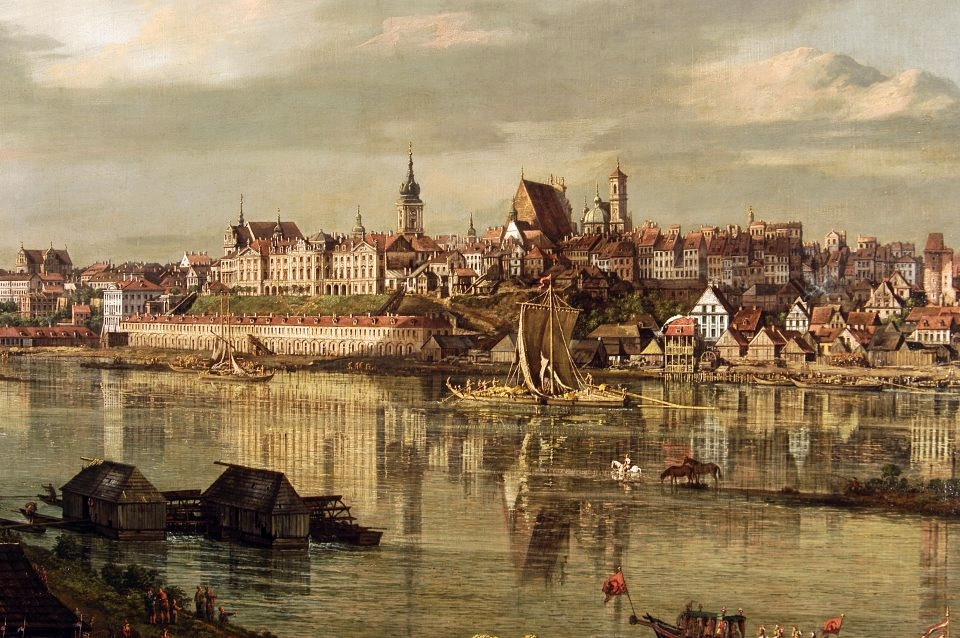
Warsaw in the 18th century (painting by Bernardo Bellotto)

- 1747 - Załuski Library founded.
- 1764 - City taken by Russians.
- 1765 - the Wawel Royal Archive moved to Warsaw and merged with the royal Warsaw Secret Archives.
- 1775 - Polish 6th Infantry Regiment stationed in Warsaw.
- 1780 - Polish 3rd Infantry Regiment stationed in Warsaw.
- 1785 - Jabłonowski Palace built.
- 1786 - Królikarnia completed.
- 1788 - Lazienki gardens laid out.
- 1789 - Polish 11th Infantry Regiment stationed in Warsaw.
- 1790
  - 1st Artillery Brigade of the Polish Crown Army formed and garrisoned in Warsaw.
  - 11th Infantry Regiment relocated from Warsaw to Gniezno.
- 1791 - Praga becomes part of city.
- 1792
  - Polish 9th Infantry Regiment relocated from Łowicz to Warsaw.
  - 11th Infantry Regiment relocated from Gniezno back to Warsaw.
  - 12 June: Polish 15th Infantry Regiment formed and stationed in Warsaw.
  - October: 9th Infantry Regiment relocated from Warsaw to Poznań.
  - Tyszkiewicz Palace completed.
- 1794
  - Polish 16th, 17th, 19th and 20th Infantry Regiments formed and stationed in Warsaw.
  - Polish 1st Vanguard Regiment stationed in Warsaw.
  - 17 April: Warsaw Uprising (1794) begins.
  - 4 November: Battle of Praga; city taken by Russians.
- 1795 - City annexed by Prussia in the Third Partition of Poland.

== 19th century ==
- 1804 - Warsaw Lyceum (school) established.
- 1806
  - City occupied by French forces.
  - Polish 1st and 2nd Infantry Regiments formed in Warsaw.
- 1807 - City becomes capital of Duchy of Warsaw.
- 1809
  - 22 April: Last session of the Polish Council of State before its evacuation via Płock to the new temporary capital of Toruń.
  - April–June: Austrian occupation.
  - 8 June: First session of the Polish Council of State following the liberation of Warsaw from Austrian occupation.
- 1810 - Music School established.
- 1813 - 8 February: Russians in power.
- 1815 - City becomes capital of Kingdom of Poland being in a personal union with the Russian Empire.
- 1816 - University of Warsaw established.
- 1817 - Warsaw Mercantile Exchange established.
- 1819
  - Museum and Institute of Zoology established.
  - Wolnomularstwo Narodowe (transl. National Freemasonry) founded by Walerian Łukasiński.
- 1830
  - Nicolaus Copernicus Monument unveiled.
  - November Uprising (1830–31); Polish–Russian War 1830–31.
- 1831 - September: Battle of Warsaw (1831).

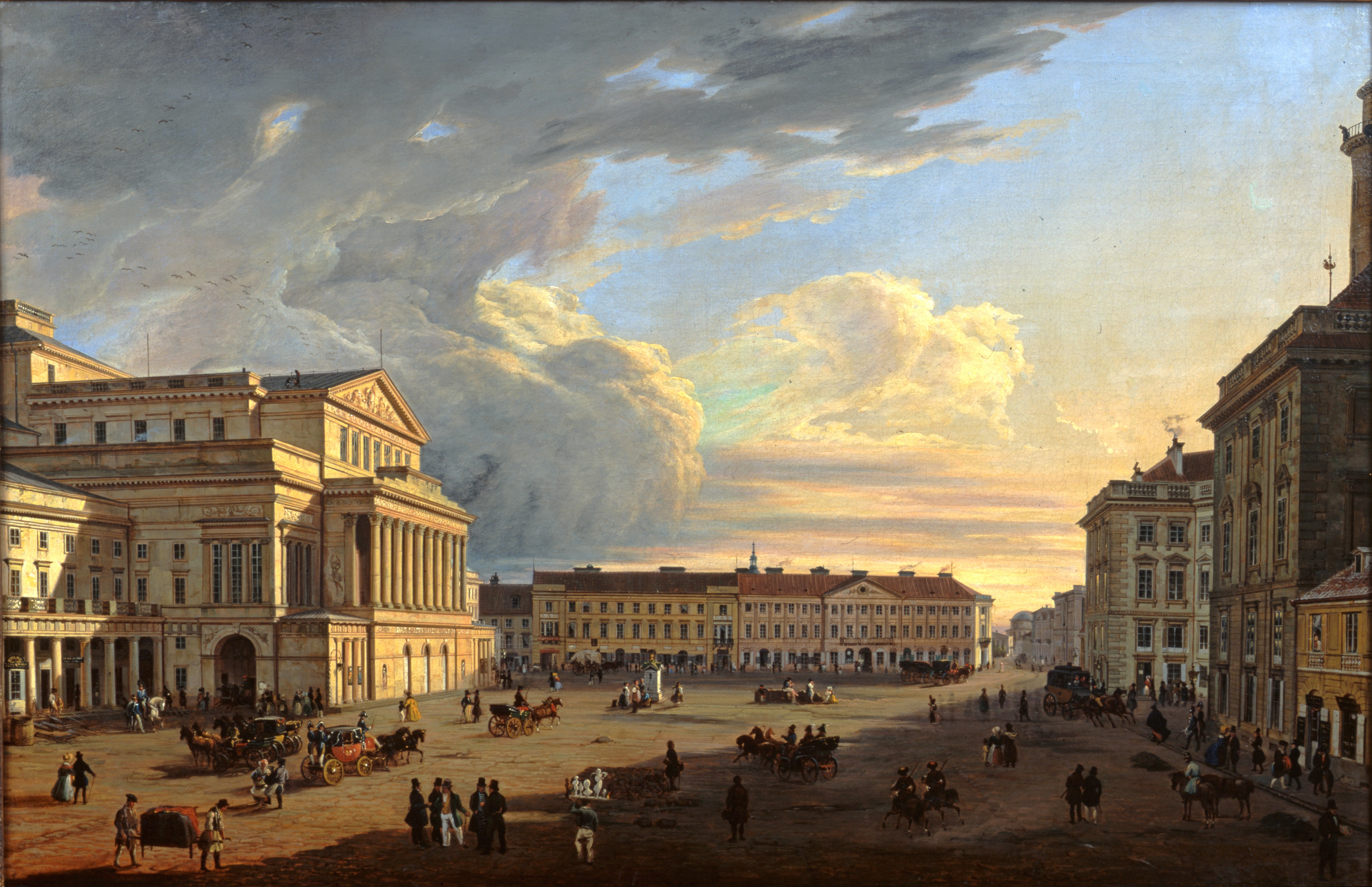
Theatre Square in the 1830s (painting by Marcin Zaleski)

- 1833 - Grand Theatre opens.
- 1845 - Warsaw–Vienna Railway begins operating.
- 1857 - Hotel Europejski in business.
- 1860
  - Krasiński Library opens.
  - Zachęta (art society) founded.
  - Population: 161,008.
- 1862
  - Szkoła Główna Warszawska (school) and Museum of Fine Arts established.
  - Ha-Tsefirah newspaper begins publication.
- 1863 - January Uprising.
- 1865 - Alexander Bridge built.
- 1866 - Horsecar tram begins operating.
- 1869 - Cathedral of St. Mary Magdalene built in Praga.
- 1872 - Population: 276,000.
- 1875 - Sokrates Starynkiewicz becomes mayor.
- 1878 - Great Synagogue built on Tłomackie Street.
- 1880 - Evangelical Reformed Parish church built.
- 1882 - Population: 406,261.
- 1887 - Population: 436,750.
- 1897 - Population: 624,189.
- 1898
  - University of Technology opens.
  - 24 December: Adam Mickiewicz Monument unveiled.

== 20th century ==
=== 1900s–1939 ===
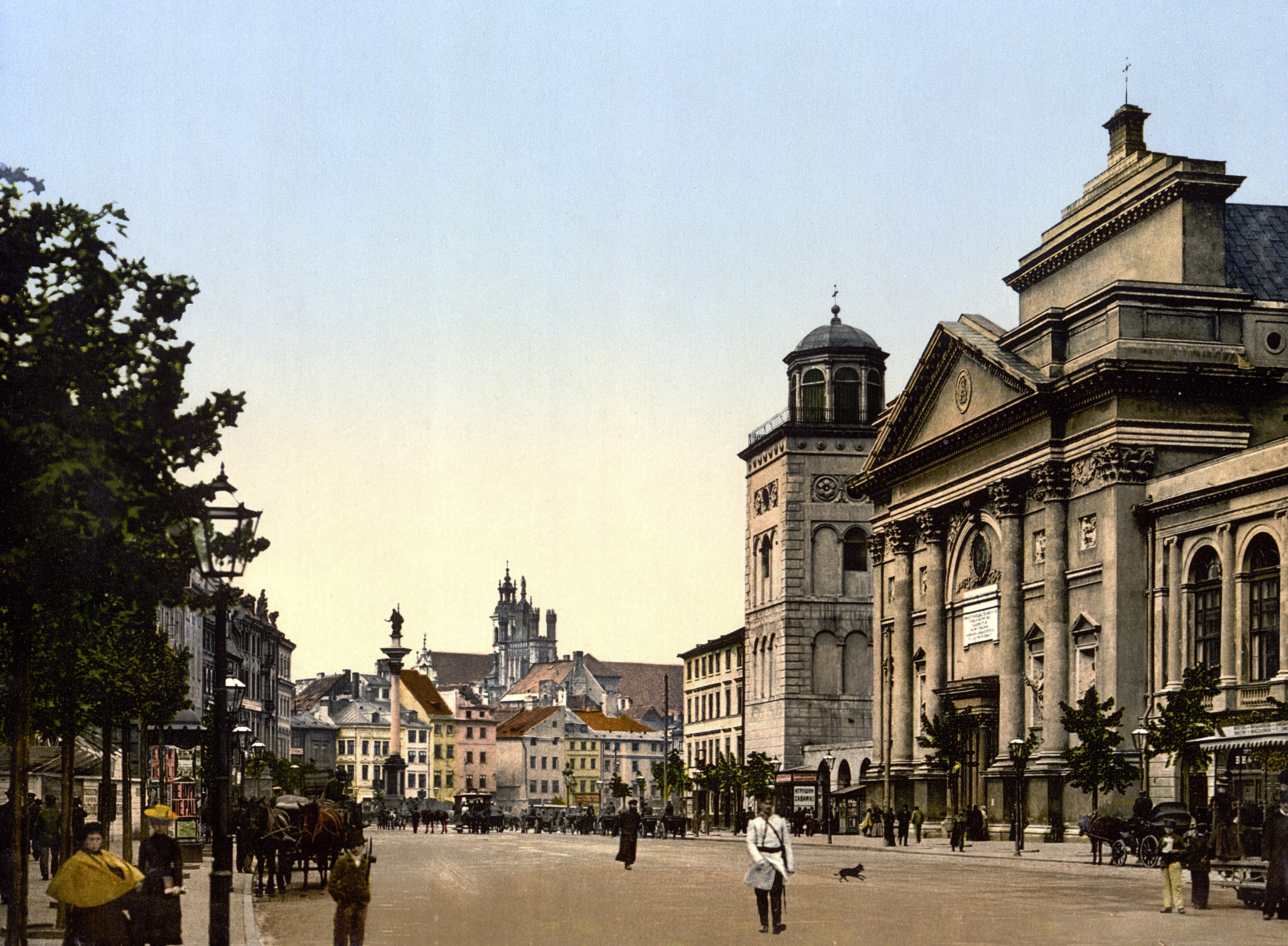
Warsaw around 1900

- 1901
  - Warsaw Philharmonic founded.
  - Hotel Bristol in business.
  - Population: 756,426.
- 1905 - Unrest. See also Alfonse Pogrom.
- 1906 - Yidishes tageblat newspaper begins publication.
- 1907 - Electric streetlights installed.
- 1908
  - Electric streetcar begins operating.
  - Iluzjon cinema opens.
- 1911 - Polonia Warsaw football club (future multi-sports club) founded.
- 1913
  - Hotel Polonia Palace in business.
  - Aleksander Kakowski becomes Catholic archbishop.
  - Polish Theatre in Warsaw opens.
- 1914 - Poniatowski Bridge built.
- 1916
  - Wola becomes part of city.
  - National Museum active.
- 1917 - Office for the Regulation and Building of the City established.
- 1919 - 4–5 January: 1919 Polish coup attempt.

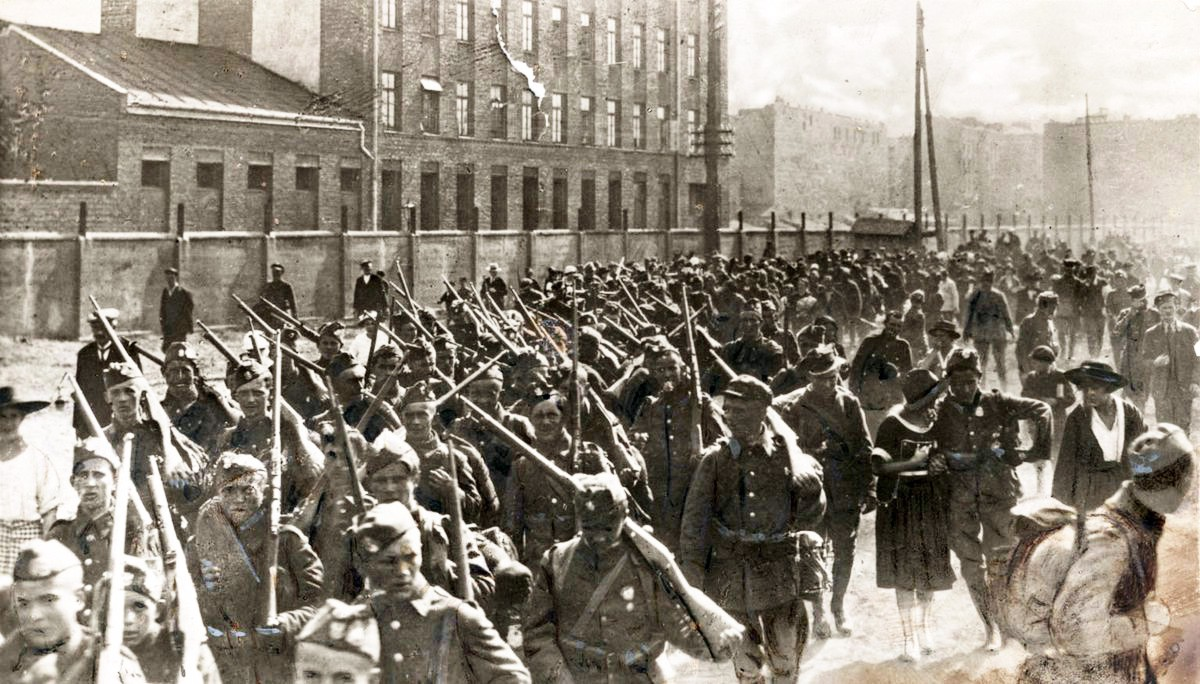
Polish infantry during the Battle of Warsaw (1920)

- 1920 - August: Battle of Warsaw (1920).
- 1921
  - KS Warszawianka football club (future multi-sports club) founded.
  - Population: 936,713.
- 1922 - 17 March: Warsaw Accord signed.
- 1924 - Blok (magazine) begins publication.
- 1925 - Tomb of the Unknown Soldier, Warsaw established at Piłsudski Square.
- 1926
  - 12–14 May: May Coup (Poland).
  - 14 November: Frederic Chopin Monument unveiled.
- 1927
  - AZS Warsaw wins its first Polish ice hockey championship.
  - International Chopin Piano Competition begins.
- 1928 - Arsenal Synagogue opens.
- 1929
  - 12 October: Warsaw Convention signed.
  - AZS Warsaw wins its first Polish women's volleyball championship.
- 1930
  - Instytut Propagandy Sztuki (art entity) founded.
  - AZS Warsaw wins its first Polish men's volleyball championship.
  - AZS Warsaw wins its first Polish women's basketball championship.
- 1931 - Warsaw Railway Museum established.
- 1933
  - Legia Warsaw wins its first Polish ice hockey championship.
  - Warsaw Cross-City Line (railway) begins operating.
- 1934
  - Polonia Warsaw wins its first Polish women's basketball championship.
  - Warsaw hosts the 1934 World Fencing Championships.
- 1935
  - August: Warsaw hosts the 6th Chess Olympiad.
  - 2 November: Hungarian Cultural Institute opened.
- 1936 - Museum of Warsaw established.
- 1937 - Polonia Warsaw wins its first Polish men's volleyball championship.
- 1938
  - Kino Femina (cinema) opens.
  - Coat of arms of Warsaw redesign adopted.

=== World War II (1939–1945) ===
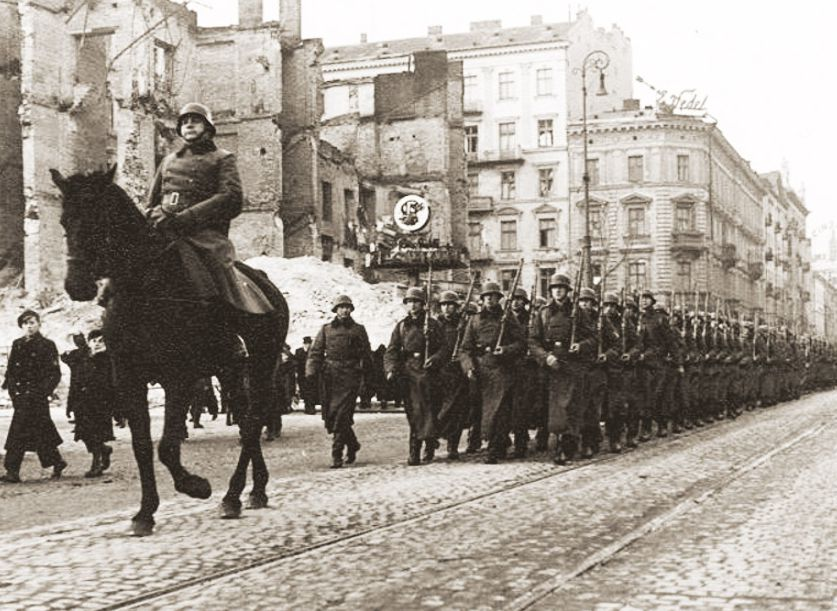
German troops entering Warsaw in 1939

- 1939
  - 1 September: Bombing of Warsaw in World War II by German forces begins.
  - 8–28 September: Siege of Warsaw (1939) by German forces.
  - 27 September: German occupation begins.
  - 1 October: The Einsatzgruppe IV Nazi paramilitary death squad entered the city.
  - 26 October: Polish Secret Teaching Organization founded.
  - 26–27 December: Wawer massacre perpetrated by the Germans.
- October 1939–February 1940: Mass arrests and executions of Poles carried out by the Germans in various parts of Warsaw and in the Kabaty Woods and Palmiry during the genocidal Intelligenzaktion campaign.
- 1940
  - Spring–summer: Second wave of mass arrests, roundups, deportations to concentration camps and executions of Poles carried out by the Germans during the AB-Aktion.
  - 16 October: Jewish Warsaw Ghetto established by Germans.
- 1941 - Another wave of mass arrests, deportations to concentration camps and executions of Poles carried out by the Germans.
- 1942
  - July: German Grossaktion Warsaw (1942) begins.
  - Pabst Plan created.
- 1943 - April–May: Warsaw Ghetto Uprising.

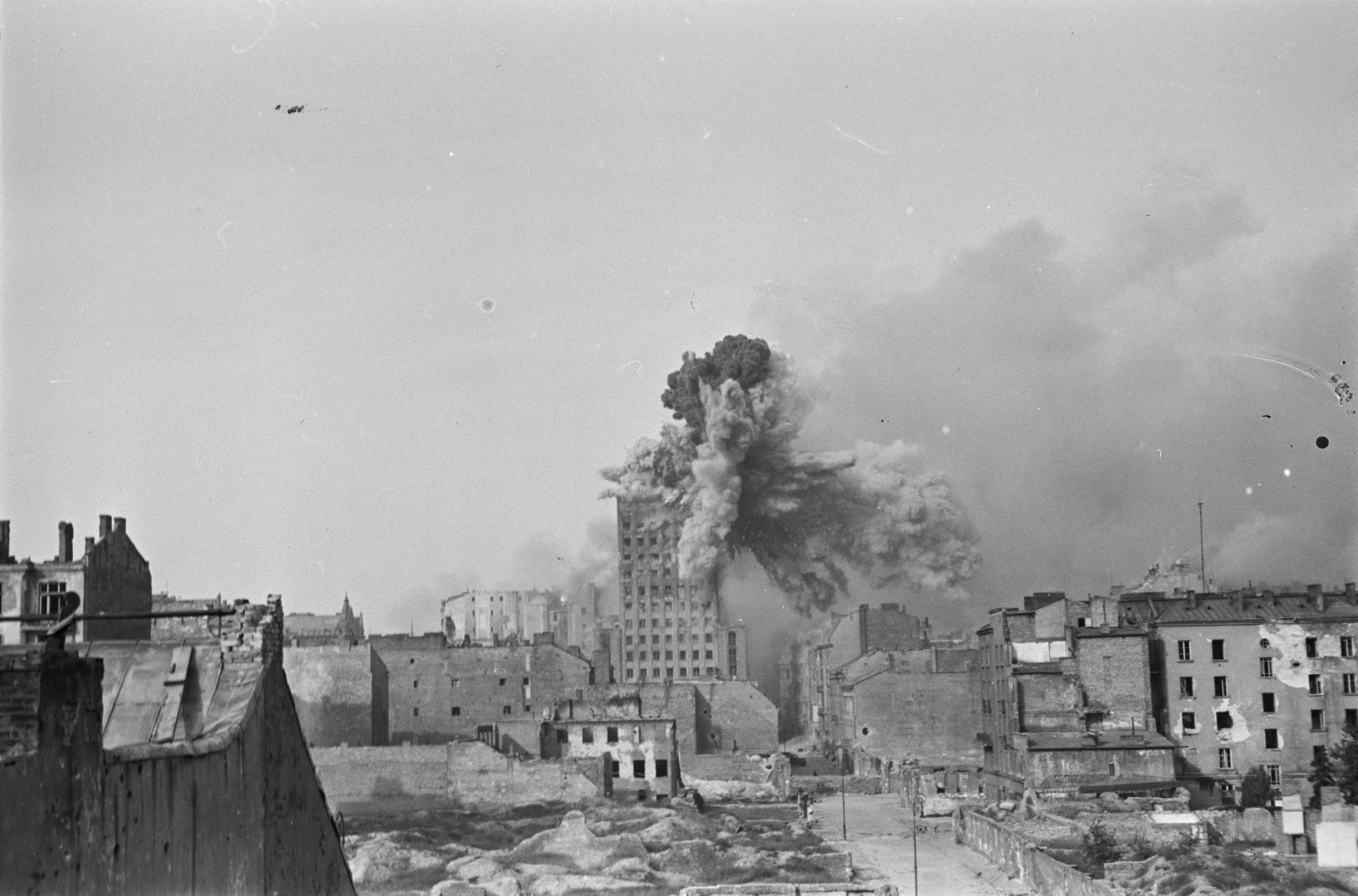
Warsaw Uprising

- 1944
  - Subcamp of the Oflag 73 prisoner-of-war camp for officers established by the Germans in Praga.
  - 27 July: German Festung Warschau established.
  - August–October: Warsaw Uprising against German occupation.
  - 1 August: Execution at Powązkowska Street perpetrated by the Germans.
  - 2 August: Massacres in the Jesuit monastery on Rakowiecka Street and in the Mokotów prison perpetrated by the Germans.
  - 3 August: Massacre at 111 Marszałkowska Street perpetrated by the Germans.
  - 3–4 August: Massacre at Bracka Street perpetrated by the Germans.
  - 4–25 August: Ochota massacre perpetrated by the Germans.
  - 5–12 August: Wola massacre perpetrated by the Germans.
  - August–September: Suppression of Mokotów by the Germans.
  - 21 August: Mass murder on Dzika street perpetrated by the Germans.
  - Mass expulsion of Poles from Warsaw.
  - Germans conduct planned destruction of Warsaw.
  - Życie Warszawy newspaper begins publication.
- 1945
  - January: Soviet forces take city; German occupation ends.
  - 14 February: Biuro Odbudowy Stolicy (city reconstruction bureau) established.

=== 1945–1990s ===
- 1946
  - Polonia Warsaw wins its first Polish football championship.
  - Społem Warsaw wins its first Polish men's volleyball championship.
- 1947 - AZS Warsaw wins its first Polish men's basketball championship.
- 1948
  - Stefan Wyszyński becomes Catholic archbishop.
  - PKM Warsaw wins its first Team Speedway Polish Championship.
  - Spójnia Warsaw wins its first Polish women's basketball championship.

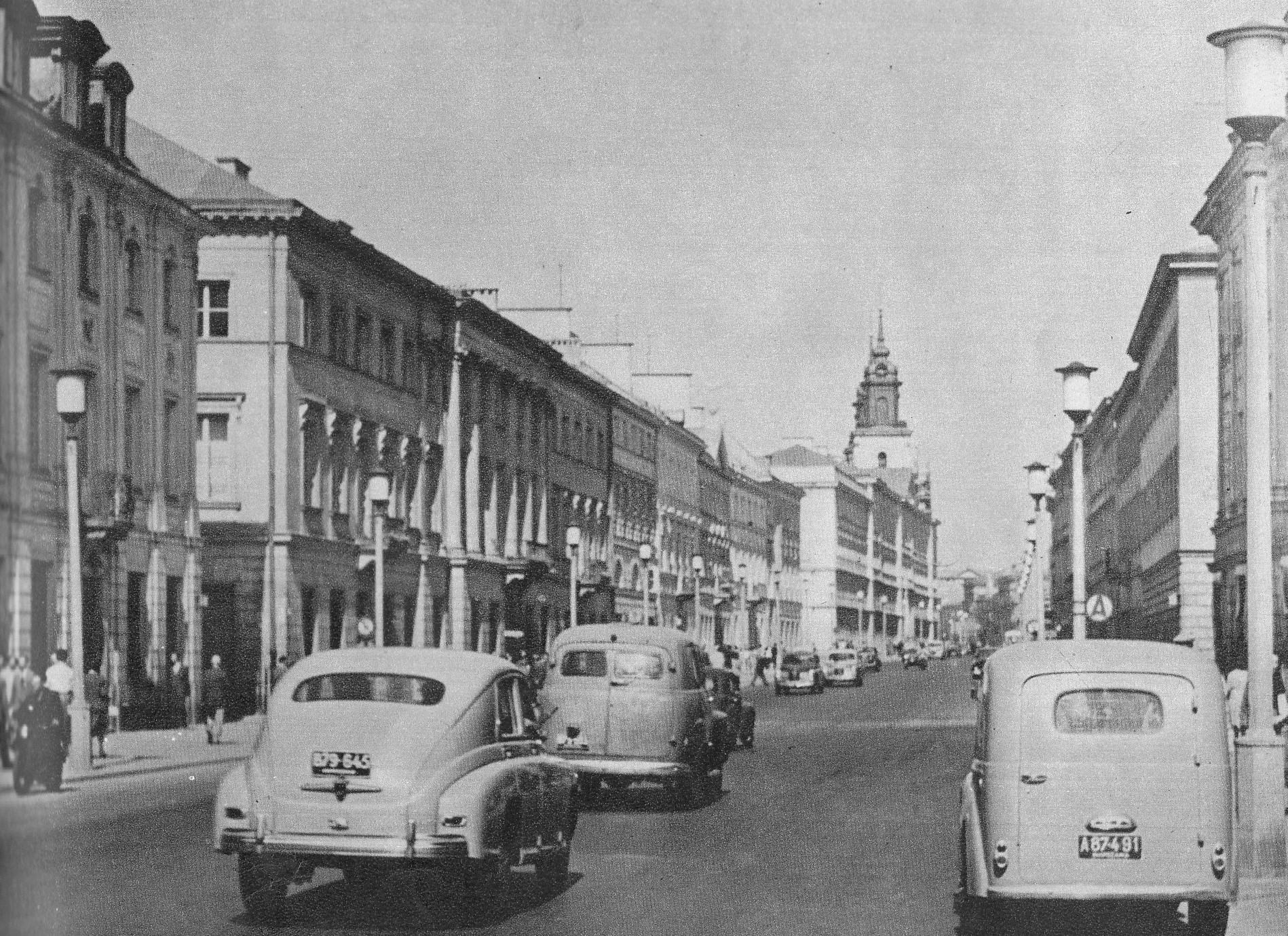
Warsaw in 1950

- 1949 - Six-Year Plan for the Reconstruction of Warsaw created.
- 1950 - Adam Mickiewicz Museum of Literature established.
- 1951 - Białołęka, Okęcie, Wilanów, and Włochy become part of city.
- 1952 - 22 July: Constitution Square inaugurated.
- 1953 - Old Town Market Place restored.
- 1954 - Fryderyk Chopin Museum established.
- 1955
  - 10th-Anniversary Stadium opens.
  - Crooked Circle Club active.
  - Palace of Culture and Science built.
  - International Warsaw Pact military alliance headquartered in city.
  - Legia Warsaw wins its first Polish football championship.
- 1956
  - Legia Warsaw wins its first Polish men's basketball championship.
  - Poles demonstrate solidarity with the Hungarian Revolution of 1956, massively bring aid to the Hungarian Cultural Institute, organize fundraising for Hungarians (see also Hungary–Poland relations).
- 1957 - AZS Warsaw wins its first Polish rugby championship.
- 1959
  - Polonia Warsaw wins its first Polish men's basketball championship.
  - Kampinos National Park created near city.
- 1961
  - Warsaw Chamber Opera founded.
  - Legia Warsaw wins its first Polish women's volleyball championship.
- 1962 - Legia Warsaw wins its first Polish men's volleyball championship.
- 1963 - St. John's Cathedral rebuilt.
- 1964
  - 20 July: Monument to the Heroes of Warsaw unveiled.
  - Skra Warsaw wins its first Polish rugby championship.

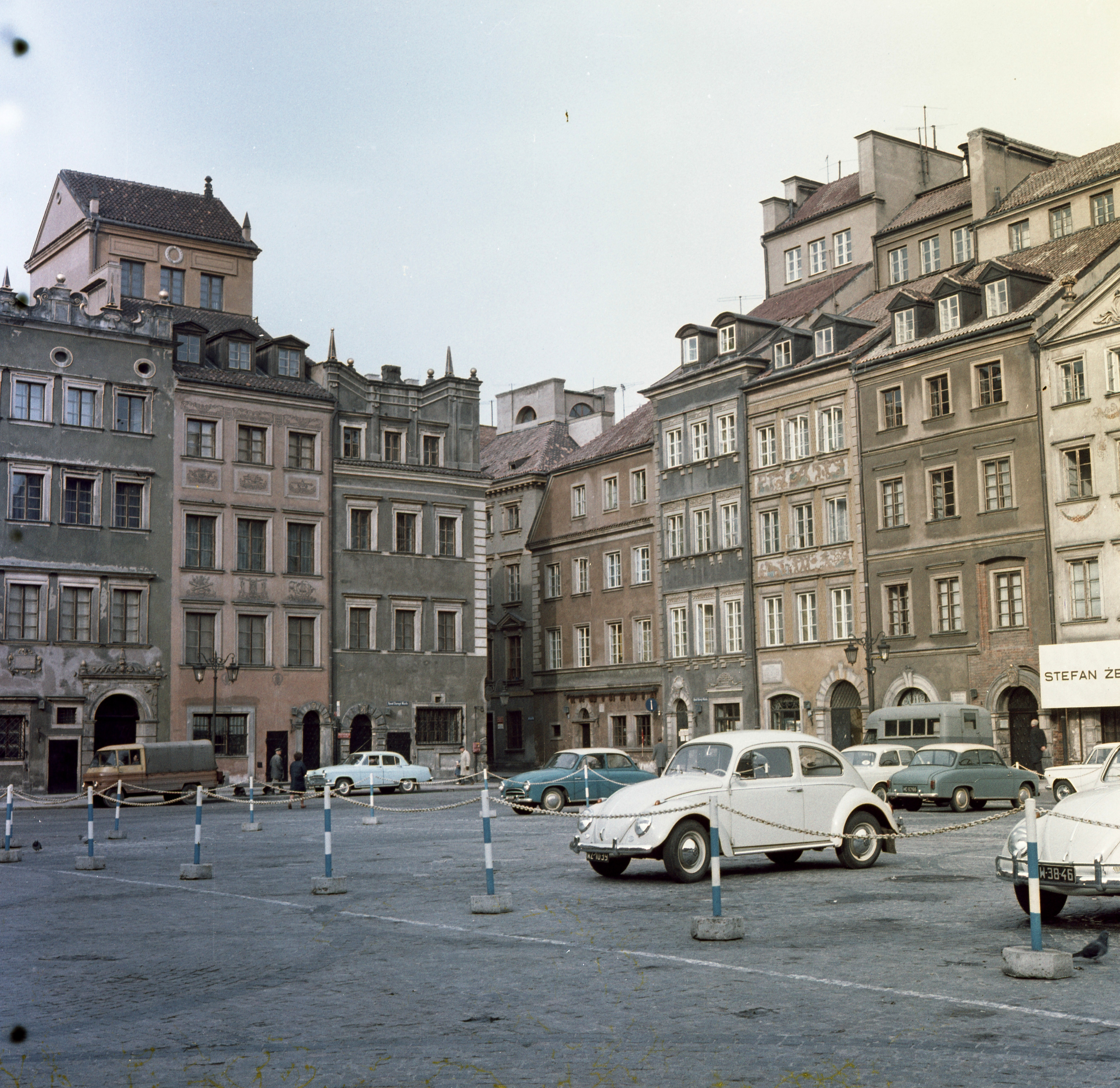
Warsaw Old Town in 1965

- 1965
  - September: City co-hosts the 1965 FIVB Volleyball Men's World Cup.
  - Population: 1,252,558.
- 1966 - Foksal Gallery of art opens.
- 1967
  - Maria Skłodowska-Curie Museum opened.
  - Jerzy Majewski becomes mayor.
- 1973 - Nusantara Archipelago Museum established.
- 1974
  - Łazienkowski Bridge opens.
  - Hotel Forum built on Marszałkowska Street.
  - Ujazdów Castle rebuilt.
- 1975
  - Warszawa Centralna railway station opens.
  - Intraco I hi-rise built
- 1978
  - Museum of Caricature established.
  - Intraco II hi-rise built.
- 1979
  - 15 February: 1979 Warsaw gas explosion.
  - June: Catholic pope John Paul II visits city.
- 1980 - Population: 1,596,073.
- 1981 - Józef Glemp becomes Catholic archbishop.
- 1983
  - Romuald Traugutt Philharmonic established.
  - Warsaw hosts the International Congress of Mathematicians.
  - 1 October: Mały Powstaniec monument unveiled.
- 1985 - Antonina Leśniewska Museum of Pharmacy established.
- 1987 - Warsaw hosts the 1987 IAAF World Cross Country Championships.
- 1989
  - 4 April: Polish Round Table Agreement signed in Warsaw.
  - Gazeta Wyborcza newspaper begins publication.
  - Marriott hi-rise built.
  - 1 August: Warsaw Uprising Monument unveiled.
  - Monument of Jews and Poles Common Martyrdom unveiled.
- 1991 - Warsaw Stock Exchange reestablished.
- 1992 - Public Transport Authority established.
- 1993 - Katyń Museum established.

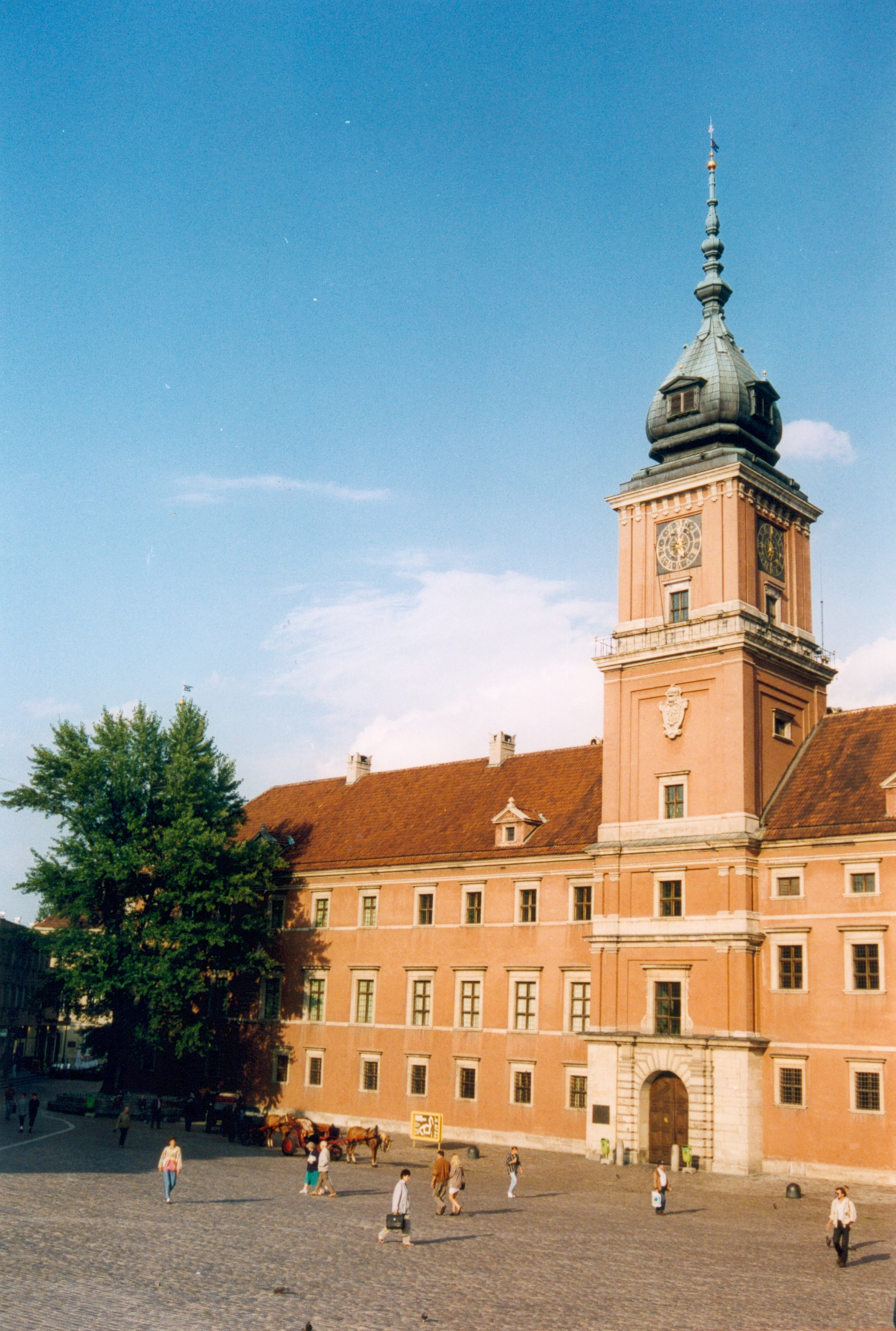
Royal Castle in 1994

- 1994
  - City divided into 11 districts: Bemowo, Białołęka, Bielany, Centrum, Rembertów, Targówek, Ursus, Ursynów, Wawer, Wilanów, and Włochy.
  - Warsaw Business Journal begins publication.
  - Polish-Japanese Academy of Information Technology founded (see also Japan–Poland relations).
- 1995
  - Warsaw Metro begins operating.
  - May: Warsaw hosts the 1995 European Weightlifting Championships.
  - 14 August: Józef Piłsudski Monument unveiled.
  - 17 September: Monument to the Fallen and Murdered in the East unveiled.
- 1996 - Sister city relationship established with San Diego, US.
- 1997
  - Centrum Handlowe Targówek (shopping centre) opens.
  - March: Warsaw hosts the 1997 World Single Distance Speed Skating Championships.
  - May: Warsaw co-hosts the 1997 European Wrestling Championships.
- 1998
  - Centrum metro station opens.
  - Warsaw Financial Center built.
- 1999
  - City becomes capital of the Masovian Voivodeship.
  - 10 June: Monument to the Polish Underground State and Home Army unveiled.
  - Warsaw Trade Tower built.
- 2000 - Świętokrzyski Bridge and Cinema City Sadyba open.

== 21st century ==
- 2001
  - Kinoteka (cinema) opens.
  - Atrium Center built.
- 2002
  - Wesoła becomes part of city.
  - Siekierkowski Bridge opens.
  - Bęc Zmiana New Culture Foundation established.
  - November: Warsaw hosts the 2002 World Weightlifting Championships.
- 2003
  - March: Warsaw hosts the 2003 World Short Track Speed Skating Championships.
  - InterContinental Warsaw skyscraper built.

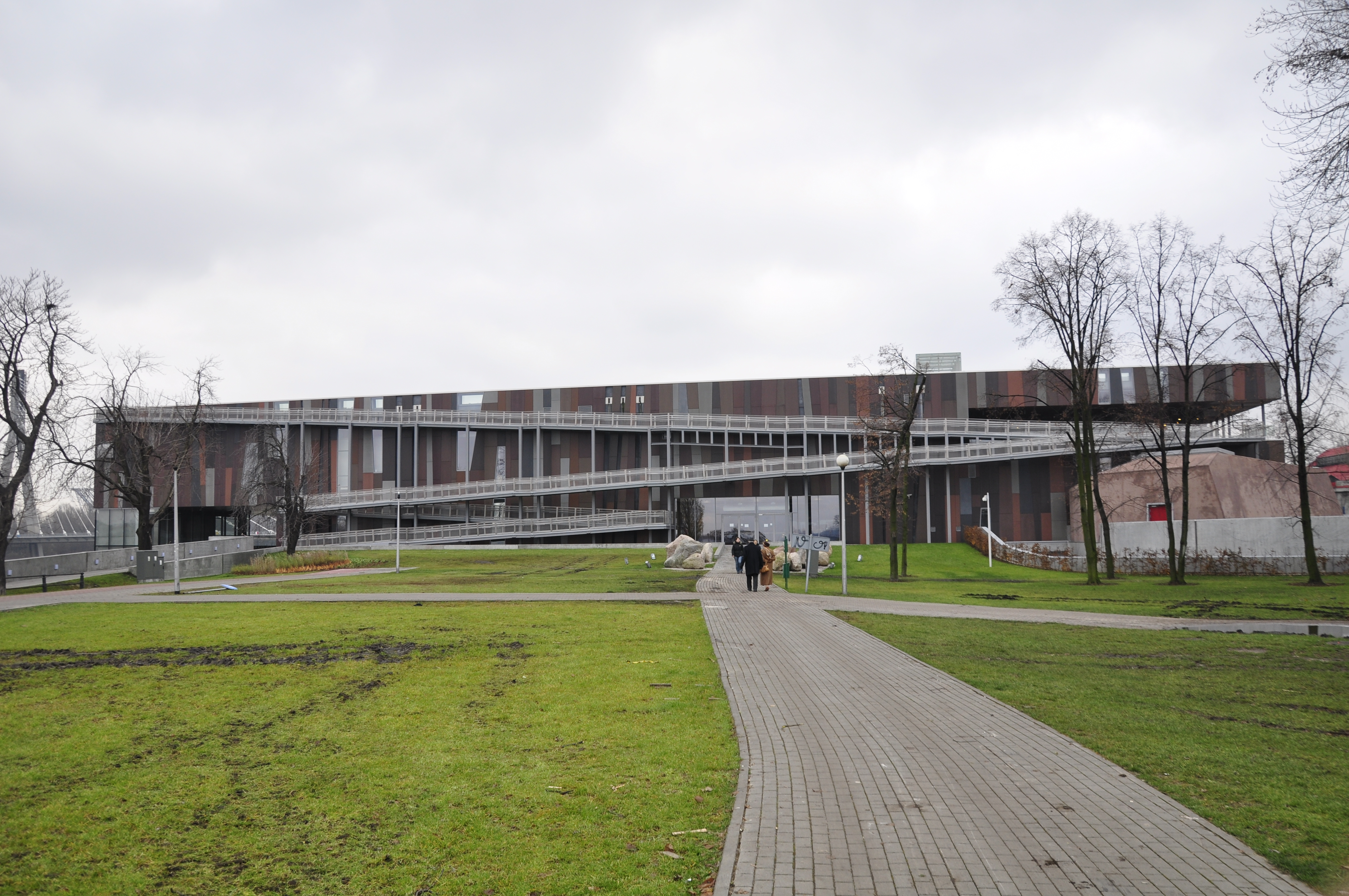
Copernicus Science Centre in 2010

- 2005
  - 29 April: Museum of Modern Art established.
  - 1 June: Copernicus Science Centre established.
- 2006
  - Janusz Korczak Monument unveiled.
  - Hanna Gronkiewicz-Waltz becomes mayor.
  - Rondo 1 skyscraper built.
- 2007
  - January: Warsaw hosts the 2007 European Figure Skating Championships.
  - 11 May: Monument to Georgian officers of the Polish Army who lost their lives in the Katyn massacre, in the Warsaw Uprising and on many fronts of World War II unveiled (see also Georgia–Poland relations).
  - 14 June: Nove Kino Praha (cinema) in business.
  - December: Warsaw hosts the 2007 European Judo Open Championships.
- 2009 – Warsaw co-hosts the EuroBasket 2009.
- 2010 – 16 November: Tadeusz Kościuszko Monument unveiled.

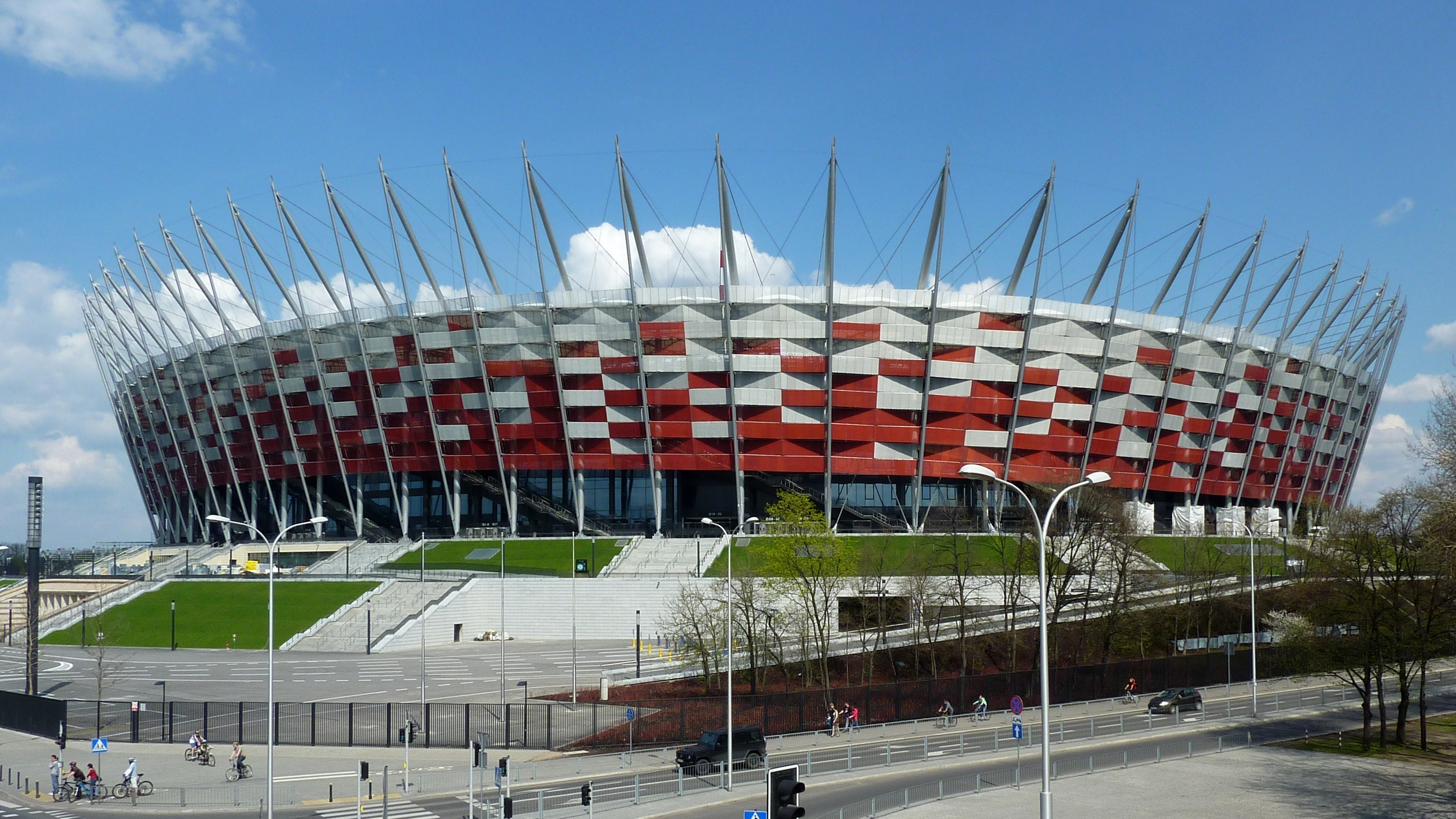
Stadion Narodowy in 2012

- 2012
  - National Stadium opens.
  - Warsaw co-hosts the UEFA Euro 2012.
- 2013
  - 13 June: Naming of the Skwer Ormiański (Armenian Square) in Mokotów.
  - 25 June: Khachkar gifted by Armenia to Warsaw unveiled at the Armenian Square (see also Armenia–Poland relations).
  - September: Labor demonstration.
  - Twarda Tower built.
  - Population: 1,724,404.
- 2014
  - 14 May: Honorary Consulate of Iceland opened.
  - 31 October: Digvijaysinhji Ranjitsinhji monument unveiled (see also India–Poland relations).

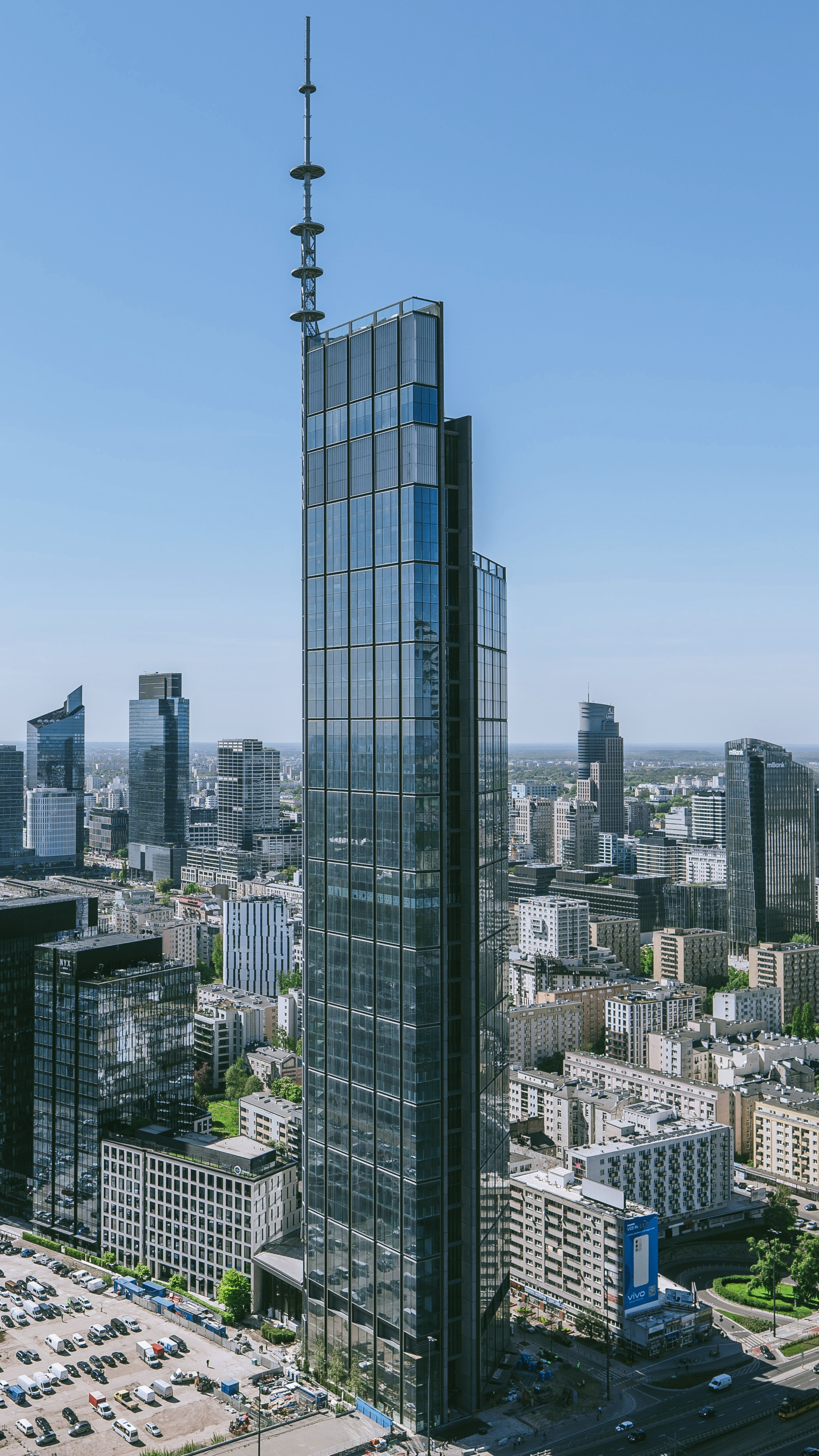
Varso Tower in 2022

- 2015
  - Warsaw Metro Line 2 begins operating.
  - 27 May: 2015 UEFA Europa League Final held in Warsaw.
  - 3 October: Danuta Siedzikówna monument unveiled.
  - December: Political demonstration.
- 2016 - 8–9 July: 2016 Warsaw summit.
- 2017
  - April: Warsaw hosts the 2017 European Judo Championships.
  - 13 May: Witold Pilecki monument unveiled.
  - August: Warsaw co-hosts the 2017 Men's European Volleyball Championship.
  - 19 September: Monument to Hungarian soldiers who aided the Polish Warsaw Uprising of 1944 unveiled (see also Hungary–Poland relations).
- 2018 - 22 September: Khachkar commemorating Pope John Paul II and the centennial anniversary of the restoration of Armenian and Polish independence unveiled.
- 2020
  - June: Warsaw hosts the 2020 European Table Tennis Championships.
  - November: Warsaw hosts the Junior Eurovision Song Contest 2020.
- 2021 - April: Warsaw hosts the 2021 European Wrestling Championships.
- 2022 - September: Varso Tower completed as EU's tallest building.
- 2025 - December: 73 Polish-Teutonic documents from the 13th-15th centuries, stolen by Germany from Warsaw during World War II, were returned by Germany to Poland, and restored to the Central Archives of Historical Records in Warsaw.
- 2026 - June: Medieval manuscript Gaude Mater Polonia, a ring of Polish King Sigismund I the Old, and a collection of miniature model trains from a pre-war museum in Warsaw, stolen by Germany from Poland during World War II, returned by Germany to Poland.

== Historical affiliations ==
Historical affiliations

Year Event

- 1200 Warsaw is founded
- 1413 Capital of Mazovia
- 1573 Warsaw Confederation and the first free election
- 1596 Capital of Poland
- 1641 Prussian Homage
- 1655 Deluge
- 1700 Great Northern War
- 1747 Załuski Library founded
- 1788 Great Sejm begins
- 1791 Polish Constitution passed
- 1794 Warsaw Uprising and Massacre of Praga
- 1795 Third partition of Poland
- 1800 Warsaw Society of Friends of Learning founded
- 1807 Warsaw Duchy established
- 1815 Congress Poland established
- 1816 University of Warsaw founded
- 1826 Warsaw University of Technology founded
- 1830 November Uprising
- 1862 National Museum founded
- 1863 January Uprising
- 1866 Warsaw Tramway started
- 1914 World War I
- 1920 Battle of Warsaw
- 1925 Polskie Radio started
- 1928 National Library established
- 1934 Warsaw Chopin Airport started
- 1939 World War II
- 1939 Siege of Warsaw
- 1943 Warsaw Ghetto Uprising
- 1944 Warsaw Uprising
- 1944 The expulsion of the population and
  planned destruction of Warsaw by German Army
- 1945 Rebuilding of Warsaw begins
- 1955 Warsaw Pact signed
- 1989 Polish Round Table Agreement
- 1991 Warsaw Stock Exchange established
- 1995 Warsaw Metro started

== See also ==
- History of Warsaw
- List of mayors of Warsaw
- List of bishops and archbishops of Warsaw
- Timelines of other cities in Masovian Voivodeship: Płock, Radom

== Bibliography ==
Published in 18th and 19th centuries

- William Coxe (1784), "Warsaw", Travels into Poland, Russia, Sweden and Denmark, London: T. Cadell, OCLC 654136
- M. Ross (1835). "Cities and Towns: Warsaw". History of Poland. Newcastle: Pattison & Ross.
- Charles Knight, ed. (1866). "Warsaw". Geography. English Cyclopaedia. Vol. 4. London: Bradbury, Evans, & Co. hdl:2027/nyp.33433000064810.
- "Warsaw". Hand-book for Travellers in Russia, Poland, and Finland (2nd ed.). London: John Murray. 1868.
- William Henry Overall, ed. (1870). "Warsaw". Dictionary of Chronology. London: William Tegg. hdl:2027/uc2.ark:/13960/t9m32q949.

Published in 20th century

- "Warsaw", Chambers's Encyclopaedia, London: W. & R. Chambers, 1901, hdl:2027/hvd.hn52kd
- J.G. Lipman (1907), "Warsaw", Jewish Encyclopedia, vol. 12, New York
- Kropotkin, Peter Alexeivitch; Bealby, John Thomas (1910). "Warsaw" . Encyclopædia Britannica. Vol. 28 (11th ed.). pp. 334–335.
- Benjamin Vincent (1910), "Warsaw", Haydn's Dictionary of Dates (25th ed.), London: Ward, Lock & Co., hdl:2027/loc.ark:/13960/t89g6g776 – via HathiTrust
- Ruth Kedzie Wood (1912). "Warsaw". Tourist's Russia. New York: Dodd, Mead and Company. OCLC 526774.
- "Warsaw". Russia. Leipzig: Karl Baedeker. 1914. OCLC 1328163.
- William Henry Beable (1919), "Warsaw", Russian Gazetteer and Guide, London: Russian Outlook
- Stephen D. Corrsin (1990). "Language Use in Cultural and Political Change in Pre-1914 Warsaw: Poles, Jews, and Russification". Slavonic and East European Review. 68 (1): 69–90. JSTOR 4210168.
- "Warsaw", Poland, Rough Guides, 1994, p. 49, OL 9003368M
- Trudy Ring, ed. (1995). "Warsaw". International Dictionary of Historic Places: Northern Europe. Fitzroy Dearborn. p. 781+. ISBN 978-1-136-63944-9.
- Scott Ury, Barricades and Banners: The Revolution of 1905 and the Transformation of Warsaw Jewry. Stanford, Stanford University Press, 2012.
- David Crowley (1997). "People's Warsaw / Popular Warsaw". Journal of Design History. 10 (2): 203–223. doi:10.1093/jdh/10.2.203. JSTOR 1316132.
- Barbara Czarniawska (2000). A City Reframed: Managing Warsaw in the 1990s. Harwood. ISBN 978-1-134-43381-0.

Published in 21st century

- Barbara Czarniawska. (2002) Remembering while forgetting: The role of automorphism in city management in Warsaw. Public Administration Review, 62(2): 163-173.
- Tuna Taşan-Kok (2004). Budapest, Istanbul, and Warsaw: Institutional and Spatial Change. Eburon Uitgeverij. ISBN 978-90-5972-041-1.
- Scott Ury, Barricades and Banners: The Revolution of 1905 and the Transformation of Warsaw Jewry. Stanford, Stanford University Press, 2012.
- Theodore R. Weeks (2004). "A city of three nations: 'fin-de-siecle' Warsaw". Polish Review. 49 (2): 747–766. JSTOR 25779460.
- Wardzyńska, Maria (2009). Był rok 1939. Operacja niemieckiej policji bezpieczeństwa w Polsce. Intelligenzaktion (in Polish). Warszawa: IPN.
- Pia̜tek, Grzegorz (2020). Najlepsze miasto świata: Warszawa w odbudowie 1944-1949 (Wydanie I ed.). Warszawa: Wydawnictwo WAB - Grupa Wydawnicza Foksal. ISBN 978-83-280-3725-0.
