= Timeline of Płock =

The following is a timeline of the history of the city of Płock, Poland.

== Prior to 16th century ==
- 1075 – Roman Catholic Diocese of Płock established.
- 1079 – Capital of Poland moved from Kraków to Płock.
- 1138
  - Capital of Poland moved from Płock back to Kraków.
  - Płock became capital of the Duchy of Masovia, a provincial duchy of Poland.
- 1144 – Płock Cathedral consecrated.
- 1180 – Marshal Stanisław Małachowski High School (Małachowianka), the oldest still existing school in Poland and one of the oldest in Europe, founded.
- 1225 – Dominicans came to Płock.
- 1237 – Płock granted city rights.
- 1255 – City rights renewed.
- 1353 – Polish King Casimir III the Great created a fund for the construction of defensive walls.
- 1356 – Saint Bartholomew church consecrated.
- 1405 – Holy Trinity Hospital established.
- 1495 – Płock became capital of the Płock Voivodeship.

== 16th to 19th centuries ==
- 1655 – City invaded by Sweden.
- 1705 – City invaded by Sweden.
- 1793 – City annexed by Prussia in the Second Partition of Poland.
- 1806 – Polish 4th and 5th Infantry Regiments formed in Płock.
- 1807 – City included within the Duchy of Warsaw and made the capital of the Płock Department.
- 1809 – 25 April: Polish Council of State with Prime Minister Stanisław Kostka Potocki held a session in Płock during its evacuation from Warsaw—which was under siege by the Austrians—to the temporary capital in Toruń.
- 1815 – City became part of so-called Congress Poland in the Russian Partition of Poland.
- 1820 – Płock Scientific Society founded.
- 1827 – Fryderyk Chopin visited Płock.
- 1831 – Last Sejm (parliament session) of Congress Poland was held in Płock.
- 1863
  - Polish January Uprising against Russia fought in the area.
  - 15 May: Zygmunt Padlewski, leader of the January Uprising in the Płock region, executed by the Russians.
- 1885 – Rowing society founded.
- 1894 – City water tower built.

== 20th century ==
=== 1901–1939 ===
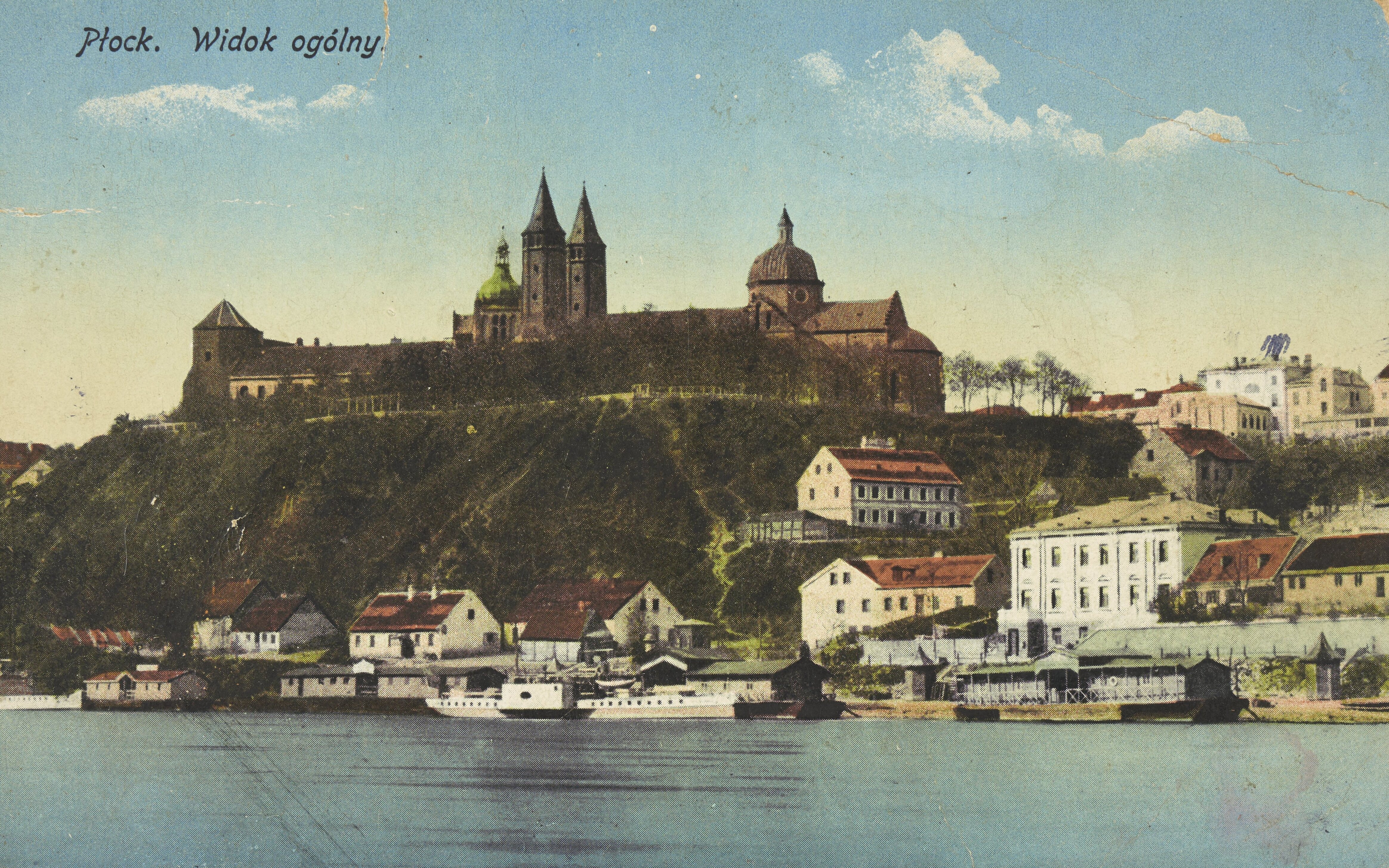
Cathedral Hill with the castle and Płock Cathedral in the early 20th century

- 1903 – Diocesan Museum founded.
- 1906 – Mariavite Church founded by Maria Franciszka Kozłowska.
- 1914 – Temple of Mercy and Charity completed and consecrated.
- 1915 – World War I: city occupied by Germany.
- 1918 – Płock became again part of Poland following the nation's restoration of independence.
- 1920 – August: Successful heroic Polish defense against the invading Russians during the Polish–Soviet War. 250 Polish defenders, including 100 civilians, killed in the battle.
- 1921 – Visit of Marshal Józef Piłsudski, Płock awarded with the Cross of Valour as the second Polish city to be awarded with a Polish military decoration (after Lwów).
- 1923 – Radziwie included within city limits.
- 1938 – Legions of Marshal Józef Piłsudski Bridge completed.

=== World War II (1939–1945) ===
- 1939
  - September: German bombing of the city at the beginning of the invasion of Poland and World War II.
  - September: Beginning of German occupation.
  - Nazi prison for Poles established by the Germans.
  - Polish associations, institutions and press closed by the occupiers.
  - Looting of Polish collections, archives, museums, the cathedral's ancient treasury and diocesan library by the Germans.
  - 21 October: Polish schools closed by the occupiers.
  - First secret Polish schools launched by Alina Rebinder.
  - 10, 13 November: Executions of 12 Poles perpetrated by the Germans in Płock.
  - November: First expulsions of Poles carried out by the Schutzpolizei.
  - Seminary converted into barracks of the SS.
- October 1939–March 1940: Massacres of around 200 Poles, incl. teachers, activists, shopowners, notaries, local officials, pharmacists, directors and members of the Polish Military Organisation, perpetrated by the Germans in Łąck near Płock during the Intelligenzaktion.
- 1940
  - 28 February: Archbishop of Płock Antoni Julian Nowowiejski and auxiliary Bishop Leon Wetmański imprisoned by the Germans.
  - March: Archbishop Antoni Julian Nowowiejski and auxiliary Bishop Leon Wetmański sent from Słupno, where they were imprisoned, to the Soldau concentration camp and eventually killed.
  - 4–9 April: Mass arrests of 2,000 Poles, incl. teachers, local officials, priests.
  - June: Further 200 Poles from various locations in the region imprisoned in the local prison, with some eventually deported to the Soldau concentration camp and murdered.
  - Massacre of 80 elderly and disabled people from Płock perpetrated by the German Security Police in Brwilno near Płock.
  - 1 September: Jewish ghetto established by the Germans.
- 1941
  - 20–21 February: SS and Schutzpolizei start the liquidation of the Jewish ghetto. First deportation of Jews to the Soldau concentration camp; sick and disabled people were killed on the spot.
  - 28 February: Massacre of 25 Jews perpetrated by the Germans.
  - 1 March: Ghetto liquidated, last Jews deported to the Soldau concentration camp.
  - Two forced labour subcamps of the local prison established by the occupiers.
  - Arbeitserziehungslager Schröttersburg-Süd forced labour camp established by the occupiers.
- 1942
  - 18 September: Public hanging of 13 Polish resistance members in the Old Town.
  - Arbeitserziehungslager Schröttersburg-Süd forced labour camp dissolved.
  - Winter: Freight train with kidnapped Polish children arrived to the Płock-Radziwie station; around 300 of the children froze to death and were buried by the Germans in the forest of Łąck near Płock.
- 1943 – Sicherheitspolizei begins deportations of Poles including teenage boys to the Stutthof concentration camp.
- 1945
  - 19 January: The Gestapo carried out a massacre of 79 Poles, who were either shot or burned alive.
  - 21 January: End of German occupation.

=== 1945–2000 ===
- 1947 – Wisła Płock football club founded.
- 1948 – Harvest machinery factory established.
- 1964 – Wisła Płock handball team founded.
- 1965 – Płock refinery completed.
- 1973 – Stadion im. Kazimierza Górskiego (football stadium) built.
- 1975 – City became capital of Płock Voivodeship.
- 1982 – Flood.

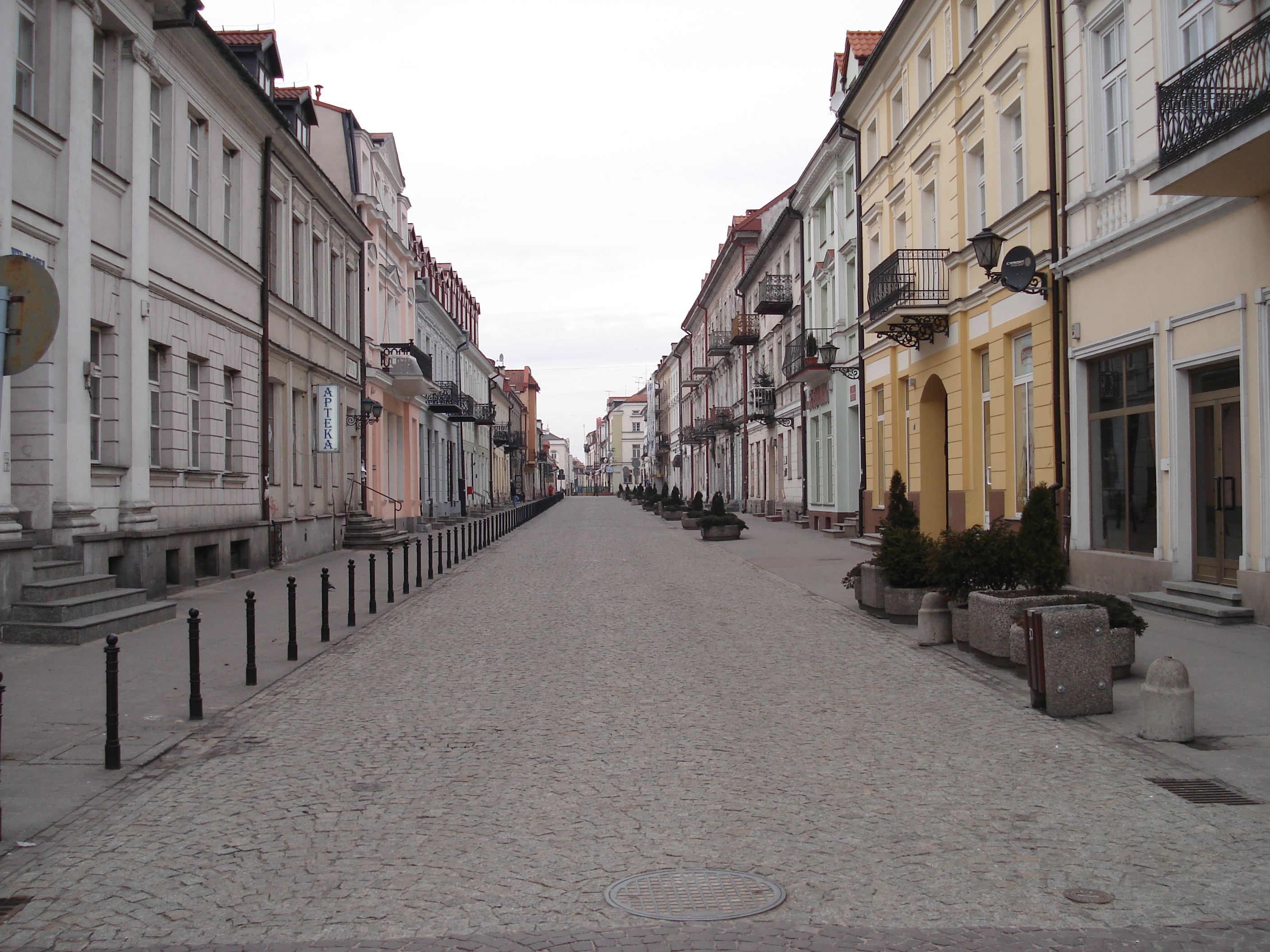
Płock Old Town in 2009

- 1991 – Visit of Pope John Paul II.
- 1995 – Wisła Płock wins its first Polish handball championship.
- 1999 – City becomes part of the Masovian Voivodeship following an administrative reform.

== 21st century ==
- 2007 – Solidarity Bridge completed.
- 2010 – Orlen Arena completed.
- 2011 – Płock Pier opened.
- 2014 – Mira Zimińska monument unveiled.
- 2018 – Płock co-hosts the 2018 FIVB Volleyball Men's Club World Championship.
- 2021
  - May: PKN Orlen Research and Development Center opened.
  - September: Stanisław Małachowski monument unveiled.
- 2023 – Płock co-hosts the 2023 World Men's Handball Championship.

== See also ==
- Timelines of other cities in Masovian Voivodeship: Radom, Warsaw

== Bibliography ==
- Wardzyńska, Maria (2009). Był rok 1939. Operacja niemieckiej policji bezpieczeństwa w Polsce. Intelligenzaktion (in Polish). Warszawa: IPN.
- Wardzyńska, Maria (2017). Wysiedlenia ludności polskiej z okupowanych ziem polskich włączonych do III Rzeszy w latach 1939-1945 (in Polish). Warszawa: IPN. ISBN 978-83-8098-174-4.
