= Timeline of Radom =

Timeline of the Radom history
Affiliations

Kingdom of Poland 1000s–1569
Polish–Lithuanian Commonwealth 1569–1795
Habsburg monarchy 1795-1804
Austrian Empire 1804-1809
Duchy of Warsaw 1809-1815
Russian Empire 1815–1917
Republic of Poland 1918–1939
General Government 1939–1945
People's Republic of Poland 1945–1989
Republic of Poland 1989–present

The following is a timeline of the history of the city of Radom, Poland.

== Middle Ages ==
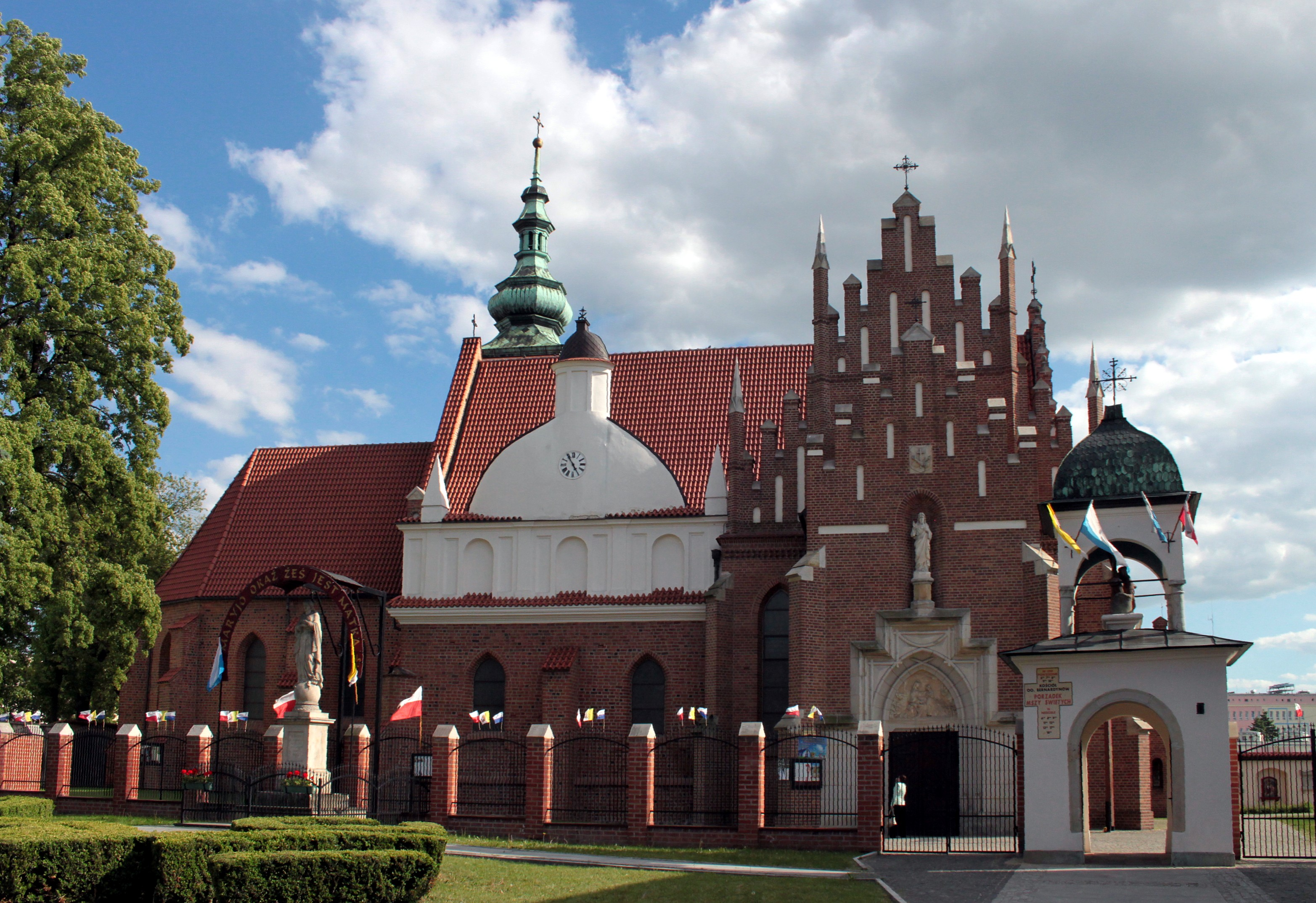
Saint Catherine church, founded by King Casimir IV Jagiellon

- 1155: first mention about Radom (Pope Adrian IV bull)
- before 1300: Old Radom granted with Środa Śląska rights (city rights based on those of Środa Śląska)
- 1233: first written reference to Radom's chief of castle - Marek
- 1340: Casimir III founds New Radom (Nowy Radom)
- 1360–1370: Casimir III founds St. John's Church
- 1364: Radom granted with Magdeburg law
- 1383: Jadwiga of Poland accepted by a Sejm held in Radom as a king of Poland
- 1401: First union of Poland and Grand Duchy of Lithuania signed in Radom
- 1481: Radom becomes a de facto capital of Poland after Casimir IV of Poland moves to Lithuania and his son, Saint Casimir to be, ruled the country in his absence from Radom
- 1489: Grand Master of the Teutonic Order, John von Tieffen pays tribute to Casimir IV of Poland in Radom castle

== Modern period ==
- 1505: a Sejm in Radom passes the Nihil novi constitution and Łaski's Statute, the first real bill of rights of Poland
- 1564: 1800 inhabitants, 180 houses, 14 butchers' shops, two baths and two wells
- 1613: Radom becomes the place where the Highest Fiscal Courts are held
- 1628: Great fire destroys the town
- 1656: Charles X of Sweden stays in town during The Deluge
- 1660: the city plundered by Sweden; after they leave the town has 395 inhabitants and 37 houses
- 1724: Augustus II the Strong grant to Radom privilege De non tollerandis judaeis
- 1737–1756: Kolegium Pijarów [the Piarists College] school founded
- 1763: Fiscal Tribunal moved to Warsaw; the town has 1370 inhabitants and 137 buildings
- 1779: 3rd Infantry Regiment of the Polish Crown Army stationed in Radom.
- 1780: 3rd Infantry Regiment relocated from Radom to Warsaw.
- 1780s: 3rd Infantry Regiment relocated from Warsaw back to Radom.
- 1795: After the 3rd Partition Radom is annexed by Austria

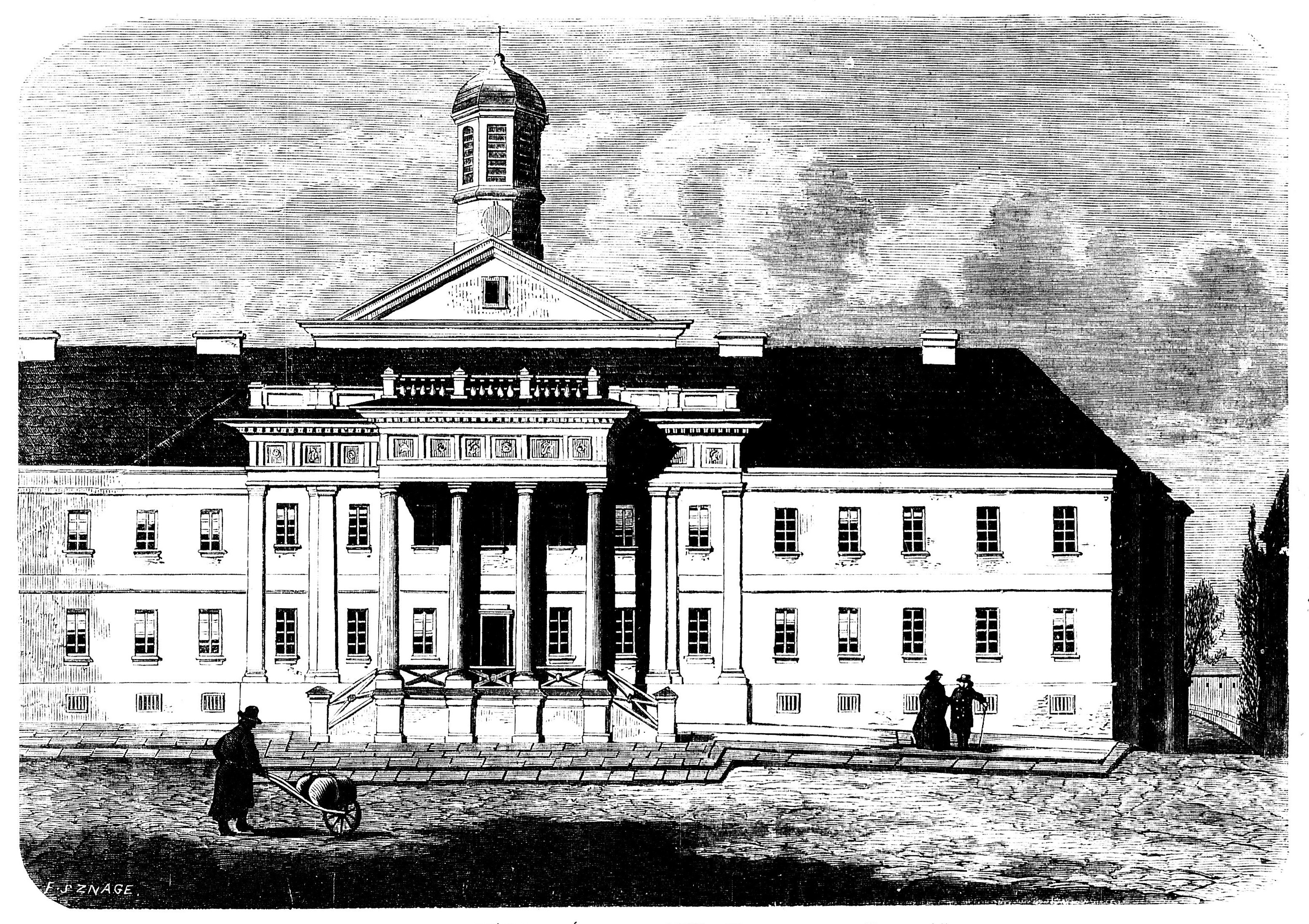
Piarist College in the 19th century

- 1809: Radom becomes capital of a department of the Duchy of Warsaw
- 1812: Catholic cemetery at Limanowskiego Street founded.
- 1815: Radom, after the Congress of Vienna, becomes part of Russian-controlled Congress Poland
- 1817: First lay school founded
- 1819: Fryderyk August Schnierstein opens a tannery, the date is considered a start of towns industrialisation
- 1844: Radom becomes the capital of Radom-Kielce government
- 1846: Saint Casimir hospital founded.
- 1867: Creation of Radom local government; the sewers are built
- 1885: Dęblin–Dąbrowa Górnicza railway opened
- 1901: electricity plant opened
- 1906: Notable Polish independence fighter Kazimierz Sosnkowski, and future Polish politician and general, escaped from Warsaw to Radom, pursued by the Russian Okhrana, and became the commander of the local Polish Combat Organization.

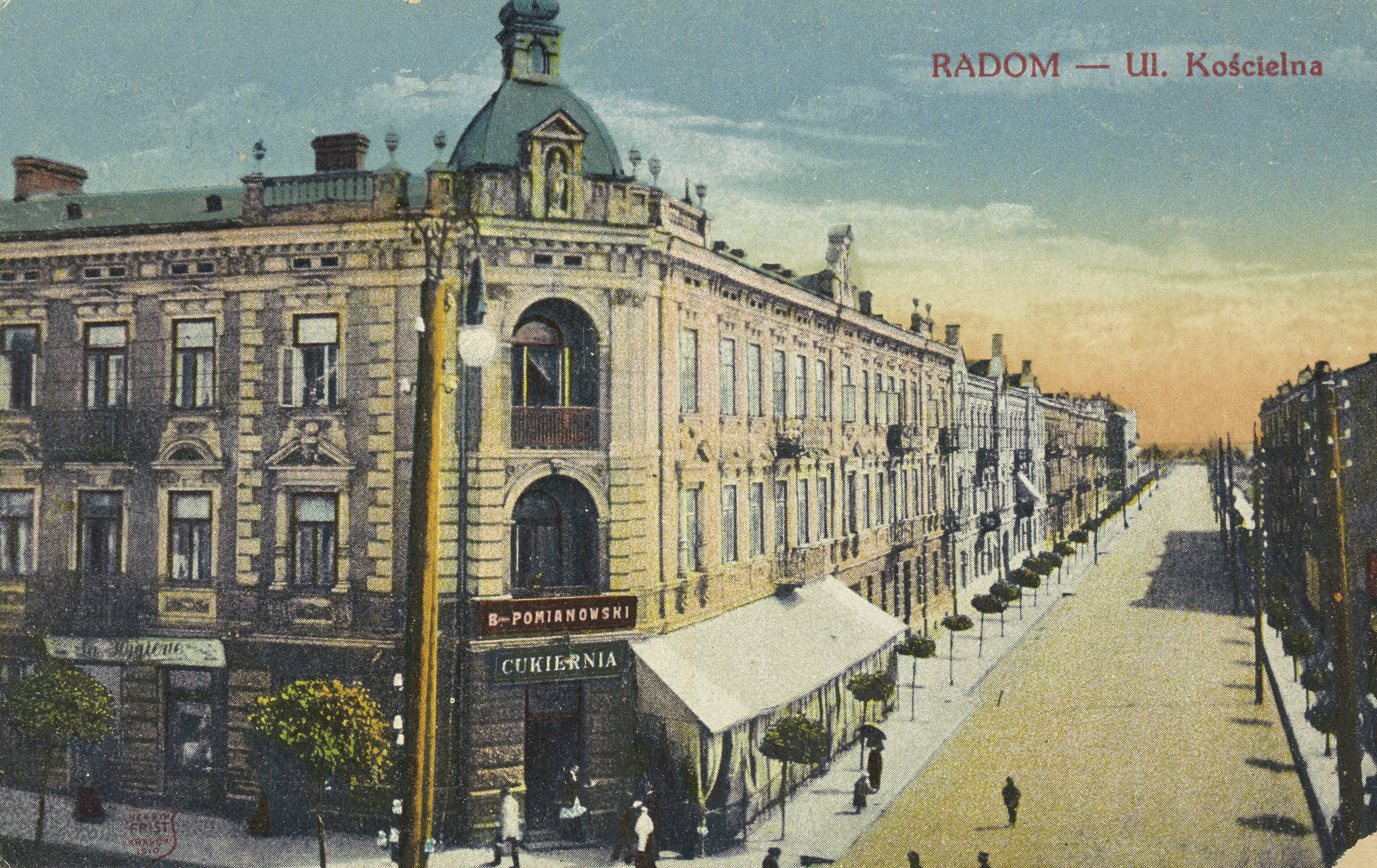
Kościelna Street in 1917

- 1908: Population: 39,981.
- 1910: Radomiak Radom football club founded.
- 1911: Radom has 51,934 inhabitants
- 1920–1939: Radom becomes a part of the Central Industrial Area (Centralny Okręg Przemysłowy); Chemical Plant, arms and munitions factory (Łucznik Arms Factory), gas works, telephone and shoe factories are founded
- 1921
  - Czarni Radom football club (future multi-sport club) founded.
  - State Railway Technical School moved from Skarżysko-Kamienna to Radom.
- 1922: 72nd Infantry Regiment of the Polish Army stationed in Radom.
- 1926: Broń Radom football club founded.
- 1935: Radom–Warsaw railway opened. It significantly shortened rail distance between Warsaw and Kraków
- 1938: 90,059 inhabitants

== World War II ==
- 1939
  - German invasion of Poland, Radom occupied and made the capital of the Radom District of the General Government
  - September 21: German Einsatzgruppe II entered the city to commit various crimes against the population.
  - September: The Germans closed down the local technical high school and established a hospital for wounded Polish and later German soldiers in its place.
  - October 24: The Germans carried out a public execution of 24 Poles.
  - November 5: The Germans carried out a public execution of 5 Poles.
  - December 2: The Germans carried out a public execution of 19 Poles.
  - December 14: The Germans carried out a public execution of 24 Poles.
  - December 15: The Germans carried out a public execution of 13 Poles.
  - December 19: The Germans carried out a public execution of 16 Poles.

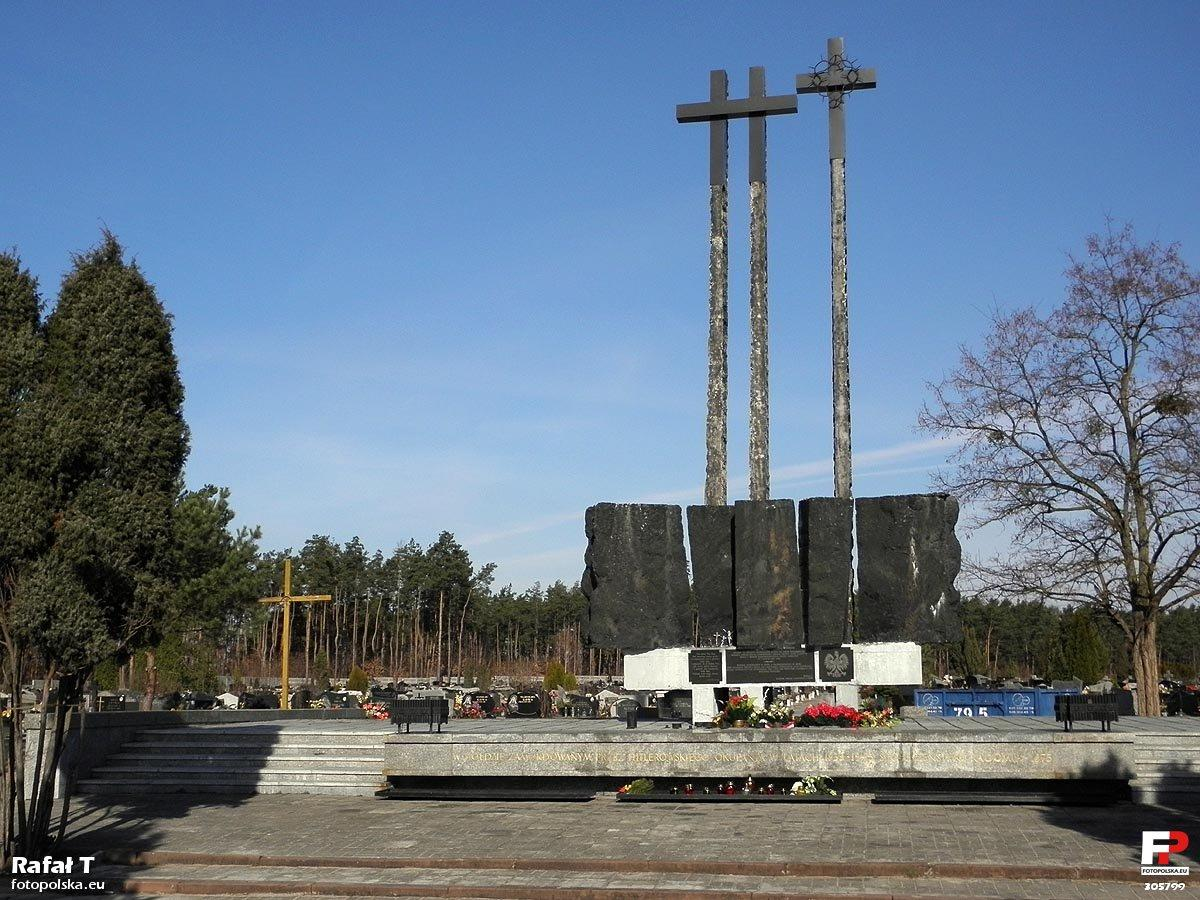
Monument and cemetery in Firlej where the Germans murdered around 15,000 Poles and Jews

- 1940
  - January 12: The Germans carried out a public execution of 10 Polish men.
  - March: Polish Rada Główna Opiekuńcza organization established a kitchen at the railway station that prepared meals for the most needy.
  - March 29: The Germans carried out an execution of 69 Poles from Stefanków in the Firlej district.
  - March 31: The German Feldgendarmerie carried out an execution of 43 Polish farmers, craftsmen and forest workers from Gałki in the Firlej district.
  - April–May: Around 100 Poles from Radom were murdered by the Russians in the large Katyn massacre.
  - May 16 and 24: The Germans carried out executions of 98 Poles, including teenagers, in the Firlej district.
  - July 10 and 15: Deportations of Poles from the local prison to the Auschwitz concentration camp.
  - August 20: Deportation of Poles from the local prison to the Auschwitz concentration camp.
  - October 16: The Germans established a forced labour camp for Jews.
  - November 9: Deportation of Poles from the local prison to the Auschwitz concentration camp.

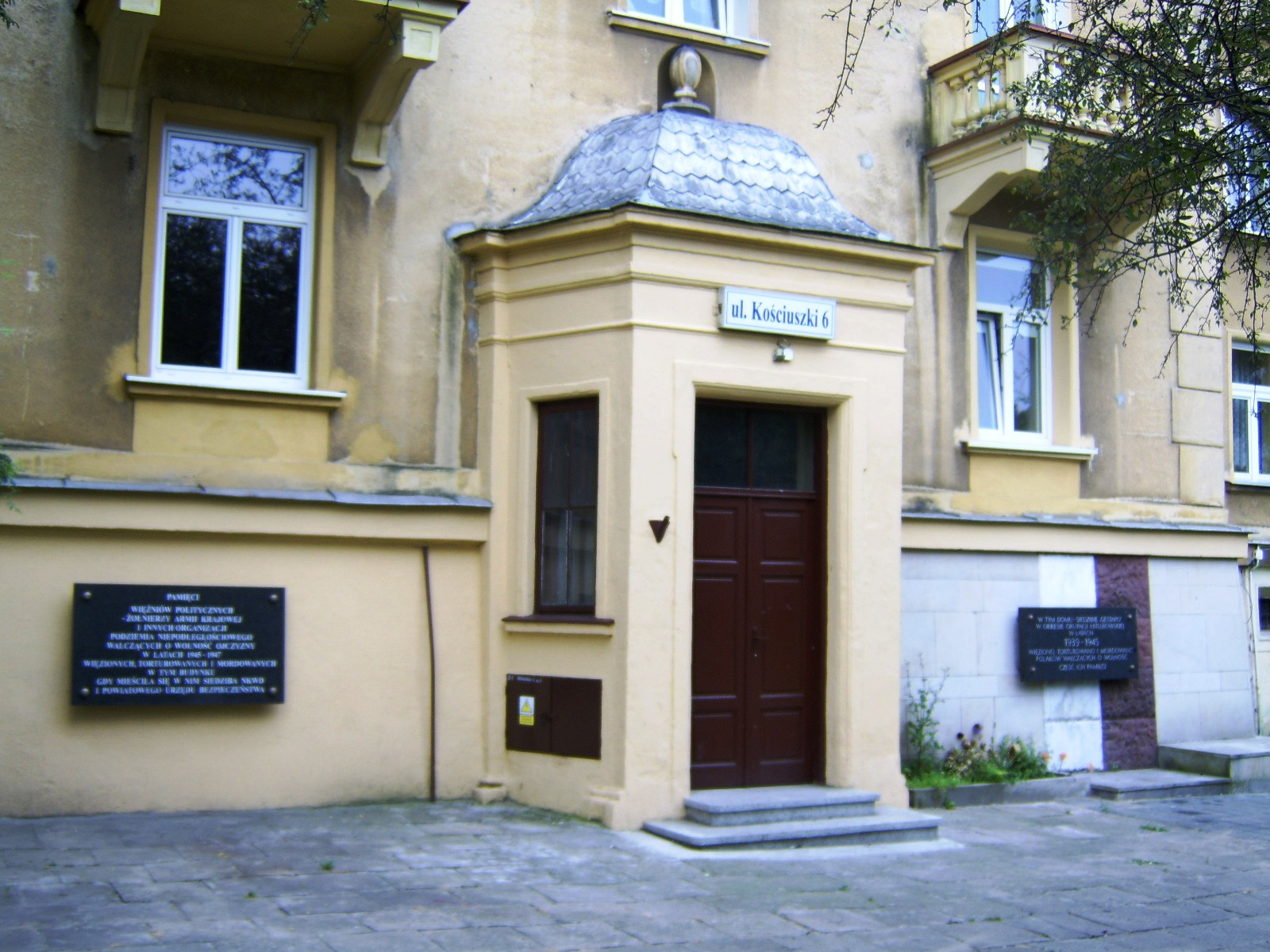
Former seat of the Gestapo and NKVD during the occupation

- 1941
  - January: First German execution in the present-day Kosów district.
  - April: Radom Ghetto established.
- 1942
  - September: The Germans discovered secret activity of the Polish resistance movement at the local arms factory and carried out mass arrests of its members.
  - October 12–15: The Germans carried out three mass public executions of 50 Poles, including 26 employees of the arms factory, and a pregnant woman.
- April 23, 1943: Polish resistance successfully assassinated the chief of the local German police.
- 1944
  - March 1: The Germans carried out an execution of 36 Poles.
  - March-April: Mass arrests of local Poles, including members of the Grey Ranks resistance organization, by the Gestapo.
  - 7 July: The Germans carried out a massacre of 30 Polish firefighters.
  - July: Radom Ghetto dissolved.
  - July: Partial evacuation of the German administration to Częstochowa.
  - Deportations of Poles the Dulag 121 camp in Pruszków to Radom, following the Polish Warsaw Uprising. 3,500 Poles expelled from Warsaw stayed in the city, as of November 1, 1944.
- 1945:
  - January 14: Last transport of prisoners sent from to Radom to Auschwitz, it only reached Częstochowa.
  - January 14: Last German execution in Firlej.
  - January 16: liberation from German occupation
  - January: The Soviet NKVD took over the former Gestapo headquarters.

== Contemporary history ==
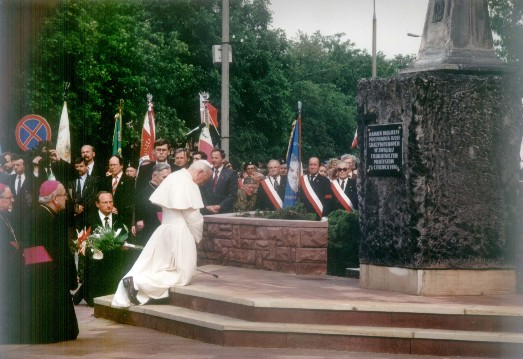
Pope John Paul II in Radom, 4 VI 1991

- September 9, 1945: Polish partisans attacked the communist prison and liberated nearly 500 prisoners.
- 1948–1975: Theatre (Teatr Dramatyczny) and an engineering school are opened.
- 1954: City limits were greatly expanded by including several settlements as new districts, including Długojów, Godów, Gołębiów, Halinów, Jeżowa Wola, Kaptur, Michałów, Prędocinek, Wośniki and Żakowice.
- 1957: Czarni Radom volleyball section founded.
- 1958: Monument to Polish workers of the local arms factory who were murdered by the Germans during World War II was unveiled.
- 1975: the city becomes the capital of Radom Voivodeship
- 1976:
  - June 25: Huge workers' strike against the communist regime; the city becomes one of the main centres of anti-communist opposition in Poland (see June 1976 protests)
  - July 17: Beginning of court trials of anti-communist protesters, in which 25 people were sentenced to prison.
- 1981: Monument was unveiled at the site of a German execution of 15 Poles on October 14, 1942.
- 1984: City limits were greatly expanded by including several settlements as new districts, including Długojów Górny, Huta Józefowska, Janiszpol, Józefów, Kierzków, Kończyce, Krychnowice, Krzewień, Malczew, Mleczna, Nowa Wola Gołębiowska, Nowiny Malczewskie, Stara Wola Gołębiowska, Wincentów, Wólka Klwatecka.
- 1996: Radomska Wyższa Szkoła Inżynierska promoted to the rank of a Kazimierz Pułaski Technical University of Radom (Politechnika Radomska)
- 1999: Radom becomes the capital of Radom County of the Masovian Voivodeship
- 2003: Rosa Radom basketball club founded.
- 2007: Radom Chamber Orchestra founded.

== See also ==
- Timelines of other cities in Masovian Voivodeship: Płock, Warsaw
- List of years in Poland
