= Execution at Powązkowska Street =

1944 Nazi executions in Warsaw, Poland

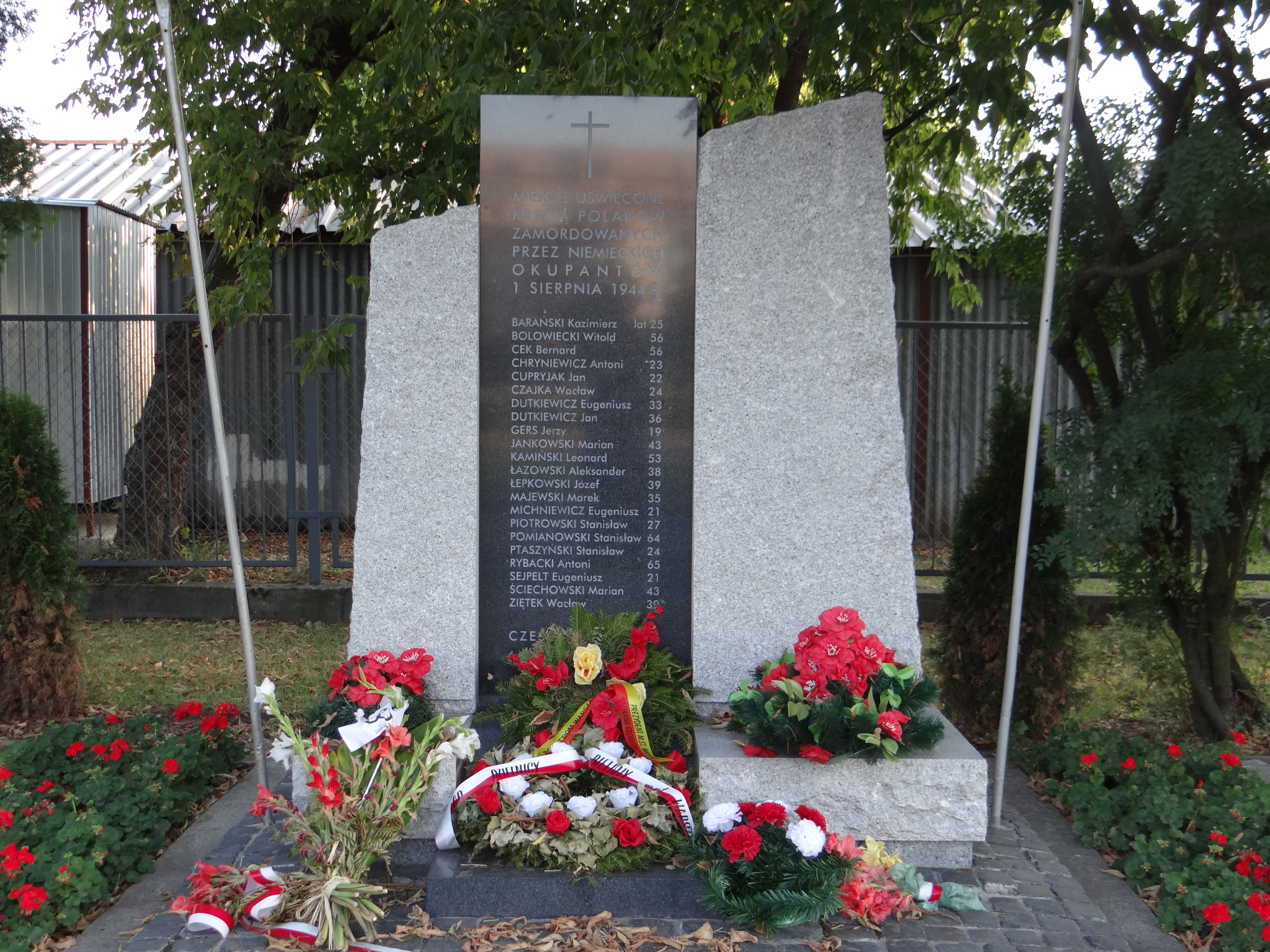
Monument commemorating victims of the execution

The execution at Powązkowska Street - a mass murder of 22 Warsaw residents of Powązki by the Germans on 1 August 1944. This execution, which claimed the lives of men living in a house at 41 Powązkowska Street, was one of the first German crimes committed during the suppression of the Warsaw Uprising.

== Prelude ==
On August 1, 1944, Powązki, like the rest of Warsaw, took part in the Uprising. Nearly 120 members of the Home Army Group "Żyrafa" tried to attack the Bem's Fort (so called Pionierpark) occupied by the Germans. However, the attack broke down under fire of German machine guns, which nested in a nearby military cemetery. Part of the group (the unit of captain "Sławomir") was forced to hide in Powązki and in the village of Chomiczówka.

== The execution ==
After repelling the Polish attack, the Germans decided to take revenge on the civilian population. About 6 p.m. soldiers from the garrison of Bem's Fort surrounded the house at 41 Powązkowska Street, from which two hours earlier the insurgents had been firing at Germans in the opposite building (as a result of which one German officer and one soldier were killed). The residents of the house did not take part in the Uprising, moreover, they were surprised by the outbreak of the Uprising. However, the Germans drove all the civilians out of the building and then rushed them towards the fort. There, the Poles were divided into two groups - one consisting of women and children, the other of men.

After a few hours, a German officer spoke to the detainees, stating that German soldiers had been shot at from the house they lived in, as a result of which two Germans had been killed and one injured. The officer then spoke to the women and children as follows: "Your fathers, your bandit brothers, killed an officer and a German soldier, for which they will be shot." Finally, he announced that women and children would remain hostage and would be shot if the condemned to death tried to resist or escape.

Immediately after that speech, German soldiers took the men to the so-called "pond" near the Powazkowska Road, located near Bem's Fort and St. Joseph's Church. It was about 10:30 p.m. On the spot two Germans were choosing one person each from the group, who was then taken away a dozen meters further and murdered with a shot in the back of their head. People who gave signs of life were killed. After the execution, the soldiers returned to the fort. Two men, Władysław Bombel and Stefan Mielczarek (both injured) managed to survive the massacre.

According to sources, 21 residents of the house at 41 Powązkowska Street (aged from 18 to 65) were murdered that night. However, the monument erected after the war shows the names of 22 victims.

== Commemoration ==
In 1960, a metal cross was placed on the scene of the crime, bearing a plaque with the names of the victims. In 2011, the memorial site was thoroughly renovated. A completely new monument with a height of 200 cm and a width of 170 cm was built in place of the cross. Its central element is a stone plaque bearing the names of the murdered.

== Bibliography ==
- Maria Bielech. Odnowione miejsce pamięci narodowej. „Nasze Bielany”. 11 (151), 2011–11.
- Adam Borkiewicz: Powstanie warszawskie. Zarys działań natury wojskowej. Warszawa: Instytut wydawniczy PAX, 1969.
- Szymon Datner, Kazimierz Leszczyński (red.): Zbrodnie okupanta w czasie powstania warszawskiego w 1944 roku (w dokumentach). Warszawa: wydawnictwo MON, 1962.
- Maja Motyl, Stanisław Rutkowski: Powstanie Warszawskie – rejestr miejsc i faktów zbrodni. Warszawa: GKBZpNP-IPN, 1994.
