= Massacre on Bracka Street, Warsaw =

1944 Nazi war crime

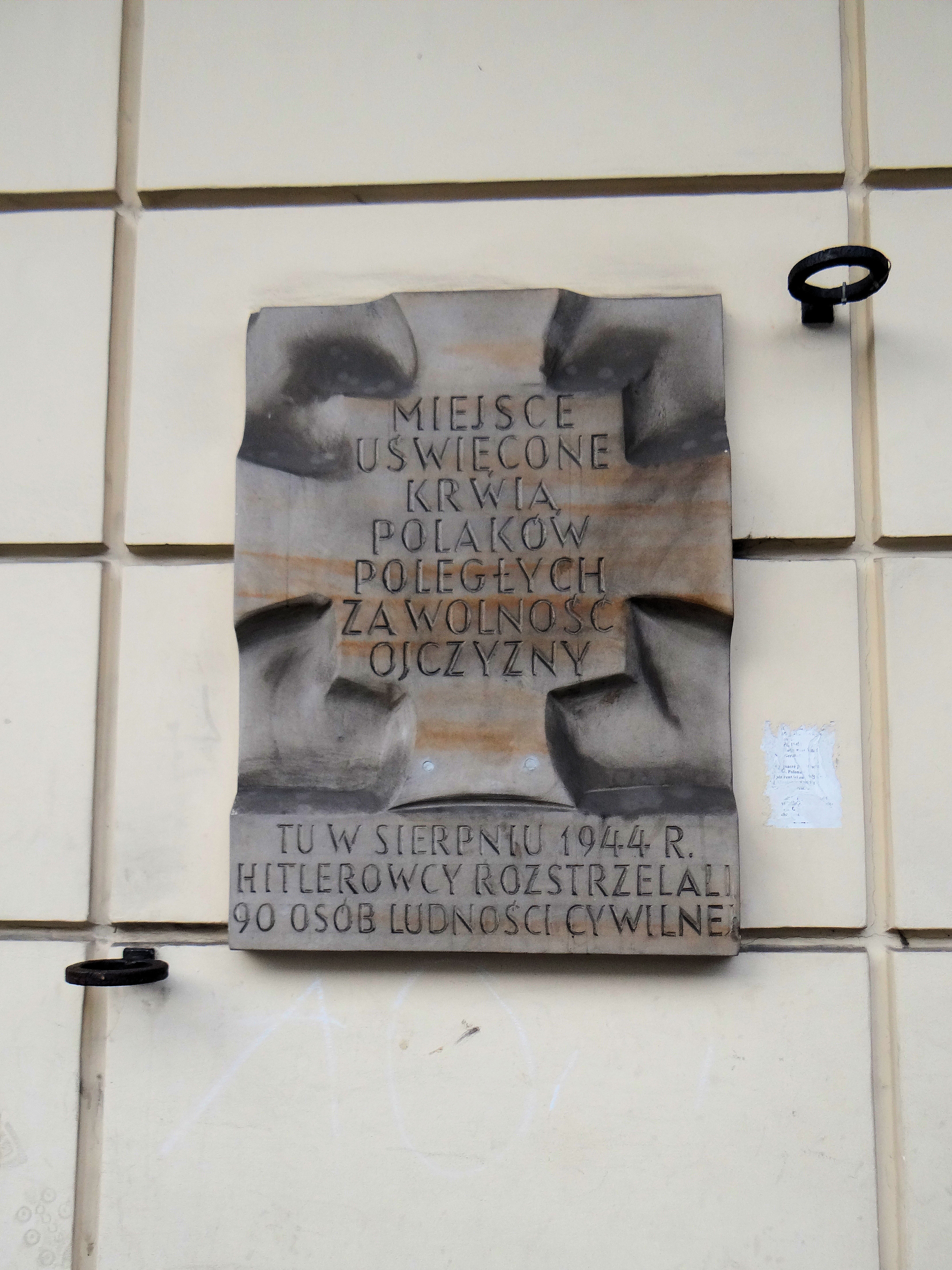
Tchorek plaque commemorating the victims of the massacre in Bracka Street.

Massacre on Bracka Street - a series of murders, arson and other serious violations of the wartime law committed by soldiers of the German Wehrmacht during attempts to unblock the section of Jerozolimskie Avenue held by the insurgents in Warsaw.

During the fights conducted on August 3–4, 1944, the soldiers of the 4th East Prussian Grenadier Regiment repeatedly used Polish civilians as "living shields", shielding the tanks' attacks on the insurgent barricades. They also committed a number of murders of prisoners of war and residents of houses on Bracka Street and Jerozolimskie Avenue. The number of victims could exceed 200.

== German attack on the Main Railway Station ==
Jerozolimskie Avenues together with the adjacent Poniatowski Bridge constituted one of the most important communication arteries in Warsaw, which allowed the Germans to provide food and supplies for their units fighting with the Red Army on the right bank of the Vistula River. On the first day of the Warsaw Uprising (1 August 1944), Home Army soldiers attacked the most important German sites on Jerozolimskie Avenue (including the Main Railway Station, the Bank Gospodarstwa Krajowego and the Poniatowski Bridge), however they failed to block this artery in any place. Only at the height of Bracka Street was it possible to establish a weak connection with Home Army units in Śródmieście Południowe (Southern Downtown). The situation changed in favour of the insurgents on August 3. That day, in the early hours of the morning, the soldiers of Chrobry II group managed to take control of the buildings of the Postal Railway Station at the crossroads of Jerozolimskie Avenue and Żelazna Street. (Note: The shock group was commanded by lieutenant Zbigniew Brym, pseudonym "Zdunin".) The same unit then conquered the so-called Tourist House, located opposite the station, where contact was established with soldiers of the "Gurt" Group, who manned the nearby building of the Military Geographical Institute. At about 10:00 a.m. soldiers of both units went to the tunnel of the Warsaw Cross-City Line, where they captured a part of a German evacuation train, acquiring a lot of weapons. Jerozolimskie Avenue and the adjacent railway line were blocked by the insurgents from that time on.

The Germans quickly started a counter-attack. Around noon, a strong armored column entered Jerozolimskie Avenue from the side of Towarowa Street, which forced its way from Wola towards Poniatowski Bridge. (Note: The column consisted of about twelve tanks, most probably belonging to the Armoured Parachute Division "Hermann Göring".) German tanks, in front of which several hundred civilians captured in Wola were being rushed as "living shields", choked the defenders of the Postal Station with fire in order to reach the area around the bridge around 1 p.m. On the other hand, around 3 p.m., from the side of Poniatowski Bridge, two battalions of the 4th East Prussian Grenadier Regiment (brought the day before from Zegrze) started to attack. German infantry supported by several tanks was attacking along 3 Maja Avenue and Jerozolimskie Avenue, trying to break through to the Main Railway Station, which was still manned by German units. In the section between Bracka Street and Nowy Świat Street, East Prussians encountered fierce resistance from Polish soldiers from the 3rd company of "Kilinski" Battalion and the so-called Collegium C (the even side of Jerozolimskie Avenue), KB "Sokól" Battalion and the Home Army unit "Belt". (houses on the odd side). By 7:00 p.m., the Germans managed to partially control the section of Jerozolimskie Avenue between Nowy Świat Street and Marszałkowska Street, but they did not manage to break through to the Main Railway Station. Moreover, the Home Army soldiers managed to keep the units in houses in Jerozolimskie Avenue No. 17 and No. 21. Due to serious losses and strong resistance of the insurgents, the Germans had to stop the attack and withdraw the main regiment forces to the area of the National Museum building. All they left were cover units in burned out houses No. 19 and No. 25.

On August 4, Jerozolimskie Avenue once again became an arena of fierce fights. In the morning, East Prussian grenadiers resumed their attack in the western direction. Then, a strong column of vehicles and infantry from the German 19th Armoured Division (from 60 to 80 tanks and cannons) broke out from the vicinity of Poniatowski Bridge to Ochota. As a result of a strong fire of the enemy, Home Army soldiers had to temporarily leave the burning Postal Railway Station. The Germans suffered serious losses (the 19th Armoured Division lost 11 dead and 40 wounded). The enemy did not make any attempt to permanently plant and secure Jerozolimskie Avenue either. The Germans maintained only the previously occupied Main Railway Station, the BGK building and the National Museum building, and also left several cover units in the ruins of houses on the section between Nowy Świat Street and Marszałkowska Street. The Home Army soldiers, on the other hand, continued to maintain their positions in the Postal Railway Station building and in building No. 17, as a result of which none of the parties could use Jerozolimskie Avenue as a communication route. It was only after many days of fighting that the insurgents managed to secure the section of Jerozolimskie Avenue between Nowy Świat Street and Marszałkowska Street, which became the only on-ground corridor connecting the Northern and Southern Downtowns (August 10–25).

== Crimes against prisoners and civilians ==
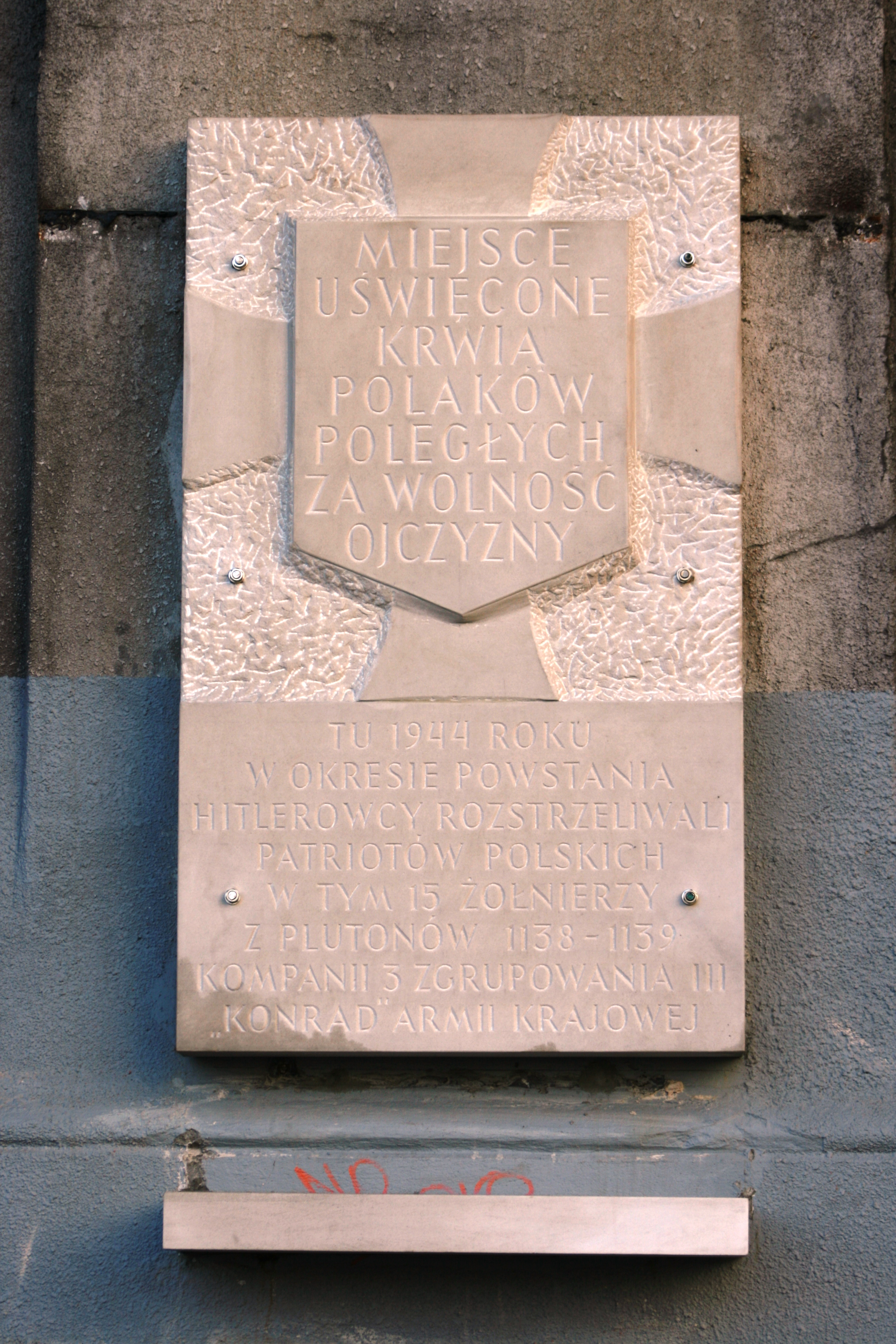
Tchorek plaque under Poniatowski Bridge commemorating murdered soldiers of 1138 and 1139 Home Army platoons.

During the fights of August 3 and 4, 1944, East Prussian grenadiers committed a number of war crimes. On the entire route of the attack, the Polish population was expelled from the houses conquered by the Germans and then rushed to the National Museum building. In the evening of August 3, more than 4000 civilians found themselves in the cellars of the building. It was not until the evening of August 4 that the Germans delivered some food to the evicted and allowed the doctors to help the injured.

Polish civilians captured in Praga and in houses at 3 Maja Avenue were used by German soldiers as "living shields", covering the attacks of tanks on the insurgents' barricades. According to the account given by the witness of these events to the editors of the insurgent magazine "The Republic of Poland" (Rzeczpospolita Polska) (no. 26 (98) of 15 August 1944), in the morning of 3 August an officer of the German armoured forces chose about 60 men from the crowd of civilians imprisoned in the basement of the National Museum. He then ordered them to form a column (5-6 people in each row), which was rushed in front of the tanks towards the insurgents' positions. At the crossroads of Bracka Street and Jerozolimskie Avenue, civilians from the "living shield" got into the crossfire and were massacred. The Germans shot or threw grenades at the hostages who fled or tried to hide from the bullets. As a result, around 50 to 60 Polish civilians died. The above-mentioned witness testified that only five men managed to return to the National Museum, including three wounded and one burnt (who died soon after).

The Germans acted in a similar way during the fights on August 4. This morning, about 100 men - civilians and a few insurgents captured in Powiśle - were taken out of the basement of the National Museum and rushed towards the insurgents' barricades. Many hostages died during the shooting or were murdered by the Germans. A few managed to escape to the area controlled by the insurgents. The hostages were also used to cover the column from the German 19th Armoured Division, which was breaking through to the west. Initially, civilians detained in the museum cellars were used again for this purpose. However, many hostages fled or died in the first phase of the attack. The Germans took several hundred civilians out of their homes at the intersection of Marszałkowska Street with Nowogrodzka Street and Jerozolimskie Avenue. They shielded the passage of the column until the crossroads of Jerozolimskie Avenue and Chałubińskiego Street, where they were then kept under guard for several hours.

On August 3–4, East Prussian Grenadiers carried out a number of executions. According to a situation report prepared by an unknown Home Army unit in the evening of August 5, 1944, the Germans murdered all the men captured in the houses at 8 and 16 Jerozolimskie Avenue and in the corner house of Nowy Świat Street - 3 Maja Avenue. A doctor helping the injured was shot at the insurgent bandage point at 16 Jerozolimskie Avenue, and the head of the sanitary section burned to death in a building set on fire by the Germans. On the other hand, "Biuletyn Informacyjny" no. 43/44 informed that the Germans were responsible for the deaths of residents of tenement houses at 17 Bracka Street and 19 Jerozolimskie Avenue (40 men and several women were to be killed in the latter house). Antoni Przygoński estimated the total number of people executed at about 100. Men who lived at the corner of Marszałkowska Street and Jerozolimskie Avenue avoided death because a silesian man, drafted into the Wehrmacht, allowed them to escape at the right time to the house occupied by the insurgents.

The insurgents who were taken captive were also murdered. One of the biggest executions took place in Powiśle, where after a failed assault on the Poniatowski Bridge several dozen poorly armed soldiers from 1138. and 1139. platoons of the 3rd Home Army Group "Konrad" were cut off in the house at 3 Maja Street No. 2. During the German counterattack on 3 August 1944 tanks broke the gate of the house, and terrified residents hung the white flag. Home Army soldiers managed to get rid of weapons and insurgent armbands, and then they mixed with a group of civilians. After taking control of the house, the Germans separated the men from the women and started the selection process. Barbara Sikora, the daughter of the housekeeper and a well-known Gestapo collaborator, actively helped them find the insurgents (she revealed that about 50 Home Army soldiers hid in the house). Volksdeutsch Koenig also participated in the selection, but he did not indicate any insurgents and even rescued several soldiers. Finally, the Germans chose 20 soldiers of " Konrad " Group from the crowd, whom they then gathered under the arch of the viaduct (the so-called cochlea). A tenant of the house managed to bribe the guards and take Zbysław Przepiórka, pseudonym "Zbyszko" out of the group of prisoners. It is probable that on the same day the remaining 19 prisoners were shot under the viaduct. The Germans took the second group of suspects, most of them hidden insurgents, to Wioślarska Street. (Note: Women and other tenants were driven to Saska Kepa and allowed to return home after some time.) Their testimonies were so consistent that the Germans decided not to execute them immediately and closed the detainees in the tower of the Poniatowski Bridge. They were kept there for almost two weeks (food and water were provided to them by the population of Saska Kępa). Around August 18–19, the prisoners were taken to the barracks at 11 Listopada Street, in Praga, where they worked for two weeks loading wagons. Later, they were taken to the transit camp in Pruszków and from there to the Stutthof concentration camp.

During the fights to unblock the Jerozolimskie Avenue, the Germans carried out a number of material damages. On the 3rd of August, they set fire to the houses at 18, 20, 22, 32, 34 and 36 Jerozolimskie Avenue, as well as to the upper floors of the tenement house at 17 Bracka Street, with petrol and gunfire from tank guns, the fire also struck fragments of the odd side of Jerozolimskie Avenue. The next day, the Germans set fire to all the tenement houses on the even side of Jerozolimskie Avenue, between Bracka Street and Nowy Świat Street. All the houses between Smolna Street and 3 Maja Avenue were also set on fire, as well as several houses in Nowy Swiat Street (in the latter the Germans were to prevent the evacuation of civilians from the burning buildings).

All crimes described above were committed with knowledge and approval of the German command. The captured soldier of the 4th East Prussian Grenadier Regiment, Walther Brunon Dolingkeit (Protestant minister in civilian life), testified that his unit had been ordered to kill all the men it had met, to remove women and children from the homes, and to burn the buildings[12]. The civilians imprisoned in the National Museum building were treated as hostages. In the evening situation report of the German 9th Army of 4 August 1944, it was stated that out of nearly 4000 Warsaw residents "women and children will be released this night, instructing them that if the fire is not interrupted by 8:00 a.m., they will be responsible for the execution of their husbands and fathers, as well as all other men, because the soldiers are unable to distinguish who is an enemy and who is a friend". In the end, this threat did not materialise. Some men (qualified as "sick") were released together with women and children. The rest were deported from Warsaw.

== Bibliography ==
- Robert Bielecki: W zasięgu PAST-y. Warszawa: Czytelnik, 1994. ISBN 83-07-01950-8.
- Adam Borkiewicz: Powstanie warszawskie. Zarys działań natury wojskowej. Warszawa: Instytut wydawniczy PAX, 1969.
- Adam de Michelis, Alicja Rudniewska: Pod rozkazami „Konrada”. Pierwsza monografia III Zgrupowania Obwodu Warszawskiego AK. Warszawa: Oficyna Wydawnicza „Volumen”, 1993. ISBN 83-85218-58-0.
- Maja Motyl, Stanisław Rutkowski: Powstanie Warszawskie – rejestr miejsc i faktów zbrodni. Warszawa: GKBZpNP-IPN, 1994.
- Antoni Przygoński: Powstanie warszawskie w sierpniu 1944 r. T. I. Warszawa: PWN, 1980. ISBN 83-01-00293-X.
- Ludność cywilna w powstaniu warszawskim. T. II i III. Warszawa: Państwowy Instytut Wydawniczy, 1974.
