= Museum of Warsaw =

Coordinates: 52°15′01″N 21°0′42″E

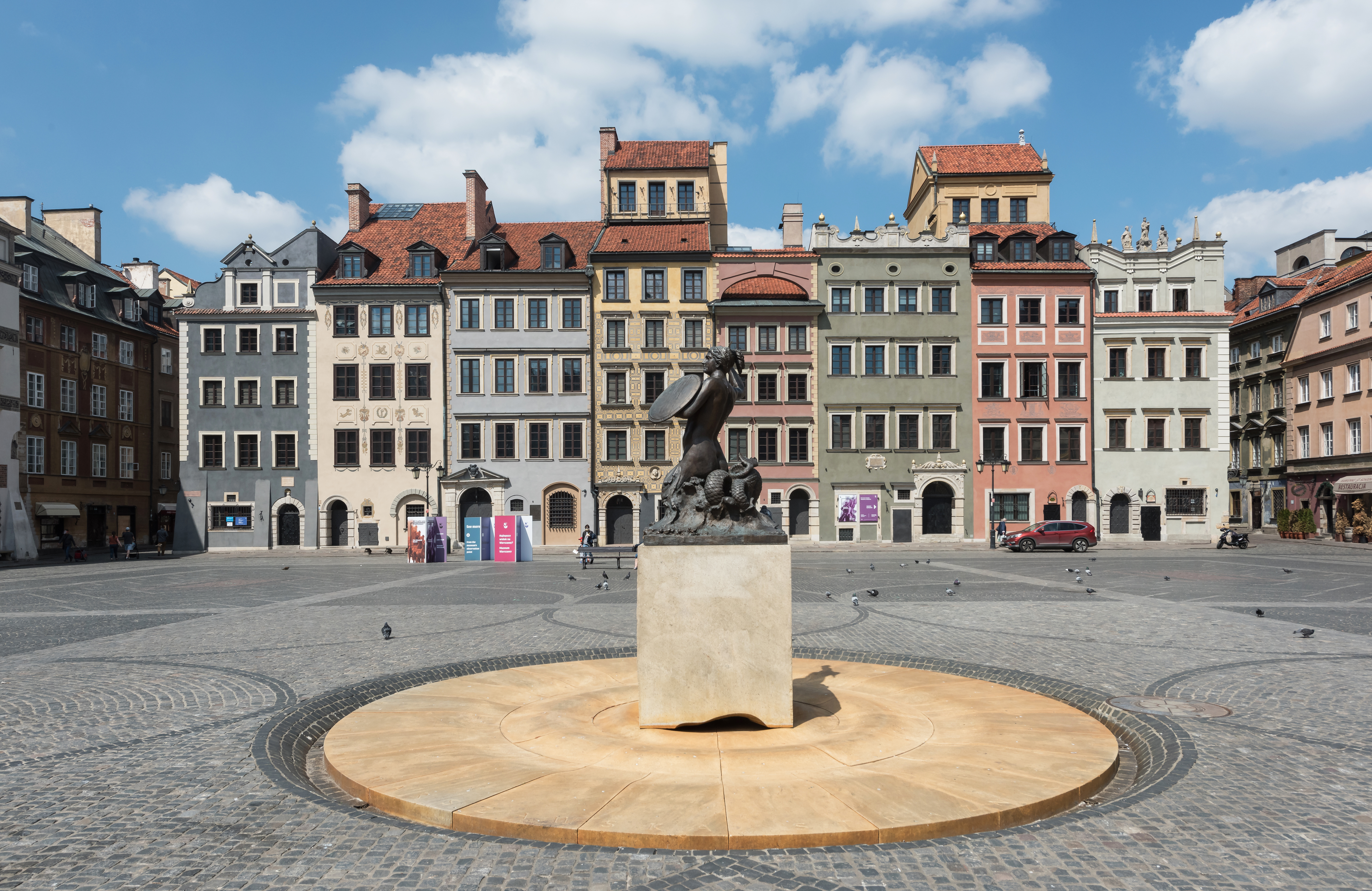
- Tenement houses on the Dekert side in the Old Town Square, the headquarters of the museum. In the foreground, a sculpture of the Mermaid, the original of which is on the permanent museum display.
- Established: 1936; 90 years ago
- Location: Rynek Starego Miasta 28/42; Warsaw, Poland
- Type: history museum
- Director: Karolina Ziębińska-Lewandowska
- Website: www.muzeumwarszawy.pl

Museum of Warsaw (Polish: Muzeum Warszawy) (in 1948–2014 Historical Museum of Warsaw, Polish: Muzeum Historyczne m.st. Warszawy) is a museum in the Old Town Market Place in Warsaw, Poland. It was established in 1936.

== History of the museum ==
The facility was established in 1936 as the Museum of Old Warsaw. It was then housed in three buildings purchased by the municipality in the market square. The museum, along with the collection, was destroyed during the Warsaw Uprising during World War II. After the war, the museum was reopened under its current name and buildings for it were rebuilt in the years 1948–1954 in the context of the unprecedented reconstruction of historic Warsaw.

In 2010-2012 the eleven houses of the museum were renovated with the help of Norwegian funding.

In April 2014 the museum changed its name to Museum of Warsaw.

== Activity ==
The various collections in the fields of archeology, painting, graphics, iconography, sculpture, decorative arts, numismatics and architectural drawings, now exceed 250,000 objects. Until the start of the renovations in 2010 there was available exhibitions showing seven centuries of Warsaw history, from its foundation to the present day.

In addition to its exhibitions, the museum has a strong record of publishing (including a Clio Award in 2010 for its series of "Library of Warsaw"), as well as numerous publications on their own collections and the history of Warsaw. They organize lessons and competitions for schools and conferences and participate in significant events such as: a Night at the Museum, the Science Picnic of Polish Radio and the Copernicus Science Centre, the Festival of Science, and the University of the Third Age. It is also a co-producer of documentary films devoted to the capital.

Revitalization of the museum was completed in 2012.

== Branches ==
The Historical Museum of Warsaw has 9 branches:

| No. | Name | Address | Picture |
|---|---|---|---|
| 1. | Antonina Leśniewska Museum of Pharmacy | ul. Piwna 31/33 | |
| 2. | Military Ordinariate of Poland | ul. Długa 13/15 | |
| 3. | Museum at the Cemetery in Palmiry | Palmiry, Gmina Czosnów | |
| 4. | Museum of Praga | ul. Targowa 50/52 | |
| 5. | Museum of Wola | ul. Srebrna 12 | |
| 6. | Janusz Korczak Research and Documentation Centre | ul. Jaktorowska 6 | |
| 7. | Warsaw Museum of Printing | ul. Trębacka 3 | |
| 8. | Warsaw's Old Town Heritage Interpretation Center | ul. Brzozowa 11/13 | |
| 9. | Museum of the Warsaw Barbican | ul. Nowomiejska | |
