= Effects of war =

Effect of war

Disability-adjusted life year for war per 100,000 inhabitants in 2004 no data less than 100 100–200 200–600 600–1000 1000–1400 1400–1800 1800–2200 2200–2600 2600–3000 3000–8000 8000–8800 more than 8800

The effects of war are widely spread and can be long-term or short-term. In the past decade, up to two million of those killed in armed conflicts were children. The trauma and suffering experienced by civilian populations are another consequence of these conflicts, contributing to emotional and psychological stress. Present-day internal wars generally take a larger toll on civilians than state wars. This is due to an increasing trend in which some combatants deliberately target civilians.

A state conflict is an armed conflict that occurs with the use of armed force between two parties, of which one is the government of a state. "The three problems posed by state conflict are the willingness of UN members, particularly the strongest member, to intervene; the structural ability of the UN to respond; and whether the traditional principles of peacekeeping should be applied to intra‐state conflict". Effects of war also include mass destruction of cities and have long lasting effects on a country's economy. Armed conflict has important indirect negative consequences on infrastructure, public health provision, and social order.

== Long term effects ==
During the Thirty Years' War in Europe, for example, the population of the German states was reduced by about 30%. The Swedish armies alone may have destroyed up to 2,000 castles, 18,000 villages and 1,500 towns in Germany, one-third of all German towns.

Based on 1860 census figures, 8% of all white American males aged 13 to 50 died in the American Civil War. Of the 60 million European soldiers who were mobilized in World War I, 8 million were killed, 7 million were permanently disabled, and 15 million were seriously injured.

Estimates for the total casualties of World War II vary, but most suggest that some 60 million people died in the war, including about 20 million soldiers and 40 million civilians. The Soviet Union lost around 27 million people during the war, about half of all World War II casualties. The largest number of civilian deaths in a single city was 1.2 million citizens dead during the 872-day Siege of Leningrad.

Children have also been directly impacted by war. Since 2011 Syria has experienced 12,000 child deaths as a result of the conflict that was initiated as an uprising against Syrian President Bashar Al Assad. In 2023, Gaza has seen over 12,000 child deaths in two months, the highest and fastest child death toll in recent history.

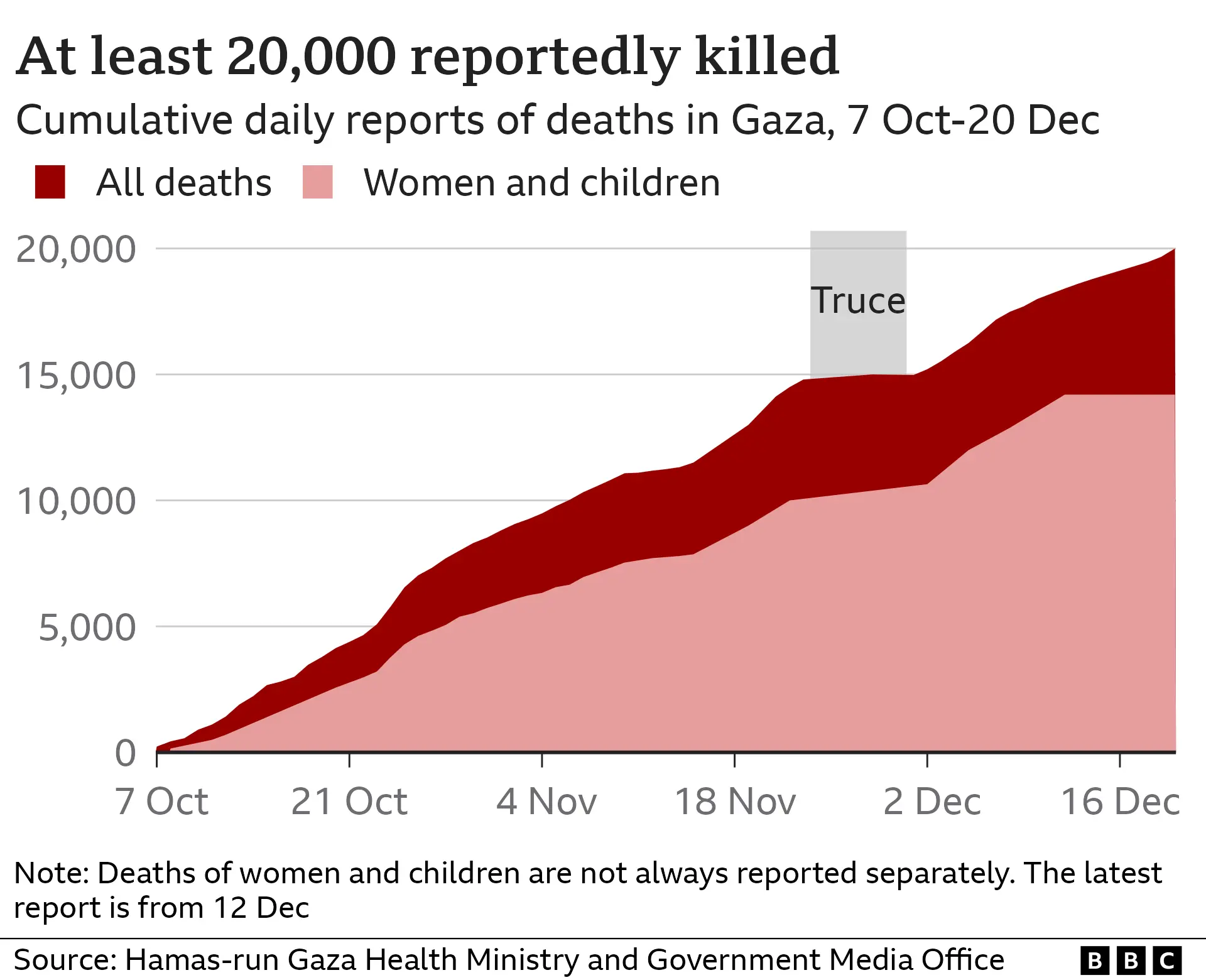
Cumulative Daily Reports of Death in Gaza Oct 7- Dec 20 in 2023.

== On the economy ==
The economy may suffer devastating impacts during and after a time of war. According to Shank, "negative unintended consequences occur either concurrently with the war or develop as residual effects afterwards thereby impeding the economy over the longer term". In 2012 the economic impact of war and violence was estimated to be eleven percent of gross world product (GWP) or 9.46 trillion dollars. Everyday activities of a community or country are disrupted and property may be damaged. When people become displaced, they cannot continue to work or keep their businesses open, causing damages to the economy of countries involved. A government may decide to direct money to fund war efforts, leaving other institutions with little or no available budget.

In some cases war has stimulated a country's economy (World War II is often credited with bringing America out of the Great Depression). According to the World Bank, in the event that conflicts subside in the country, and there is a transition to democracy, the following will result in an increase in economic growth by encouraging investment in the country and its people: schooling, economic restructuring, public-good provision, and reducing social unrest. Conflict very rarely has positive effects on an economy according to the world bank "Countries bordering conflict zones are facing tremendous budgetary pressure. The World Bank estimates that the influx of more than 630,000 Syrian refugees have cost Jordan over USD 2.5 billion a year. This amounts to 6 percent of GDP and one-fourth of government's annual revenues". One of the most commonly cited benefits for the economy is higher GDP growth. This has occurred throughout all of the conflict periods, other than in the Afghanistan and Iraq war period. Another benefit commonly mentioned is that WWII established the appropriate conditions for future growth and ended the great depression. In previous cases, such as the wars of Louis XIV, the Franco-Prussian War, and World War I, warfare serves only to damage the economy of the countries involved. For example, Russia's involvement in World War I took such a toll on the Russian economy that it almost collapsed and greatly contributed to the start of the Russian Revolution of 1917.

=== Destruction of infrastructure ===
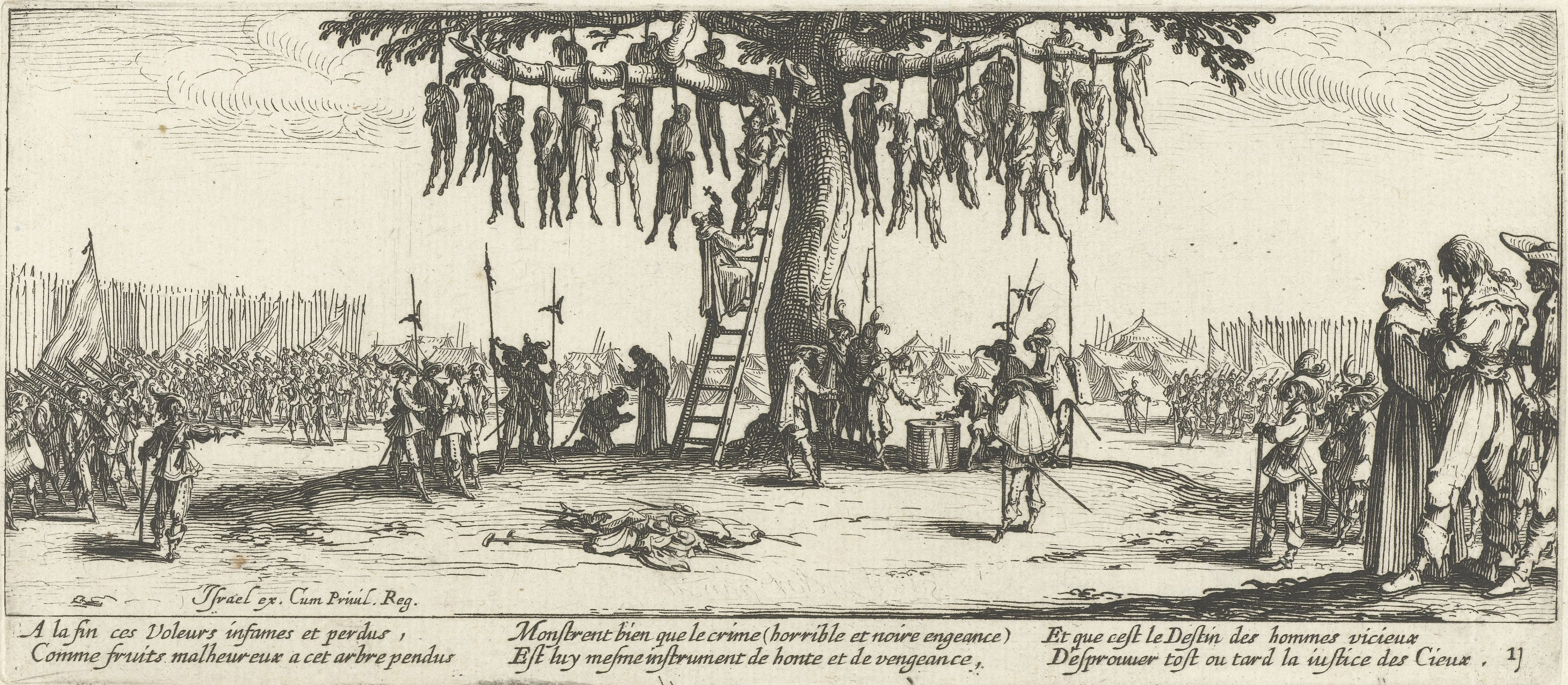
Les Grandes Misères de la guerre depict the destruction unleashed on civilians during the Thirty Years' War.

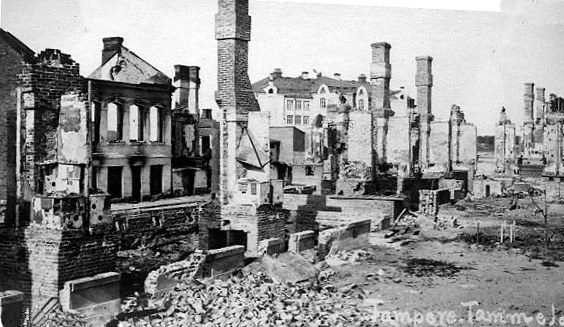
Highly destroyed city of Tampere after the Finnish Civil War in 1918.

Destruction of infrastructure can create a catastrophic collapse in the social interrelated structure, infrastructure services, education and health care system. Destruction of schools and educational infrastructure have led to a decline in education among many countries affected by war. If certain infrastructural elements are significantly damaged or destroyed, it can cause serious disruption of the other systems such as the economy. This includes loss of certain transportation routes in a city which could make it impossible for the economy to function properly. For example, warring factions often destroy bridges to separate themselves from attackers therefore creating barriers for the movement of people both in the short term (evacuation of civilians) but also in the long term, once lines of control get redrawn.

As of 2023/2024, we have seen the impacts of the destruction of infrastructure in areas such as Gaza where buildings such as UN offices, schools, hospitals, bakeries, roadways have been destroyed. All of which resulting in mass starvation of Gazans, increase in disease, reduction in education and ultimately the forced displacement of Palestinians.

=== Labor force ===
The labor force of the economy also changes with the effects of war. The labor force is affected in a multitude of ways most often due to the drastic loss of life, change in population, the labor force size shrinking due to the movement of refugees and displacement and the destruction of infrastructure which in turn allows for a deterioration of productivity.

When men head off to war, women take over the jobs they left behind. This causes an economic shift in certain countries because after the war these women usually want to keep their jobs. The shortage of labor force during the Iran–Iraq War enabled women to enter fields of employment that had previously been closed to them and absorbed them into a large number of much-needed jobs. In Women and Work in Iran, Povey points, "The Iran–Iraq war reduced the supply of male labor is one factor. The war increased the number of women seeking work or resisting exclusion. Many women even occupied important positions for the first time". This can also be seen in the Second Liberian Civil War, and in the Rwandan genocide. Women in both conflicts took over their husbands' jobs due to the effects of the war, and received more economic equality as a result.

== On society ==
"International humanitarian law (IHL), also known as the laws of war and the law of armed conflict, is the legal framework applicable to situations of armed conflict and occupation. As a set of rules and principles it aims, for humanitarian reasons, to limit the effects of armed conflict". International humanitarian law works to limit the effects of war and will protect the people who do not participate in such hostilities. Most wars have resulted in a significant loss of life. Conflict characterizes a major obstacle for the Millennium Development Goals (MDGs), particularly for the universal completion of primary education and gender equality in education. "The Millennium Development goals are the world's time-bound and quantified targets for addressing extreme poverty in its many dimensions-income poverty, hunger, disease, lack of adequate shelter, and exclusion-while promoting gender equality, education, and environmental sustainability. They are also basic human rights-the rights of each person on the planet to health, education, shelter, and security". There can be no doubt that armed conflict directly kills, injures, and harms more men than women in that combatants are predominantly male. Armed conflict has many indirect consequences such as on health and survival. "Armed conflict both generates conditions for increased morbidity and mortality".

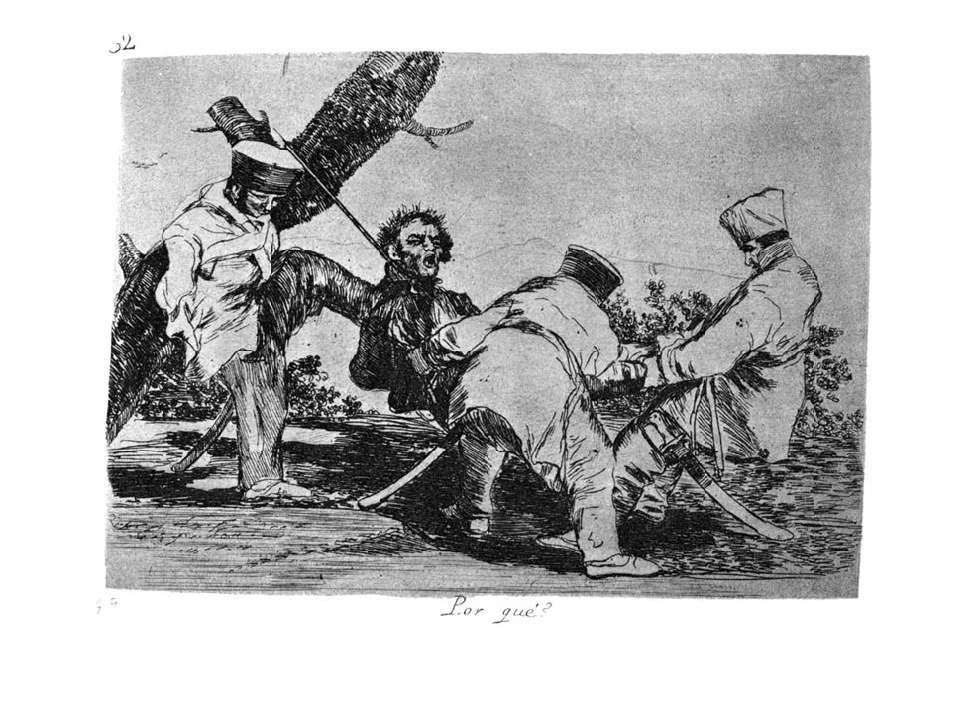
Why?, from The Disasters of War (Los desastres de la guerra), by Francisco Goya, 1812–15. A collection of depictions of the brutalities of the Napoleonic-Peninsular War.

During Napoleon's retreat from Moscow, more French soldiers died of typhus than were killed by the Russians. Felix Markham thinks that 450,000 crossed the Neman on 25 June 1812, of whom less than 40,000 recrossed in anything like a recognizable military formation. More soldiers were killed from 1500 to 1914 by typhus than from all military action during that time combined. In addition, if it were not for the modern medical advances there would be thousands more dead from disease and infection.

=== Displacement ===
Displacement or forced migration results most often during a time of war and can adversely affect both the community and an individual. When a war breaks out, many people flee their homes in fear of losing their lives and their families, and as a result, they become misplaced either internally or externally. Those who are internally displaced face a direct threat because they do not receive the rights that a refugee may receive and are not eligible for protection under an international system. Victims of internal displacements are symptoms of war that are often motivated by communal hatred based on ethnic background, race, or religious views. External displacement are individuals who are forced out of the borders of their country into another as seen with the Syrian Refugees. The following may have a severe economic impact on a country.

In 2015, 53 percent of refugees worldwide originated from Somalia, Afghanistan, and Syria. In a Global Trends Report by the UNHRC, approximately 65 million people around the world have been forced from their home. Out of this number, 21.3 million are refugees, over half of the demographic under the age of 18. Some of the top countries absorbing these displaced peoples are Pakistan (1.6 million), Lebanon (1.1 million), and Turkey (2.5 million). In times of violence, people are displaced from their homes and seek places where they are welcome, periodically meeting places they are not welcome.

In response to an influx of refugees and asylum seekers from countries such as Afghanistan, Iraq, and Sri Lanka, Australia initiated a controversial plan in 2001 titled the Pacific Solution which called for all asylum seekers arriving by boat to be sent to the small and barren island Nauru. Asylum seekers were housed in crowded tents and lived under a constant threat of running out of resources, especially water. Individuals were kept in the detention center until their refugee status was granted or denied. Chris Evans, former immigration minister stated the Pacific Solution as being "a cynical, costly and ultimately unsuccessful exercise", and was ended under a newly elected Prime Minister Kevin Rudd in 2007. In February 2008, after the Pacific Solution was ended, the final members of a group of 82 refugees detained on Nauru were granted residency rights and resettled in Australia according to a humanitarian resettlement program.

In the case of the Sri Lankan Civil War, displacement had a high chance to impoverish those affected, but women and children were found to be the most vulnerable to the burden of displacement. A Sri Lankan female head of household earns less than a household that has a male head. After men and women became displaced, however, females lost 76% of their income and males lost 80%. While the lost income is within a relatively close percentage, females were more likely, on average, to fall below the official poverty line. Male households by comparison were able to stay above the line even after becoming displaced. In a post-displacement setting, male headed households had more earned income than female headed households. Males benefit from manual labor, carpentry, masonry, and government services while females had earned their income from informal work. Informal work for females is more difficult in a post-displacement setting where they do not have access to the same tools as they did pre-displacement.

The Palestinian people have suffered from displacement as a result of armed conflict and the military occupation. The largest displacement caused due to war occurred in 1947, after the United Nations agreed to have Palestine divided into two states. It later became the Israeli decision that Palestinian refugees no longer were permitted to return to their lands unless it was to reunify a family. "Nearly one-third of the registered Palestine refugees, more than 1.5 million individuals, live in 58 recognized Palestine refugee camps in Jordan, Lebanon, the Syrian Arab Republic, the Gaza Strip and the West Bank, including East Jerusalem". As of December 2023, an estimated 1.9million Palestinians have been displaced within Gaza with no available safe zones to flee to.

=== Psychological trauma ===
Military service in combat is a risk factor for developing post-traumatic stress disorder (PTSD). Around 78% of people exposed to combat do not develop PTSD; in about 25% of military personnel who develop PTSD, its appearance is delayed.

Refugees are also at an increased risk for PTSD due to their exposure to war, hardships, and traumatic events. The rates for PTSD within refugee populations range from 4% to 86%. While the stresses of war affect everyone involved, displaced persons have been shown to be more so than others.

Challenges related to the overall psychosocial well-being of refugees are complex and individually nuanced. Refugees have reduced levels of well-being and high rates of mental distress due to past and ongoing trauma. Groups that are particularly affected and whose needs often remain unmet are women, older people and unaccompanied minors. Post-traumatic stress and depression in refugee populations also tend to affect their educational success.

The longstanding Israel-Palestinian conflict has inflicted a large amount of social and psychological suffering to those involved. Many in the Israeli Defense Forces have come forth and spoken on their mental wellbeing after committing acts of violence against the defenseless. As for Palestinians, mostly young men and children have been impacted as a consequence of this longstanding conflict.

=== Education ===
In times when a country is in an economic crisis there is an increase in poverty which results in the decline of education. Over half of the world's children that are out of school are forced to live in conflict-affected fragile states. According to the UNESCO report "The groups most negatively affected by conflict were those that suffered from multiple exclusion, for example based on gender, area of residence, household wealth, language, and ethnicity". One predominantly damaging, effect of conflict on education is the proliferation of attacks on schools with children, teachers and school buildings become the targets of violence. During times of war teachers and students often suffer from death or displacement. This prevents the opening of schools and increases teachers' absenteeism. In the case of Iraq, boys were pulled out of school to work for their families, and therefore the education gap for men and women shrank.

=== Gender ===
Conflict negatively impacts women and men, which often results in gender-specific difficulties that are not recognized or addressed by mainstream communities across the globe (Baden and Goetz, 1997). War impacts women differently as they are more likely to die from indirect causes as opposed to direct causes. "Women and girls suffered disproportionately during and after war, as existing inequalities were magnified, and social networks broke down, making them more vulnerable to sexual violence and exploitation, the Under-Secretary-General for Peacekeeping Operations". Men during war are more likely to die from direct causes such as direct violence. In many countries females are not looked upon as being equal to males. Males are seen as the dominant gender and therefore women are to be obedient to them. "Rape is seen as motivated by a universal male tendency towards indiscriminate violence against women and a generalized masculine desire to maintain a system of control over all women; a continuous process of intimidation by which all men keep all women in a state of fear" (Alison, 2009) The Beijing Declaration and Platform for Action named women and armed conflict as one of the most critical areas of concern. It stated that peace is directly linked to equality between men and women and to development post conflict (Beijing Platform for Action). Plumper found that most women live longer when they are in peacetime, when compared to a state that is in armed conflict the gender gap of life expectancy drastically decreases in the male to female ratio.

The indirect effects of militarized conflicts' affect access to food, hygiene, health services, and clean water. Women suffer more harshly from the damage to the health as well as overall well-being, other infrastructure damages, and the wider economic damage as well as from dislocation during and post-conflict. During a time of war women are often separated from their husbands or lose them as a cost of war. Because of this, there is a dramatic economic cost effect on women causing many to bear the entire economic responsibility for their household.

There are many effects of war on women – emotionally, socially and physically. One effect can be the disruption of the family unit due to males entering the military during a conflict. This military enrollment has both an emotional and social effect on the women left behind. Because of that enrollment, women can be forced into roles that they are not used to – entering the workforce, providing for their families, and taking on other traditional male roles. Rape of women and girls was mentioned above and can have both physical and emotional effects. Unfortunately, there has been lack of accurate data on the number of rape victims. There are a few reasons for this – women are afraid to report the rape due to fear of retaliation or how they may be viewed by society, while others may falsely report rape for increases in government support and services.

Lastly, women might not report rape because of the lack of prosecution and actual convictions of the attackers. Prosecution can become difficult due to the lack of evidence and the political justice system itself. The film "The Prosecutors" highlighted how hard it is to prosecute wartime criminals and the danger that the victims and the prosecutors are in when facing them. The film focuses on three countries – The Democratic Republic of Congo, Columbia, and Bosnia and Herzegovina, the sexual war crimes committed, and how difficult the prosecution process is in those countries.

Three of the most common things done by Israeli military occupation includes the apartheid wall, displacement of people, and house demolitions caused by bombings especially in Gaza. This has severe consequences on men and women. As the number of marital disputes rises after a house demolition, women are forced to look for work in order to support the livelihood of their families. Also, there is a large rise in domestic violence that leaves women more vulnerable. Palestinians, particularly women, are unable to access basic services, resulting in everyday abuse and suffering as they pass through Israeli checkpoints in order to have such access and admittance.

=== Environment ===
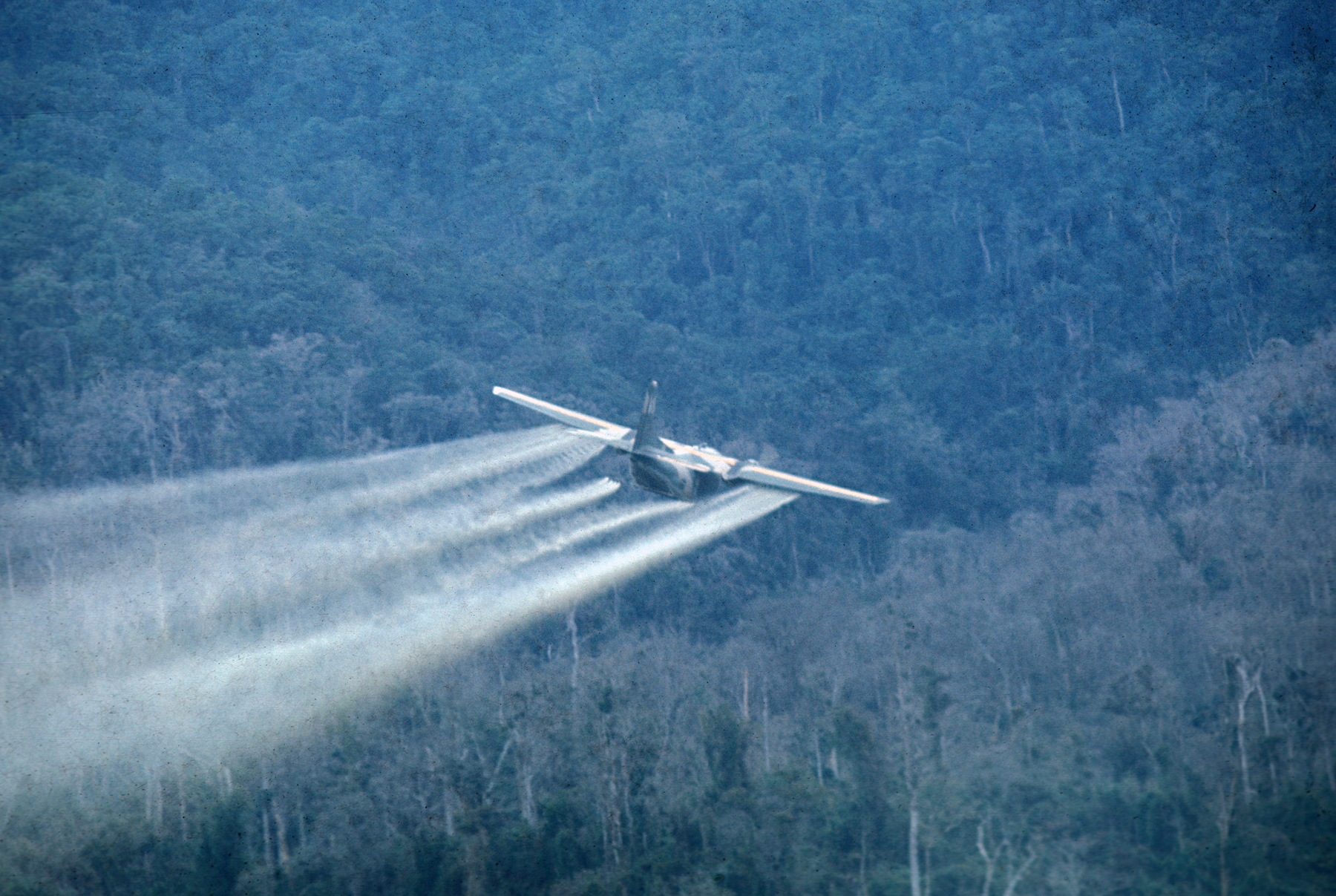
USAF C-123 Provider spraying Agent Orange onto Vietnam forests in the 1960s

War contributes to environmental degradation in two main ways. The first is direct effects of killing off native biota, the second is indirect effects of depriving species of resources needed to survive or even their entire habitat. For humans, the use of depleted uranium (DU) by the United States military during the Persian Gulf War drew claims that the deposited DU was the cause of a cancer cluster in Iraq’s southern regions. Furthermore, due to the United States government’s authorization of the toxic defoliant Agent Orange during the Vietnam War, it is estimated by the Vietnamese government that 400,000 Vietnamese were either killed or maimed by it, 200,000 suffering from cancer, and 500,000 born with related birth defects.

=== Cultural property ===
During a war, cultural assets are threatened with destruction, confiscation, looting and robbery. Cultural heritage can be archaeological finds, excavation sites, archives, libraries, museums and monuments that are sometimes simply vandalized or stolen by warring parties in order to finance the war. During the Second World War in particular, Nazi Germany also stole art objects in large parts of Europe. And even if there are international legal regulations, they are often not complied with. In addition to the human suffering caused by war and armed conflict, around three quarters of all man-made cultural assets and thus the testimonies and evidence of human creativity were destroyed in this way. In contrast, only about a quarter of all cultural assets have been destroyed by natural disasters or have permanently disappeared due to normal deterioration. According to Karl von Habsburg, founding president of Blue Shield International, the destruction of cultural goods is also part of psychological warfare, because the target of the attack is the identity of the opponent, which is why symbolic cultural goods become a main target.

== Politically ==
When war strikes it ends up affecting government structures along with the people in power of the government. Many times, one regime is removed and new forms of government are put into place. This can be seen in the Second Liberian Civil War where rebels had removed the current leader, Charles Taylor, and with the help of the United Nations deployed a new democratic form of government that stands for equal rights and even had a woman president in Ellen Johnson Sirleaf. These changes in government also changes the way the country behaves economically.

Some scholars, however, have argued that war can have a positive effect on political development.

=== On state formation ===
Political scientist Jeffrey Herbst argues that interstate war is a requisite factor in the formation of strong states. Using Europe's history of state formation as his model, Herbst identifies interstate war as the factor that enabled states to effectively collect revenue and to generate a spirit of nationalism, two results that Herbst considers "crucial developments" in the formation of strong states. War increases both a leader's incentive to establish an efficient system of taxation and the population's willingness to assent to higher taxes. The existence of an external threat is also a powerful impetus for the development of a cooperative or unified state. Because the system of revenue collection, increased rate of taxation, and spirit of nationalism generally persist after war ends, war can have long-term consequences on a state's formation. This is particularly true of states in regions or periods of consistent warfare because states generally either adapted or were conquered. Herbst postulates that the stability of borders and lack of credible external threats between African states could result in "a new brand of states", those that will "remain permanently weak".

Charles Tilly, an American sociologist, political scientist, and historian, claims that within the context of European history, "war makes states". While the purposes of war were to expand territory and to check or overcome neighboring states, the process of war inadvertently engendered European-style state-building. War making resulted in state making in four ways:

1. War making that culminated in the elimination of local rivals gave rise to one centralized, coercive strong state power that had a large-scale monopoly on violence.
2. Eventually, this large-scale monopoly on violence held by the state was extended to serve the state's clients or supporters. This encouraged pacification, led to the formation of police forces, and provided protection as a state service.
3. War making and military expansion would not be possible without extracting resources from the population and accumulating capital. Historically, this led to the establishment of fiscal and accounting institutions to collect taxes from the population to fuel war.
4. Finally, courts of law, guarantees of rights, and representative institutions were demanded for by the state's populations whose resistance to war making and state making led to concessions being made by the state. This enabled the population to protect their individual property without allowing them to use force, which would compromise the state's monopoly on violence.

War making and the extraction, protection, and state making that followed were interdependent. Tilly ultimately argues that the interactions between these four processes influenced the classic European state making experience.

=== On world state formation ===
Since the late 19th century, scholars began supposing that war will eventually lead to world state formation. Kang Youwei in 1885 and George Vacher de Lapouge in 1899 expected world wars and unification of the world under a victorious power. Written during the First World War, The World Set Free of Herbert Wells portrayed a war fought with “atomic bombs.” The survivors formed a world state to put an end to “incurably war-making” states. Oswald Spengler in The Decline of the West predicted the establishment of world government by a victorious race within two generations (from 1922).

During the Second World War, some political scientists concluded the final war has come and would end with the world state. Now, wrote Derwent Whittlesey, consolidation has begun. For Robert Strausz-Hupé there could be no end to war until one state had subjected all others and achieved world state. He did not doubt that this is the logical final stage in the geopolitical theory of evolution. John H. Herz reflected that world domination or world hegemony by a single power would be the ultimate result of the ongoing war. Ludwig Dehio supposed that the deeper meaning of the world war his generation witness is the greatest world political convergence of all time. The world state goes through birth pangs.

For the founder of the Paneuropean Union, Richard von Coudenhove-Kalergi, the American postwar air superiority would establish Pax Americana which would be an intermediate stage toward the world state. In his famous The Anatomy of Peace, Emery Reves proclaimed the last phase of the struggle for the conquest of the world. Unless we establish world government in democratic way, which is improbable due human blindness, the "iron law" of history would compel us to wage wars until world empire is finally attained through conquest. A victorious power would conquer and rule the world.

The advent of the nuclear age did not have an immediate overwhelming impact. Reves added a postscript to his Anatomy of Peace published a few weeks before the bombing of Hiroshima where he noted that the new physical fact changes nothing in the political situation. The next war would form the world state. Albert Einstein, Bertrand Russell, Georgy Fedotov, and Reinhold Niebuhr believed that, unless world government is established by agreement, an imperial world state would come by war or wars, and the three latter were even less optimistic regarding the option of agreement.

Originally drafted as a secret study for the Office of Strategic Services (the precursor of the CIA) in 1944 and published as a book three years later, The Struggle for the World by James Burnham concludes that the introduction of atomic weapons works in the same direction and with greater magnitude. These weapons make a world state inevitable and imminent. In the first nuclear decade, Crane Brinton, Hans Morgenthau, and Arnold J. Toynbee theorized on the subject of World War III leading to world state.

The expectation of war forming world state waned during the latter half of the Cold War. The subject became considered unthinkable. Yet one professional historian, Max Ostrovsky, held the view even in the post-Cold War period. He recognized the possibility of total annihilation but also the possibility of survival and recovery, and considered the second possibility too. The five-millennia old Narmer Palette, he says, recorded the first case of state formation and its universal method. By his mace, Narmer wielded the earliest known state. The heavy mace of the Pentagon is about to form the next, and the first global, state. All the casualties of wars in history, as well as all the victims of autocracies established with the main purpose to wage wars more effectively, mean only this: by some natural laws, mankind was pre-destined to form a single world state but failed to find any way to accomplish this goal besides war.

== Defining armed conflict ==
Armed conflict is not clearly defined internationally. according to the Geneva Conventions of 1949, common article 2 states that "all cases of declared war or of any armed conflict that may arise between two or more high contracting parties, even if the state of war is not recognized, the convention shall also apply to all cases of partial or total occupation of the territory of a high contracting party even if the said occupation meets with no armed resistance". International humanitarian law works to protect the rights and dignity of civilians during peace and armed conflict with parties of the conflict having legally binding obligations concerning the rights of persons not involved in the conflict.
