= Copernicus (disambiguation) =

Nicolaus Copernicus (1473–1543) was a Renaissance polymath and astronomer.

Copernicus, Kopernik or Kopernikus may also refer to:

== Science ==
- OAO-3 Copernicus, an orbiting astronomical observatory (X-ray and UV) launched on 21 August 1972
- Copernicus Programme, a joint initiative of the European Commission and European Space Agency
- Copernicus Science Centre, Warsaw, Poland
- Kopernik Observatory & Science Center, an observatory and science center in Vestal, New York
- Copernicium, element 112
- Copernicus (star), also known as 55 Cancri A in the 55 Cancri binary star system
- Copernicus Award, a Polish-German scientific award offered jointly by the Foundation for Polish Science and Deutsche Forschungsgemeinschaft
- Erdmann Copernicus (died 1573), German scholar, not related to the astronomer

== Entertainment ==
- Copernicus (film), a 1973 Polish film
- Kopernikus, a 1979 opera by Canadian composer Claude Vivier
- Copernicus, a shuttlecraft in the Star Trek series
- Doctor Copernicus, a 1976 novel by John Banville
- Copernicus, a song on the album Octahedron by American rock band The Mars Volta
- Copernicus Publications, an academic publisher

== Other uses ==
- Copernicus (lunar crater), a crater on the Moon
- Copernicus (Martian crater)
- Copernicus (yacht), a 1973 Polish yacht
- Copernicus Cup, an annual indoor track and field competition
- Copernicus Festival, a science festival held every May
- Copernicus Foundation, a non-profit organization in Chicago
- Copernicus Peak, the highest peak of Mount Hamilton, California
- Wrocław Airport, formerly known as Wrocław Copernicus Airport, Poland
- DFS Kopernikus, German TV satellites of the 1990s
- Index Copernicus, an online database of user-contributed information
- Kopernik (organization), a non-profit headquartered in Indonesia

== See also ==
- Copernican (disambiguation)
- Copernicia, a genus of 24 species of palms
- Copernic, the company that produces Copernic Desktop Search
