= Big Problems =

Big Problems may refer to:

- Big Problems – An Advice Podcast, a podcast co-hosted by Stephen Tobolowsky
- Big Problems Big Thinkers, American television show hosted by Terre Blair
- "Big Problems", a song by Corrosion of Conformity from the album Clerks: Music from the Motion Picture
- "Big Problems", a song by DJ Kay Slay and Greg Street from the album The Champions: North Meets South
- or the List of global issues
