= Copernican federalism =

Copernican federalism is an analogy for federalism. It is named for Renaissance astronomer Nicolaus Copernicus and used to convey various viewpoints on tiers of government. It was most notably used by several American Founding Fathers, Emery Reves, and the Belgian government.

== Background ==
In 1543, Nicolaus Copernicus published De revolutionibus orbium coelestium (On the Revolutions of the Heavenly Spheres), which proposed that the sun lies in the center of the universe and all known planets, including Earth rotate around it. This heliocentric model was in sharp contrast to the geocentric model established by Aristotle and formalized Ptolemy which placed Earth at the center of the universe and was widely accepted throughout most of antiquity.

== Analogy ==
Various authors and theorists have evoked Copernican heliocentrism to describe tiers of government. Here an analogy is made between the hierarchical organization of the Solar System and governments within a nation. There are various approaches.

The most common approach describes the Sun as analogous to a federal government and the states and other administrative divisions as planets. Thomas Jefferson wrote that the U.S. states were "like the planets revolving round their common sun, acting and acted upon according to their respective weights and distances," Alexander Hamilton invoked a similar analogy in Federalist No. 9, using the word "orbit." Jefferson used the analogy to emphasize the systematic, self-balancing nature of the new United States Constitution. The analogy is also employed in an attempt to borrow Copernican simplicity as compared to Ptolemaic complexity. The implication here is that federal structures are more practicable than having many-to-many relationships.

Some theorists have used the analogy in the context of improving international relations, for example Emery Reves in The Anatomy of Peace: "Our political and social conceptions are Ptolemaic. The world in which we live is Copernican."

== Civil service reform ==
In 2000, the Belgian federal government commenced a program of civil service reform, called the “Copernicus Plan.” The object of the plan is for citizens to no longer revolve around the civil service, but for the civil service to revolve around the citizens.

== See also ==
- Copernican paradigm
- Geocentrism
- Heliocentrism
