= Copernican =

Copernican means of or pertaining to the astronomer Nicolaus Copernicus (1473–1543).

Copernican may also refer to:

== Science ==
- Copernican heliocentrism, the astronomical model developed by Copernicus
- Copernican principle, in physical cosmology
- Copernican period, in lunar geology
- Copernican Revolution, the 16th- to 17th-century intellectual revolution

== Politics ==
- Copernican federalism, a US political model
- Copernican paradigm, an Australian political model

== Music ==
- Symphony No. 2 (Górecki), a symphony by Henryk Górecki known as the Copernican Symphony, Op. 31

== See also ==
- Copernicus (disambiguation)
