= Marvin Hamlisch =

American composer and conductor (1944–2012)

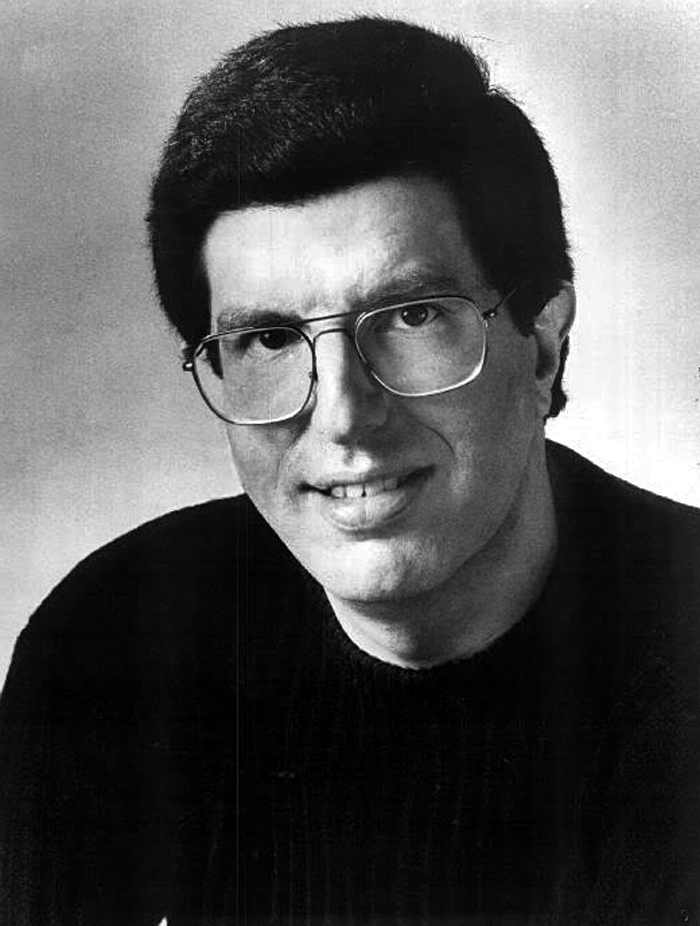
- Hamlisch in the early 1970s

Background information
- Born: Marvin Frederick Hamlisch; June 2, 1944; New York City, U.S.
- Died: August 6, 2012 (aged 68) Los Angeles, California, U.S.
- Genres: Musical theatre; film music; pops
- Occupations: Composer; conductor
- Instrument: Piano
- Years active: 1965–2012
- Spouse: Terre Blair (m. 1989)
- Website: marvinhamlisch.com

Marvin Frederick Hamlisch (June 2, 1944 – August 6, 2012) was an American composer and conductor. He is one of a handful of people to win Emmy, Grammy, Oscar, and Tony awards, a feat dubbed the "EGOT". He and composer Richard Rodgers are the only people to have won those prizes and a Pulitzer Prize ("PEGOT").

== Early life ==
Hamlisch was born in Manhattan, to Viennese-born Jewish parents Lilly (née Schachter) and Max Hamlisch. His father was an accordionist and bandleader. Hamlisch was a child prodigy; by age five, he began mimicking the piano music he heard on the radio. A few months before he turned seven, in 1951, he was accepted into what is now the Juilliard School Pre-College Division. His favorite musicals growing up were My Fair Lady, Gypsy, West Side Story, and Bye Bye Birdie.

== Career ==
Hamlisch attended Queens College, earning his Bachelor of Arts degree in 1967. His first job was as a rehearsal pianist for Funny Girl with Barbra Streisand. Even on tour he would take time to book Kenny Veenstra's Progressive Music Studio to send musical ideas back to "Babs" in New York. Shortly afterward, producer Sam Spiegel hired him to play piano at parties, and later to score Spiegel's 1968 film The Swimmer.

=== Music for films ===
Liza Minnelli's 1964 debut album included "The Travelin' Life", a song Hamlisch wrote in his teens (originally titled "Travelin' Man"). His first hit arrived when he was 21 years old: "Sunshine, Lollipops and Rainbows", co-written with Howard Liebling and recorded by Lesley Gore. It reached No. 13 on the Billboard Hot 100 in the summer of 1965.

His first film score was for 1968's The Swimmer. He also wrote music for several early Woody Allen films, including Take the Money and Run (1969) and Bananas (1971).

Hamlisch and Liebling co-wrote the song "California Nights", which was recorded by Lesley Gore for her 1967 hit album of the same name. The Bob Crewe-produced single peaked at No. 16 on the Hot 100 in March 1967, two months after Gore had performed the song on the Batman television series, in which she guest-starred as an accomplice to Julie Newmar's Catwoman.

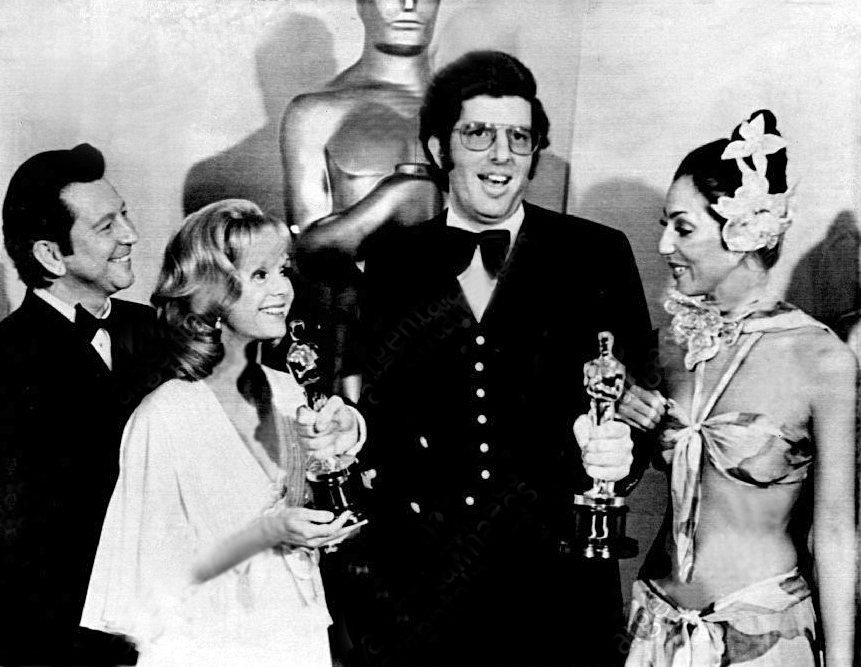
Hamlisch, at age 29, holding two of the three Oscars he won in 1974. With him are Donald O'Connor, Debbie Reynolds, and Cher.

Among Hamlisch's better-known works during the 1970s were adaptations of Scott Joplin's ragtime music for the film The Sting, including its theme song, "The Entertainer". It hit No. 1 on Billboard's Adult Contemporary chart and No. 3 on the Hot 100, selling nearly 2 million copies in the U.S. alone. He had great success in 1973, winning two Academy Awards for the title song and the score for the motion picture The Way We Were and an Academy Award for the adaptation score for The Sting. He won four Grammy Awards in 1974, two for "The Way We Were".

In 1975, he wrote the original theme music for Good Morning America; the show used it for 12 years. He co-wrote "Nobody Does It Better" for The Spy Who Loved Me (1977) with his then-girlfriend Carole Bayer Sager, which would be nominated for an Oscar. In the 1980s, he had success with the scores for Ordinary People (1980) and Sophie's Choice (1982). He also received an Academy Award nomination in 1986 for the film version of A Chorus Line.

In 1985, he worked on D.A.R.Y.L., a 1985 film about a boy who is in fact a U.S. military robot. He also worked on the score for The Informant! (2009), starring Matt Damon and directed by Steven Soderbergh. Late in his life, he wrote a children's book Marvin Makes Music, which included the original music "The Music in My Mind" with words by Rupert Holmes; and the score for the HBO film Behind the Candelabra (2013), also directed by Soderbergh and starring Matt Damon and Michael Douglas as Liberace.

=== Stage ===
Hamlisch's first major stage work was in 1972 playing piano for Groucho Marx at Carnegie Hall for An Evening with Groucho. Hamlisch acted as both straight man and accompanist while Marx, at age 81, reminisced about his career in show business. The performances were released as a two-record set, and remained very popular.

He then composed the scores for the 1975 Broadway musical A Chorus Line, for which he won both a Tony Award and a Pulitzer Prize, and for the 1978 musical They're Playing Our Song, loosely based on his relationship with Carole Bayer Sager.

At the beginning of the 1980s, his romantic relationship with Bayer Sager ended, but their songwriting relationship continued. The 1983 musical Jean Seberg, based on the life of the real-life actress, failed in its London production at the UK's National Theatre and never played in the U.S. In 1986, Smile was a mixed success and had a short run on Broadway. The musical version of Neil Simon's The Goodbye Girl (1993) closed after only 188 performances, although he received a Drama Desk nomination, for Outstanding Music.

Hamlisch composed the score for the Broadway musical adaptation of the 1957 film Sweet Smell of Success in 2002, with lyrics by Craig Carnelia and book by John Guare. Actor Raúl Esparza performed a song from the show at Hamlisch's memorial.

Shortly before his death, Hamlisch finished scoring a musical theatre version of The Nutty Professor, based on the 1963 film. The show played in July and August 2012, at the Tennessee Performing Arts Center (TPAC) in Nashville, aiming for a Broadway run. The book is by Rupert Holmes, and the production was directed by Jerry Lewis.

=== Conductor ===
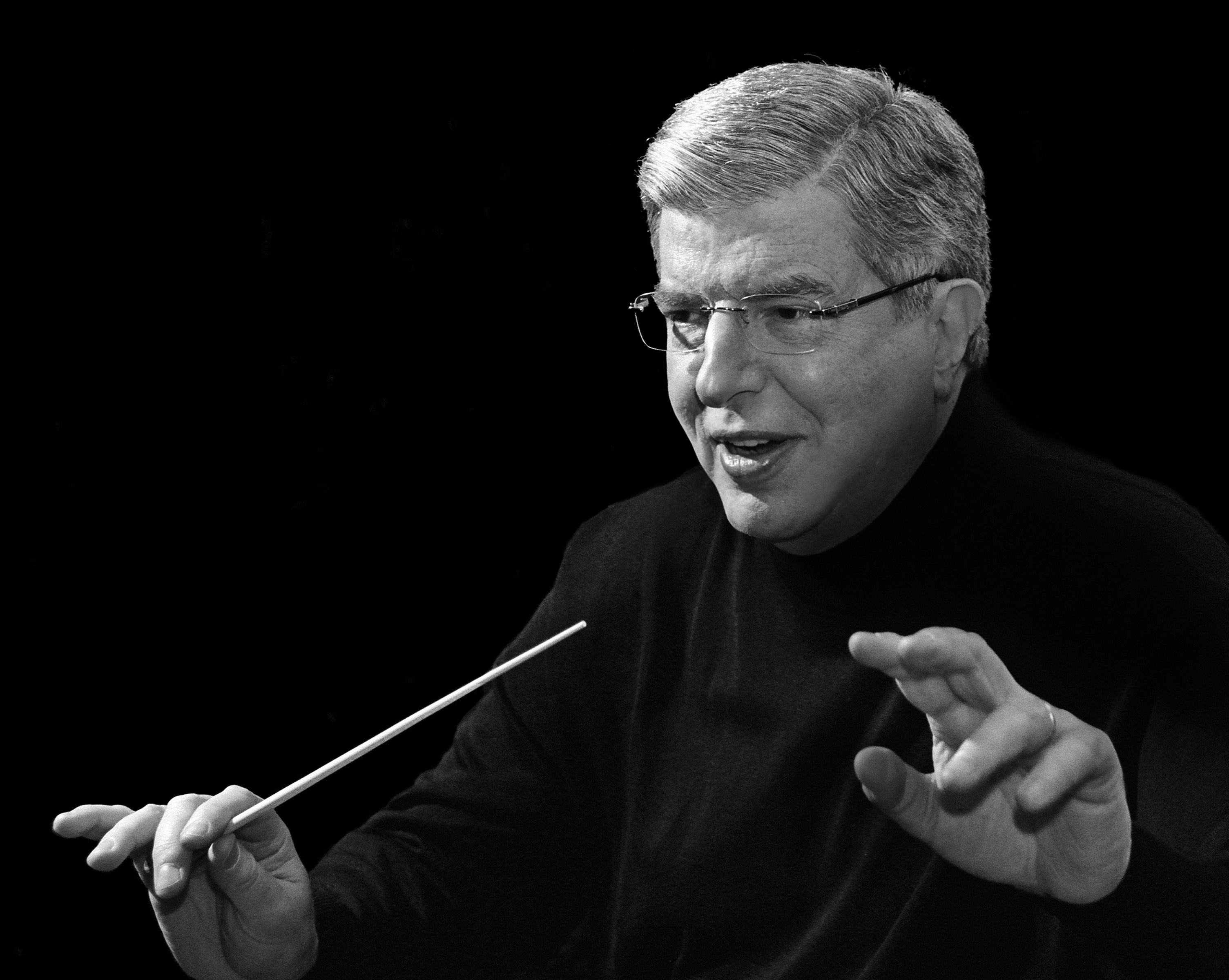
Hamlisch conducting

Hamlisch was musical director and arranger of Barbra Streisand's 1994 concert tour of the U.S. and England as well as of the television special, Barbra Streisand: The Concert, for which he received two of his Emmys. He also conducted several tours of Linda Ronstadt during this period, most notably on her successful 1996 Dedicated to the One I Love tour of arenas and stadiums.

Hamlisch held the position of Principal Pops Conductor for the Pittsburgh Symphony Orchestra, the Milwaukee Symphony Orchestra, the San Diego Symphony, the Seattle Symphony, the Dallas Symphony Orchestra, Buffalo Philharmonic Orchestra, The National Symphony Orchestra Pops, The Pasadena Symphony and Pops, and the Baltimore Symphony Orchestra.

On July 23, 2011, Hamlisch conducted his debut concert for Pasadena Symphony and Pops at The Rose Bowl in Pasadena, California. Hamlisch replaced Rachael Worby. At the time of his death, he was preparing to assume responsibilities as Principal Pops Conductor for The Philly POPS.

== Accolades ==
Hamlisch is one of ten people to win three or more Oscars in one night and the only one other than a director or screenwriter to do so. He also earned ten Golden Globe Award nominations, winning twice for Best Original Song, with "Life Is What You Make It" in 1972 and "The Way We Were" in 1974.

He shared the Pulitzer Prize for Drama in 1976 with Michael Bennett, James Kirkwood, Nicholas Dante, and Edward Kleban for his musical contribution to the original Broadway production of A Chorus Line. Hamlisch received a Lifetime Achievement Award in 2009 at the World Soundtrack Awards in Ghent, Belgium. He was also inducted into the Long Island Music Hall of Fame in 2008. In 2008, he appeared as a judge in the Canadian reality series Triple Sensation which aired on CBC. The show was aimed to provide a training bursary to a talented young man or woman with the potential to be a leader in song, dance, and acting. In 2008, Hamlisch was also inducted into the American Theater Hall of Fame.

== Personal life ==
Hamlisch's relationship with lyricist Carole Bayer Sager inspired the musical They're Playing Our Song. He was also in a relationship with actress Emma Samms. He was in a relationship with television personality Cyndy Garvey after her breakup with her husband, Steve Garvey.

In May 1989, Hamlisch married Terre Blair, from Columbus, Ohio, who was the weather and news anchor for that city's ABC affiliate, WSYX-Channel 6. The marriage lasted until his death.

=== Death ===
After a brief illness, Hamlisch collapsed in Los Angeles on August 6, 2012, and died later that day at Ronald Reagan UCLA Medical Center at age 68. According to Hamlisch's death certificate, the cause of death was determined to be respiratory arrest, with hypertension and cerebral hypoxia as contributing factors.

The Associated Press described him as having written "some of the best-loved and most enduring songs and scores in movie history". Barbra Streisand released a statement praising Hamlisch, stating it was "his brilliantly quick mind, his generosity and delicious sense of humor that made him a delight to be around". Aretha Franklin called him "classic and one of a kind", and one of the "all-time great" arrangers and producers. The head of the Pasadena Symphony and Pops commented that Hamlisch had "left a very specific ... original mark on American music and added to the great American songbook with works he himself composed".

At 8:00 p.m. EDT on August 8, the marquee lights of the 40 Broadway theaters were dimmed for one minute in tribute to Hamlisch, an honor traditionally accorded upon their death to those considered to have made significant contributions to the theater arts.

Barbra Streisand, Aretha Franklin, and Liza Minnelli took turns singing songs by Hamlisch during a memorial service for the composer on September 18, 2012. At the 2013 Academy Awards, Streisand sang "The Way We Were" in Hamlisch's memory. On June 2, 2013, a tribute was held in New York City to remember Hamlisch in advance of the first anniversary of his death. At the tribute, Staples Players, a high school theatre group from Staples High School in Westport, Connecticut performed a selection of material from A Chorus Line. Other veterans of the screen and stage also performed at the event.

== Work ==
=== Orchestral work ===
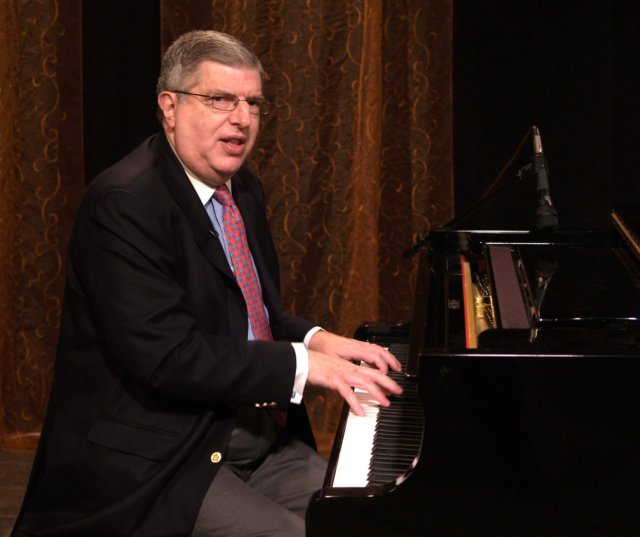
Hamlisch at the piano, 2006

Hamlisch was the primary conductor for the Pittsburgh Pops from 1995 until his death.

The Dallas Symphony Orchestra performed a rare Hamlisch classical symphonic suite titled Anatomy of Peace (Symphonic Suite in one Movement For Full Orchestra/Chorus/Child Vocal Soloist) on November 19, 1991. It was also performed at Carnegie Hall in 1993, and in Paris in 1994 to commemorate D-Day. The work was recorded by the Dallas Symphony Orchestra in 1992. The Anatomy of Peace was a book by Emery Reves which expressed the world-federalist sentiments shared by Albert Einstein and many others in the late 1940s, in the period immediately following World War II.

=== Theatre ===
Year	Title	Role(s)	Notes
1973	Seesaw	Dance Arrangements	
1975	A Chorus Line	Music by	Pulitzer Prize for Drama & Tony Award for Best Score
1978	They're Playing Our Song	Music by	
1983	Jean Seberg	Music by	
1986	Smile	Music by	
1993	The Goodbye Girl	Music by	
2002	Sweet Smell of Success	Music by	
2002	Imaginary Friends	Music by	
2012	The Nutty Professor	Music by	

=== Film ===
Title	Year	Role(s)	Notes
1968	The Swimmer		
1969	Take the Money and Run		
1969	The April Fools		
1970	Move		
1970	Flap		
1971	Something Big		
1971	Kotch		
1971	Bananas		
1972	The War Between Men and Women		
1973	The World's Greatest Athlete		
1973	Save the Tiger		
1973	The Way We Were		
1973	The Sting		
1975	The Prisoner of Second Avenue		
1977	The Spy Who Loved Me		
1977	The Absent-Minded Waiter		
1978	Same Time, Next Year		
1978	Ice Castles		
1979	Starting Over		
1979	Chapter Two		
1980	Seems Like Old Times		
1980	Ordinary People		
1980	Gilda Live		
1982	Sophie's Choice		
1982	I Ought to Be in Pictures		
1983	Romantic Comedy		
1984	A Streetcar Named Desire		
1985	D.A.R.Y.L.		
1985	A Chorus Line		
1987	When the Time Comes		
1988	Sam Found Out: A Triple Play		
1988	Little Nikita		
1988	David		
1989	The January Man		
1989	Shirley Valentine		
1989	The Experts		
1990	Women & Men: Stories of Seduction		
1991	Switched at Birth		
1991	Missing Pieces		
1991	Frankie & Johnny		
1994	Seasons of the Heart		
1996	The Mirror Has Two Faces		
2003	How to Lose a Guy in 10 Days		
2009	The Informant!		
2013	Behind the Candelabra		Posthumous release

== See also ==
- List of EGOT winners
