= Sikorski Palace =

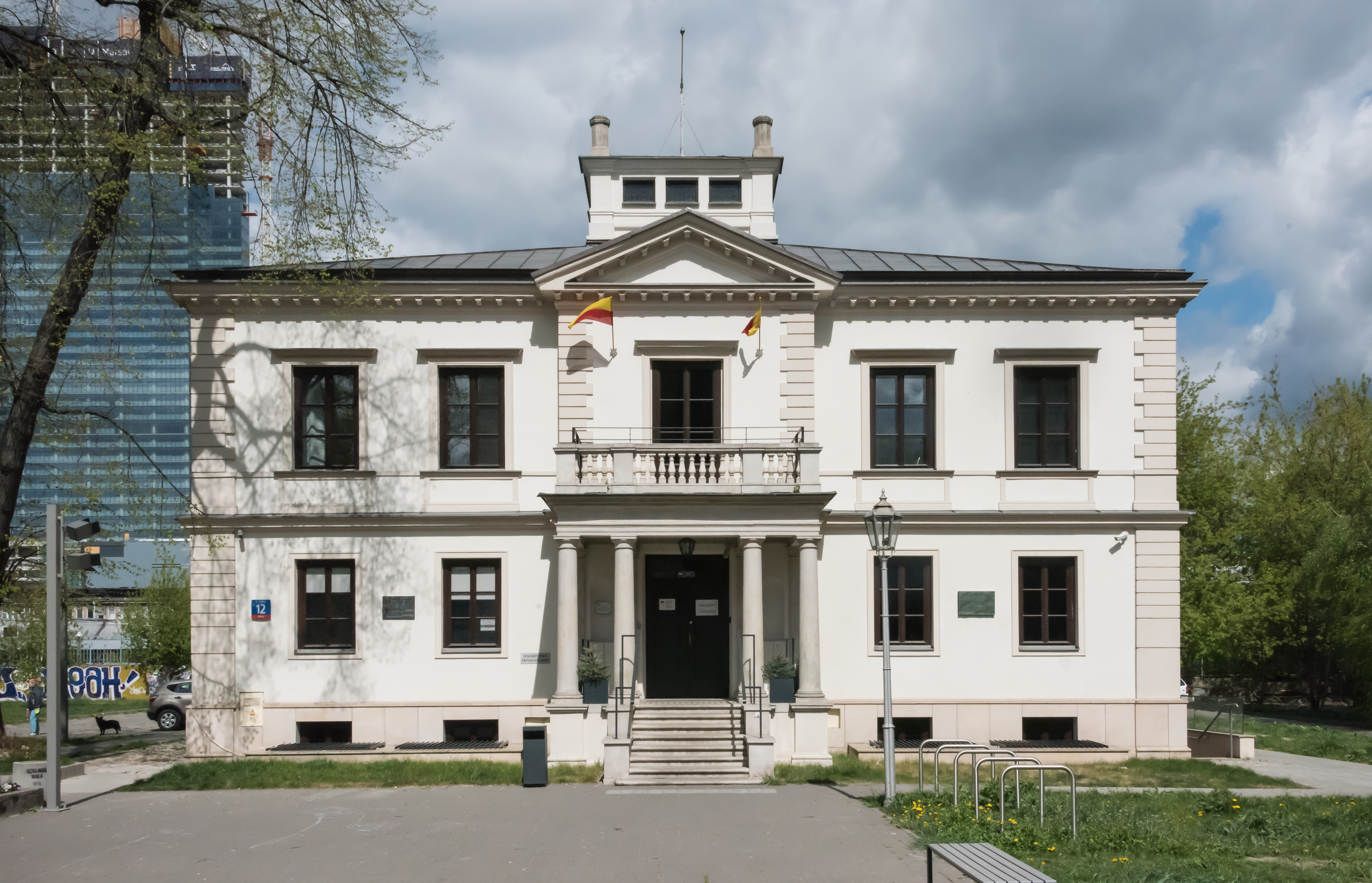
- Sikorski Palace

- Location of Sikorski Palace in Poland
- 52°13′40″N 20°59′23″E
- Location: Warsaw, Masovian Voivodeship; in Poland

History
- Built: 1880

Site notes
- Architectural style: Renaissance Revival

The Sikorski Palace (Polish: Pałacyk Sikorskiego) is a historical building located on ulica Srebrna (Silver Street) in Warsaw, Poland.

In 1877 the property was purchased by sculptor Aleksander Sikorski. In 1880 he built the palace, next to it locating his stonemason's workshop. Sikorski died the following year, and his children sold the palace to a nearby stonemason. In 1895 Maurycy Borman bought the property, and between 1905 and 1929 it was owned by his wife Cecylia.

Since 1937 the palace has been property of the State Treasury. In 1973 it was rebuilt to a design by Zygmunt Łuszczyński. Ever since, the palace has housed the Wola Museum, now a subdivision of the Museum of Warsaw.

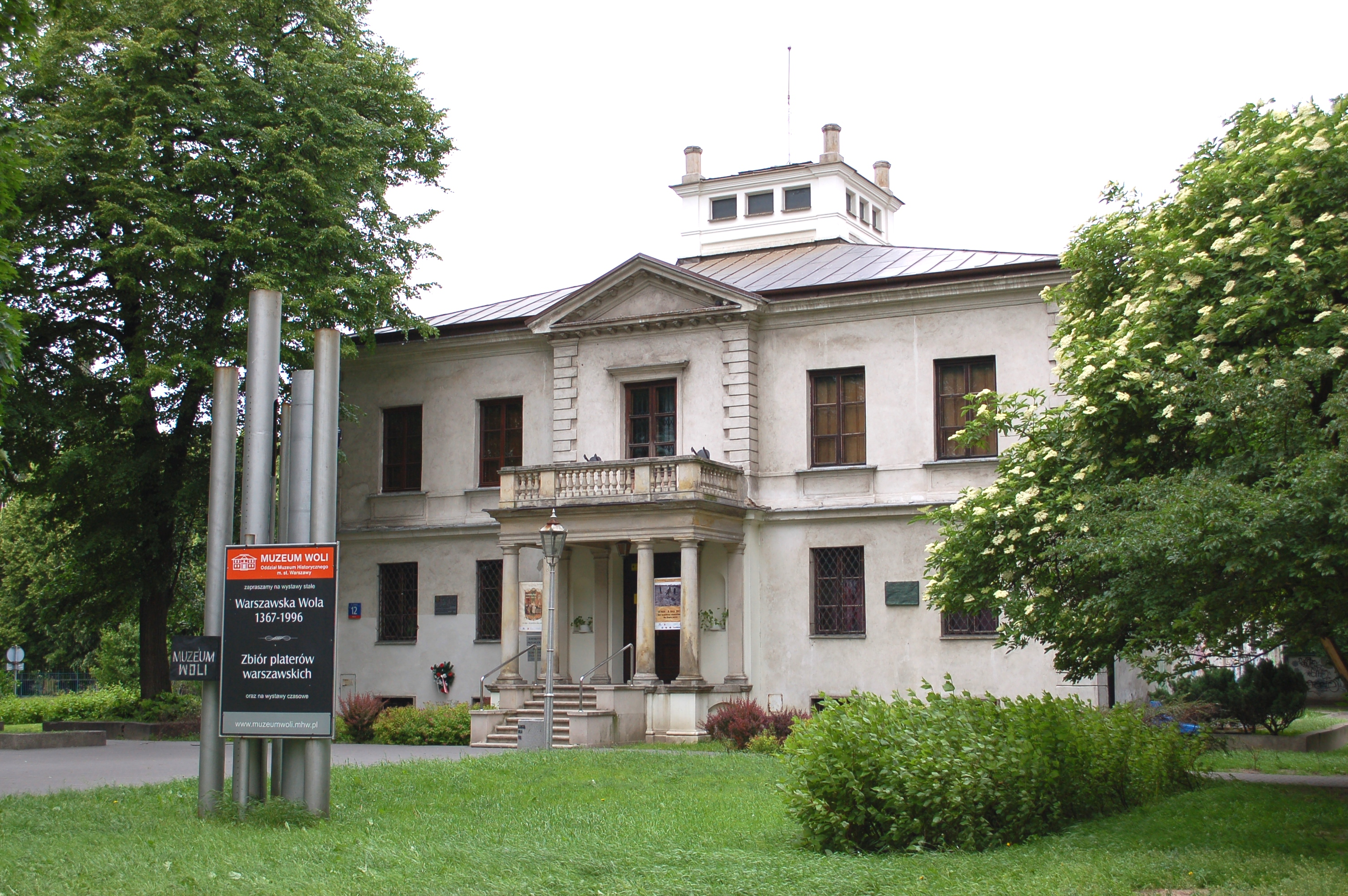
Façade of Sikorski Palace

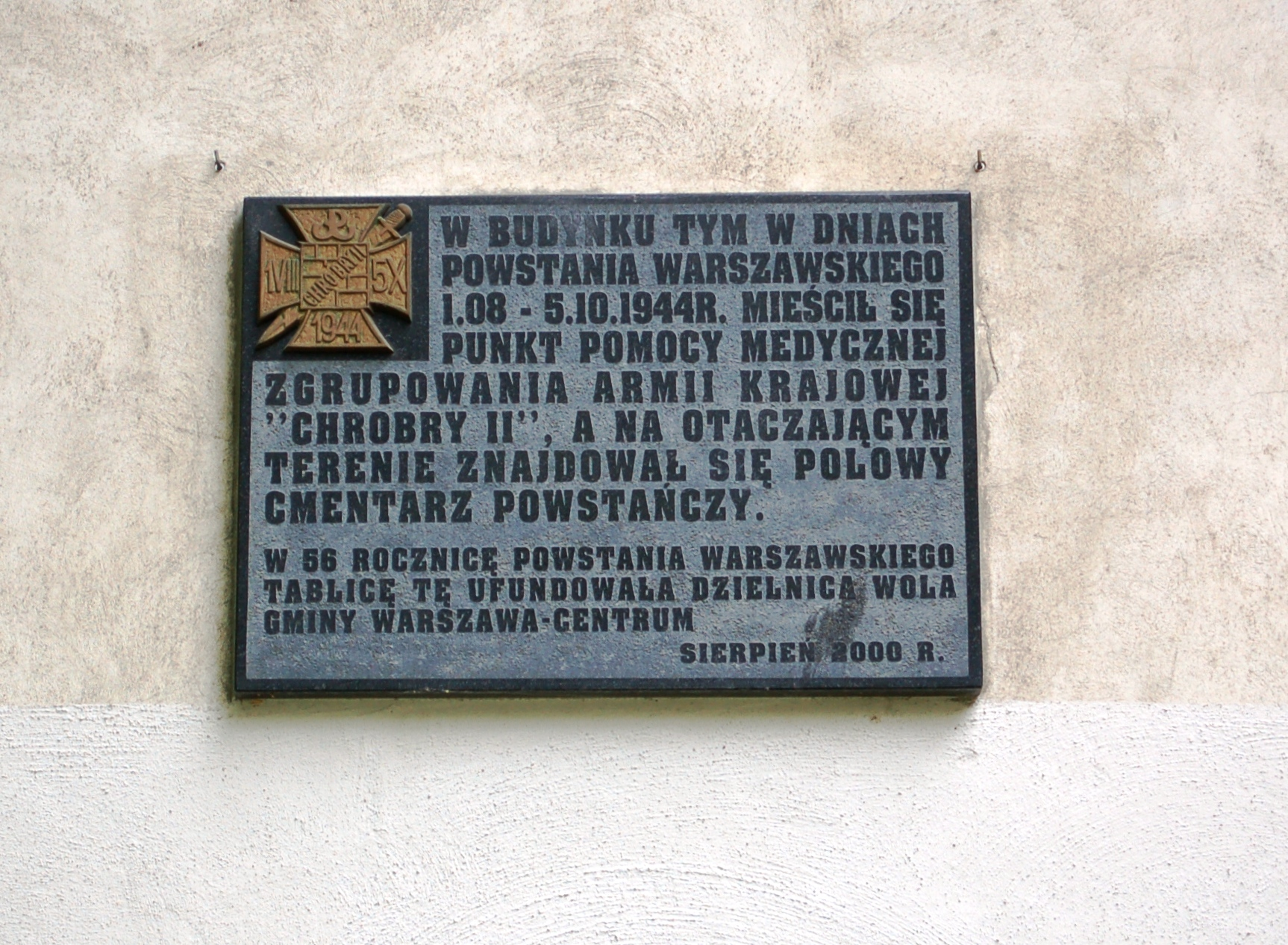
Plaque commemorating the building's importance during the Warsaw Uprising
