= Terre Blair =

American journalist and producer

Terre Blair is a journalist and producer, having worked for television networks ABC, NBC, CBS and PBS. She was married to composer Marvin Hamlisch from 1989 until his death in 2012. She is most notable for her work and creative direction as the on-air host, interviewer, and producer of the television series "Big Problems Big Thinkers", which is broadcast on Bloomberg TV.

== Education and career ==
Blair is from Columbus, Ohio, and a graduate of Otterbein College. She also attended Ohio State University as a post-graduate. As a young woman, Blair competed in beauty contests, and earned national recognition as Miss Columbus USA.

Blair is a former correspondent and producer for The TODAY Show and PM Magazine, as well as ABC Wide World of Sports, and Monday Night Football The New York Times headlined her as a female reporter who "breaks a pattern."

She was an on-air host, interviewer, producer and creative director of the television series, “Big Problems Big Thinkers” which was broadcast on Bloomberg TV. It was "the first television show to premiere a full episode on a Times Square billboard using closed captioning at the same time the live TV show is airing."
