= Kopernik (organization) =

Indonesian research and development organisation

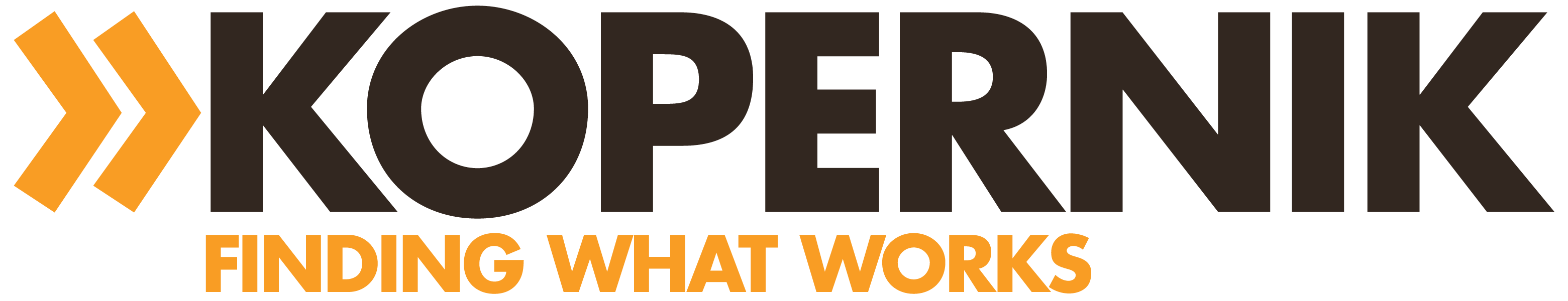
- Formation: 2010
- Founder: Toshihiro Nakamura, Ewa Wojkowska
- Type: Non-governmental organization
- Headquarters: Bali, Indonesia
- Location: Ubud, Indonesia
- Region served: Indonesia, Southeast Asia
- Website: www.kopernik.info

Kopernik (Finding What Works) is an Indonesian research and development organisation working on social and environmental challenges. Founded in 2010 and headquartered in Bali, Kopernik operates through a lean R&D cycle: identifying unmet needs through field research, testing potential solutions through rapid low-cost experiments, amplifying what works through spin-offs, open publication of findings and advisory services. Kopernik has supported more than 2.5 million people and 2,795 micro and small enterprises since founding. Active thematic areas include climate and environment, food systems and agriculture, water and sanitation, women's economic empowerment, health and education. Kopernik provides R&D advisory and consulting services to bilateral development agencies, foundations, international organisations and the private sector across the Asia-Pacific. Several spin-offs have emerged from Kopernik experiments, including MagiFarm, Perfect Fit, Loka Inspirasi and Sobean.

== History ==
Kopernik was founded in 2010 by Ewa Wojkowska and Toshi Nakamura in Bali, Indonesia.

Both had worked for the United Nations – Nakamura in Timor-Leste, Indonesia, Sierra Leone and the US and Wojkowska in Timor-Leste, Indonesia, Sierra Leone, Thailand and New York.

The organization is named for the astronomer Mikołaj Kopernik.

Nakamura and Wojkowska drew on more than 15 years working in international development and humanitarian response across Africa and Asia. The founders set out to address a recurring problem in development practice: large scale projects were routinely implemented without being properly tested in real conditions. Kopernik was designed as an agile R&D laboratory — testing practical ideas with communities, rapidly iterating, sharing results openly including failures, and enabling adoption by others.

Early work focused on technology distribution, connecting underserved communities with affordable technologies including clean-energy products and water purification devices. The model evolved toward lean experimentation as its core methodology, eventually spanning six thematic areas: climate and environment, food systems and agriculture, water and sanitation, women's economic empowerment, health, and education.

Kopernik developed a spin-off model as a defining feature of its approach: when an experiment produced results strong enough to operate independently, Kopernik would build the initiative toward independence as a separate organisation, nonprofit or for-profit. The Next CEO Program provides leadership pathways for Kopernik staff to lead these ventures.

In 2022, Kopernik co-produced Pulau Plastik, a feature documentary about plastic pollution in Indonesia.

== Programs ==
Examples of Kopernik's work include:

- Solutions Lab — Kopernik's core model: rapid, low-cost field experiments. Findings are published openly, including when experiments fail. When a solution proves itself, Kopernik builds it toward independence.
- Bengkel Bumi — a repair and upcycling hub model piloted in Bali, building circular economy skills and reducing waste through community-based repair infrastructure.
- PANGAN / Hai Mnahat — a food systems program in West Timor, East Nusa Tenggara, focused on food sovereignty, women's economic participation, and connecting smallholder farmers with market access.
- Advisory and consulting services - lean R&D advisory, market research, value chain analysis, partnership brokerage, and capacity building for bilateral agencies and foundations across the Asia-Pacific.

== Recognition ==
- Ewa Wojkowska (co-founder) is an Ashoka Fellow.
- Toshihiro Nakamura is an alumna of the World Economic Forum Young Global Leaders programme.
- Ewa Wojkowska and Toshihiro Nakamura are both Asia Society Asia 21 Young Leaders.
- Kopernik is a recipient of the Zayed Sustainability Prize.
- Kopernik received the Constallation Award from the Asian Venture Philanthropy Network.
- Kopernik's climate work has received recognition from UNFCCC Momentum for Change award.
