= Antonina Leśniewska Museum of Pharmacy =

Museum in Warsaw, Poland

Coordinates: 52°14′56.5″N 21°00′41.2″E

- Muzeum Farmacji im. mgr Antoniny Leśniewskiej
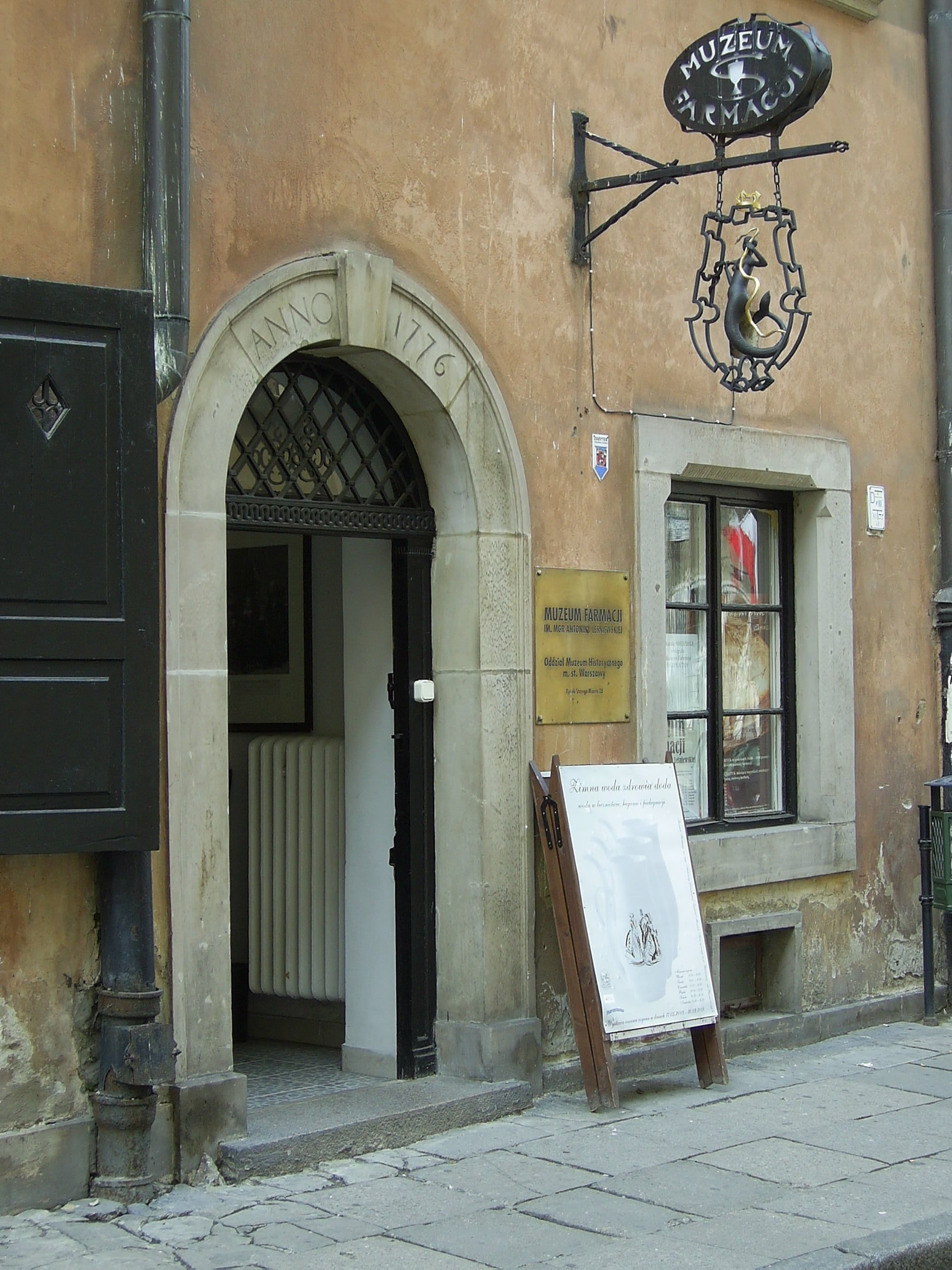
- Established: 1985
- Location: 31/33 Piwna Street, Warsaw, Poland
- Curator: Dr. habil. Iwona Arabas
- Website: muzeumfarmacji.muzeumwarszawy.pl

Muzeum Farmacji im. Antoniny Leśniewskiej w Warszawie is a museum of pharmacy in Warsaw, Poland. It is a branch of the Museum of Warsaw. It was established in 1985. Exhibits include original pharmaceutical laboratory equipment from the 1930s. There are also displays covering the history of Warsaw pharmacies.
There are over 2,500 antiquities on display at the museum.

== History ==
The museum opened on 26 January 1985. The sponsor was Antonina Leśniewska, who was experienced in the field of medicine.
In 2011, the museum has imported some of the most ancient medical furniture from the 17 and 19th centuries.
Some of the oldest antiquities came from archaeological remains from 1602.

The museum was nominated for European Museum of the Year in 2022.
