= Science Picnic =

Coordinates: 52°13′40″N 21°02′03″E

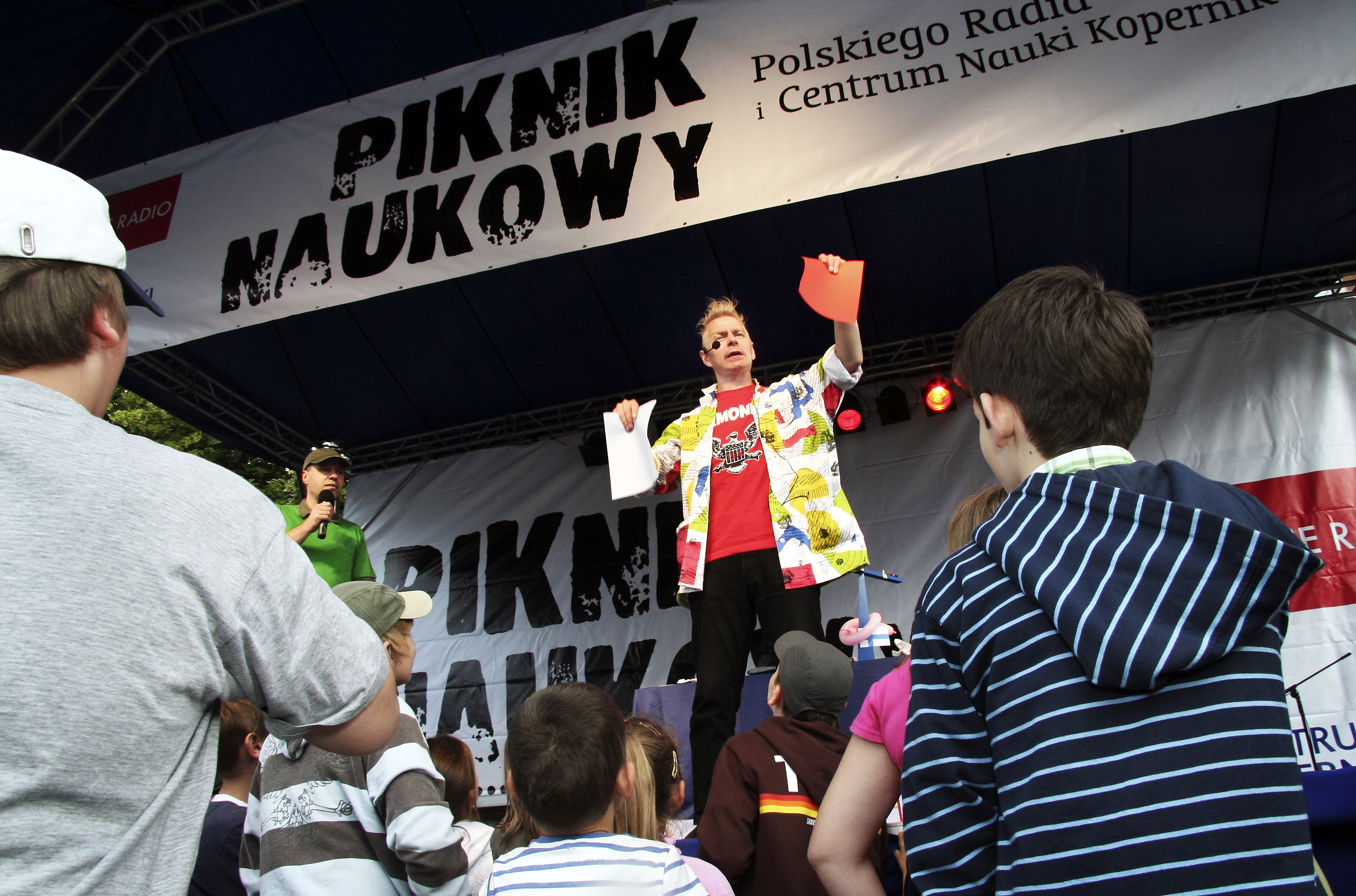
12th Science Picnic of Polish Radio

The Science Picnic is Europe's largest outdoor science-popularization event organized jointly by Polish Radio and the Copernicus Science Centre. It has been held every year since 1997. A wide range of research fields are represented at the Picnic, including the hard, natural, and social sciences together with the humanities. Research and teaching institutions from Poland and abroad reveal here behind-the-scenes aspects of their work and present science in ways accessible to visitors of various ages, using hands-on experiments and interactive exhibits.

The Science Picnic was commended by the European Commission in 2005 as one of 10 model European projects in the "Science and Society" field. The event has served as the inspiration for many other popular science initiatives, including the Copernicus Science Centre in Warsaw.

== History ==
The first Science Picnic (as Science Picnic of Polish Radio BIS) was held in the Old Town district of Warsaw. During the first edition, 17 scientific institutions held scientific demonstrations in physics, medicine and archaeology in 13 tents, and the Picnic recorded around 3000 visitors. In subsequent years, the number of participating institutions and visitors grew rapidly. The event was moved to a larger public park in 2009 and then to the grounds of the newly constructed National Stadium in 2013. Since 2008 it has been organized jointly by Polish Radio and the Copernicus Science Centre. Recent attendance varies between 100,000 and 120,000 people, with the exception of the blowout years of 2006 and 2013, when the Picnic received around 150,000 visitors.

Since 2013, Science Picnics are also held in Ukraine.

Date	Full name	Theme	Venue
1997-06-14	1st Science Picnic of Polish Radio BIS		New Town Market and Podzamcze
1998-06-06	2nd Science Picnic of Polish Radio BIS		New Town Market and Podzamcze
1999-05-22	3rd Science Picnic of Polish Radio BIS		New Town Market and Podzamcze
2000-06-10	4th Science Picnic of Polish Radio BIS		New Town Market and Podzamcze
2001-06-09	5th Science Picnic of Polish Radio BIS	How Will The World Surprise Us?	New Town Market and Podzamcze
2002-06-08	6th Science Picnic of Polish Radio BIS	What Does Science Give To Art?	New Town Market and Podzamcze
2003-06-14	7th Science Picnic of Polish Radio BIS	DNA Your Life	New Town Market and Podzamcze
2004-05-22	8th Science Picnic of Polish Radio BIS	Science Without Borders	New Town Market and Podzamcze
2005-06-04	9th Science Picnic of Polish Radio BIS	Physics On The Waves	New Town Market and Podzamcze
2006-06-03	10th Science Picnic of Polish Radio BIS	The World in Ten Years' Time	New Town Market and Podzamcze
2007-05-26	11th Science Picnic of Polish Radio BIS	M4TH3M4T1C5 AND US	New Town Market and Podzamcze
2008-06-14	12th Science Picnic of Polish Radio and the Copernicus Science Centre	Discover the Language of Science	New Town Market and Podzamcze
2009-05-30	13th Science Picnic of Polish Radio and the Copernicus Science Centre	Science Among the Stars	Marshal Edward Rydz-Śmigły Park
2010-06-12	14th Science Picnic of Polish Radio and the Copernicus Science Centre	The Great MicroWorld	Marshal Edward Rydz-Śmigły Park
2011-05-28	15th Science Picnic of Polish Radio and the Copernicus Science Centre	Freedom	Marshal Edward Rydz-Śmigły Park
2012-05-12	16th Science Picnic of Polish Radio and the Copernicus Science Centre	Energy	Marshal Edward Rydz-Śmigły Park
2013-06-13	17th Science Picnic of Polish Radio and the Copernicus Science Centre	Life	National Stadium
2014-05-31	18th Science Picnic of Polish Radio and the Copernicus Science Centre	Time	National Stadium
2015-05-09	19th Science Picnic of Polish Radio and the Copernicus Science Centre	Light	National Stadium
2016-05-07	20th Science Picnic of Polish Radio and the Copernicus Science Centre	Health	National Stadium
2017-06-03	21st Science Picnic of Polish Radio and the Copernicus Science Centre	Earth	National Stadium
2018-06-09	22nd Science Picnic of Polish Radio and the Copernicus Science Centre	Motion	National Stadium
2019-05-11	23rd Science Picnic of Polish Radio and the Copernicus Science Centre	We and Machines	National Stadium
2020-05-09	24th Science Picnic of Polish Radio and the Copernicus Science Centre	The Climate and Us	National Stadium

== Organizers and initiators ==
- Professor Łukasz A. Turski, Center for Theoretical Physics of Polish Academy of Sciences
- Robert Firmhofer, Polish Radio (since 2006 director of the Copernicus Science Centre)
- Krystyna Kępska-Michalska, Polish Radio

== Participating institutions ==
Each year the Science Picnic is participated in by institutions from Poland and abroad (including from Belgium, Bulgaria, China, Czech Republic, Denmark, Estonia, Egypt, Finland, France, Germany, Great Britain, Greece, Hungary, Ireland, Italy, Japan, Lebanon, Lithuania, Morocco, Mexico, Portugal, Slovakia, Slovenia, Switzerland, Sweden, United States).
