= The Anatomy of Peace =

1945 book by Emery Reves

- First edition
- Author: Emery Reves
- Language: English
- Publisher: Harper & Brothers
- Publication date: 1 January 1945
- Publication place: United States
- Pages: 275
- ISBN: 1-297-49579-9

The Anatomy of Peace is a book by Emery Reves, first published in 1945. It expressed the world federalist sentiments shared by Albert Einstein and many others in the late 1940s, the period immediately following World War II.

== The book's appeal to Americans ==
In an appeal to Americans and the world, the front flap of the book's first edition in 1945 had an "Open Letter to the American People", signed by Owen J. Roberts, J.W. Fulbright, Claude Pepper, Elbert D. Thomas, and other dignitaries, which began:

The first atomic bomb destroyed more than the city of Hiroshima. It also exploded our inherited, outdated political ideas.
A few days before the force of Nature was tried out for the first time in history, the San Francisco Charter was ratified in Washington. The dream of a League of Nations, after 26 years, was accepted by the Senate.
How long will the United Nations Charter endure? With luck, a generation? A century? There is no one who does not hope for at least that much luck- for the Charter, for himself, for his work, and for his children’s children. But is it enough to have Peace by Luck? Peace by Law is what the peoples of the world, beginning with our selves, can have if they want it. And now is the time to get it.

== Content ==
Coming at a critical time in history with its first edition in October 1945, Reves wrote of the failure of modern diplomacy and the League of Nations to prevent WWII, shortly before the founding of the United Nations. In The Anatomy of Peace, Reves argues for a federation of nations relinquishing to the federal authority the powers to manage and regulate intergovernmental relationships, while still retaining sovereignty for each of the independent nations. The federation, most importantly, would have to have legislative powers to create international law. Reves argued that world law was the only way to prevent war and that the fledgling United Nations Security Council would be inadequate to preserve peace because it was an instrument of power, rather than an instrument of law. Reves claimed that all of our attempts to create peace have been futile, whether through treaties, international leagues, socialism, capitalism, morality or religion.

Christianity, morality, and other religions, in Reve's view, were inadequate to bring peace to the world because under such systems countless "needless" deaths occurred through two world wars. Reves argued that instead the current concept of nationalism should be eliminated. Each countries' dedication to their nation has eclipsed their dedication to God, as evidenced by the fact that individuals in two countries at war each pray to the same God. Logically, according to Reves, the only way to create lasting peace is through global governance and binding international law; every nation needs to surrender some of its sovereignty to a global authority to support a lawful and more peaceful human society.

Reves would most likely contend that the United Nations lacks the global authority to effectively bring a global peace. One of the largest problems with implementing world federalism as interpreted by Reves is convincing member nations to surrender individual sovereignty to a global authority with a power stronger than the individual sovereignty of each of its member nations.

== Sales ==
The Anatomy of Peace is Reves' most widely read work, it sold more than 200,000 copies in England and was an American best-seller, selling a total of 800,000 copies in thirty languages. It was endorsed by Albert Einstein and several other prominent figures.

== Influence ==
The widely available Reader’s Digest condensed the volume, printing it in three successive issues, and it was used for a period as a textbook at Harvard, Yale and Columbia universities.

The Dallas Symphony Orchestra performed a symphony by Marvin Hamlisch called The Anatomy of Peace on 19 November 1991 and recorded it in 1992.
