= Emery Reves =

European writer and publisher (1904–1981)

- Born: September 6, 1904; Bácsföldvár, Austria-Hungary
- Died: September 5, 1981 (aged 76); Montreux, Switzerland
- Education: PhD University of Zurich, Economics, 1926
- Occupations: press agent, writer, publisher
- Known for: Author of The Anatomy of Peace, Churchill literary agent, advocate of world federalism
- Spouse: Wendy Russell Reves
- Awards: Nobel Peace Prize nominee

Emery Reves (Hungarian: Révész Imre; 6 September 1904 – 5 September 1981) was a writer, publisher and successful press and literary agent most notably for Winston Churchill and other prominent European statesmen who were predominantly antifascist and held democratic ideals. He advocated that world federalism would bring peace to a post-war world.

== Youth ==
Reves was born in Bácsföldvár, Austria-Hungary (now part of Serbia), to Simon and Gisele Gross Reves, who were Jewish middle-class property owners. As exact dates of his birth and death vary, those provided by his widow for his tombstone are used. A brilliant student in Budapest, he moved to Berlin in 1922. He received a doctorate in Economics from the University of Zurich in 1926 and wrote on the economic theories of Walther Rathenau, a German politician and successful industrialist of Jewish ancestry who served as foreign minister. A strong proponent of democratic government and a stronger opponent of autocratic rule, Rathanau was assassinated by Organisation Consul in 1922, likely for expanding trade with the Soviet Union. In Zürich, Reves wrote his first articles and conducted his first interviews with politicians. He would later lose his mother and other family members in the Holocaust.

== Career as press and literary agent ==
In the 1920s, he became a freelance journalist, focusing on the League of Nations. Statesmen including French Prime Minister Aristide Briand and Lord Robert Cecil, architect of the League of Nations, supported his desire to create an international news agency that would counter purely-nationalistic viewpoints.

=== Founding Cooperation Press Service ===
Towards that end, he founded the Cooperation Press Service and Publishing Company in Paris around 1933. It was known for its internationalism, broad circulation and strong anti-Nazi stance. It was considered the first viable wire press service in Europe. Reeves had to abandon his Press Service in Berlin after it was raided by Nazi stormtroopers on the first of April, 1933. Fleeing Berlin at the age of 29, he reopened the office in Paris. In June 1940, he was forced to flee France after the fall of Paris, by one account on a submarine put at his disposal by Winston Churchill, relocating to London. At Churchill's request, he was sent to New York in February 1941 and relocated his agency's headquarters there while retaining the use of press outlets in European cities, South America, and throughout the world.

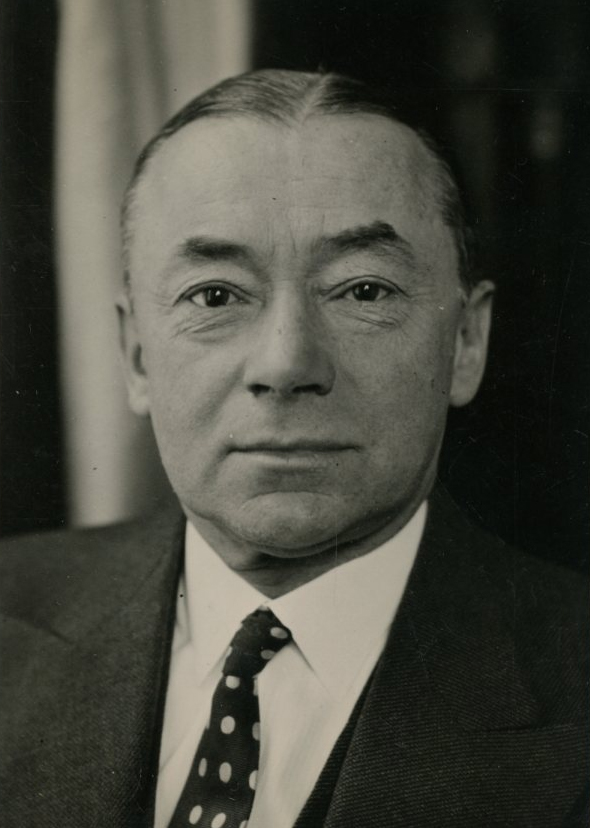
French P.M. Paul Reynaud, 1940

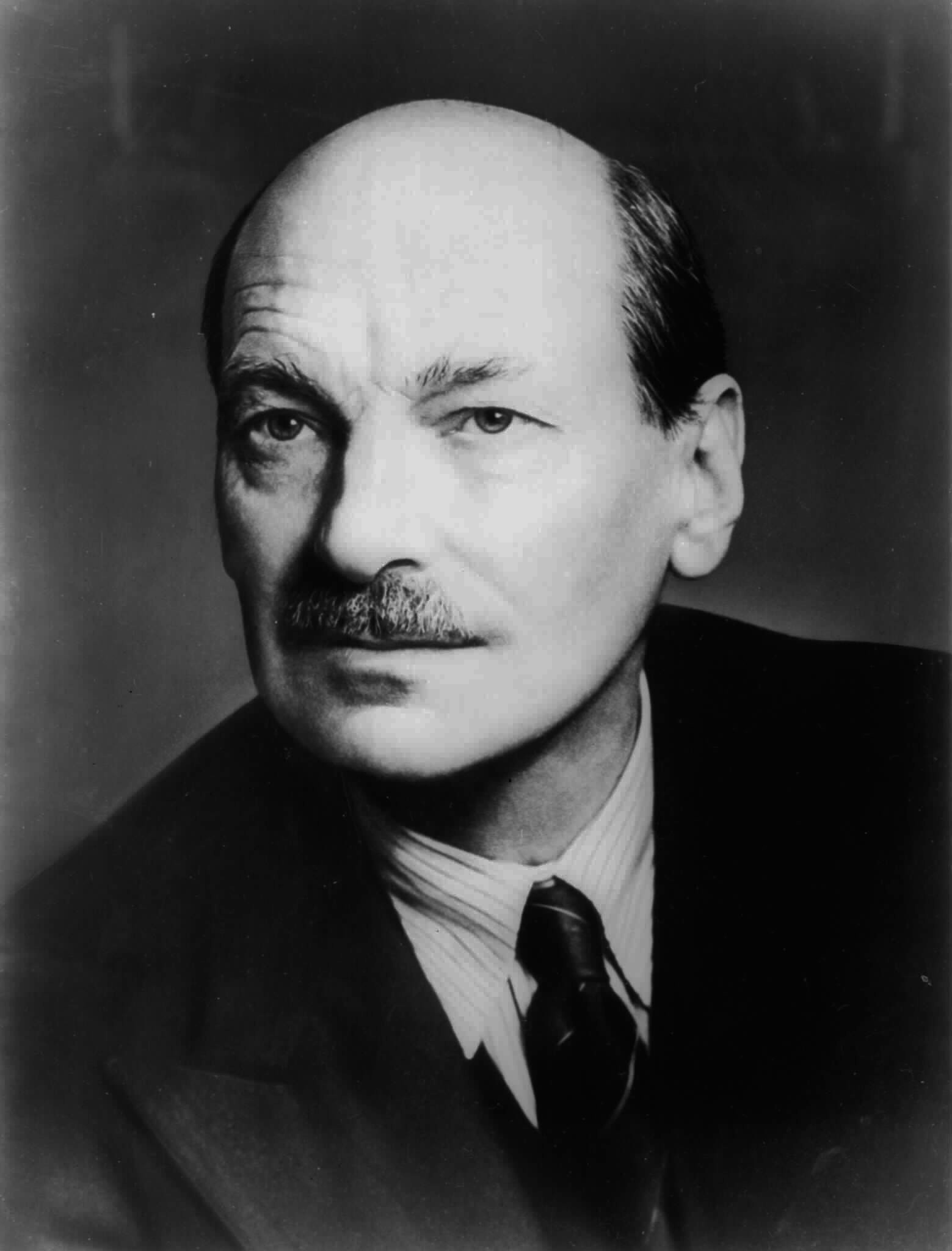
British P.M. Clement Attlee, 1945

Reves's Cooperation Press Service organized global publication of the views of over 120 European statesmen, including the French statesmen Paul Reynaud, Prime Minister in 1940, Léon Blum, a three-term French Prime Minister from 1936, as well as British statesmen, Foreign Minister Anthony Eden, a Prime Minister in 1956, and Labour Party Leader Clement Attlee, a Prime Minister from 1945. Others included the Italian anti-fascist statesman Count Carlo Sforza, the English mathematician Bertrand Russell, and Albert Einstein, a graduate of the University of Zurich like Reeves. All were opponents of appeasement with Mussolini's Italy or Hitler's Germany, at least in the years closely leading to the second World War, though Attlee had supported pacifism for a period.

== Work with Winston Churchill ==
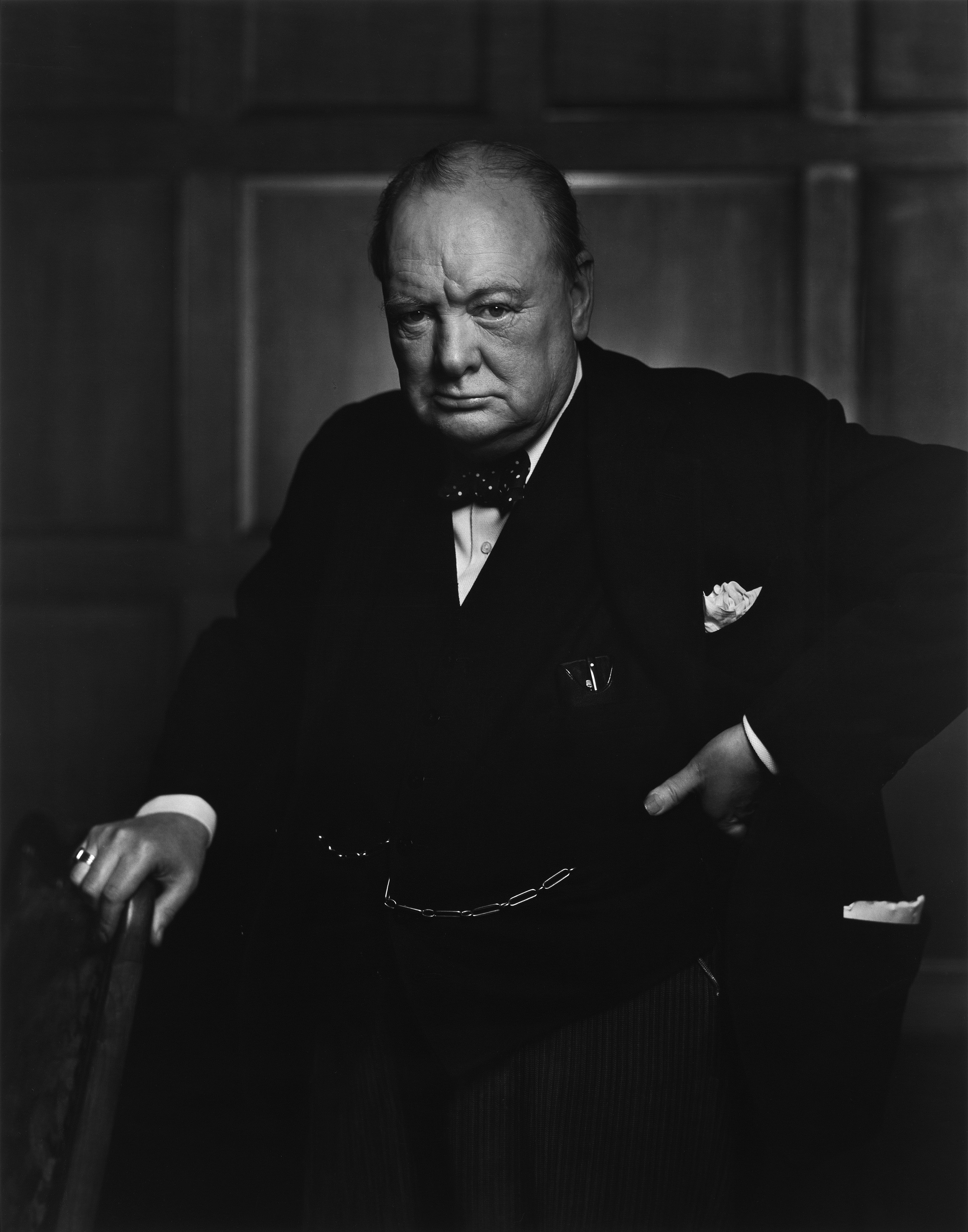
Winston Churchill, 1941

In 1937, he befriended Winston Churchill, became his literary agent and used his own Cooperation Press Service to place Churchill's articles on current world events in major newspapers across Europe. Reves's relationship with Churchill would in many ways become the most important one of his career.

Churchill's writing had cast a limited global presence, but by 1939, Reves had helped place Churchill's work on the front pages of thirty newspapers, with 750 different outlets annually, representing approximately 15 to 20 million readers in 25 languages. With Reves efforts, newspapers that published Churchill's articles in the years 1938 and 1939, included those in Brussels, Copenhagen, Riga, Stockholm, Helsinki, Oslo, Warsaw, Cracow, Kaunas (in both the Lithuanian- and Yiddish-language newspapers) and Tallinn (Estonia). Outside Europe, Reves published the same articles in cities as distant as Rio de Janeiro, Buenos Aires, Cape Town, Perth, Sydney, Colombo, Singapore, Hong Kong, Nairobi, Cairo and Jerusalem.

Referring to Reves in 1940, Churchill wrote to the British Minister of Information, "I can speak from personal experience of his altogether exceptional abilities and connections," and characterized him as "a most brilliant writer" who "holds our views very strongly". The official Churchill historian, Sir Martin Gilbert, in 1997 published an extensive record of correspondence between Reeves and Churchill from 1937 to 1964, in his book Winston Churchill and Emery Reeves.

After Churchill became Prime Minister in May 1940, Reves was sent to New York City in February 1941 to help build up the British propaganda organization in both North and South America. Reves described his mission as convincing the West that Nazi aggression seen in Europe would continue in the Americas and that the principles of non-intervention were "principles of a lost world, which lead every nation to the abyss". On February 24, he was naturalised as a British subject, after first having applied around December 1939.

After the war, he purchased the rights to publish Churchill's war memoirs, Memoirs of the Second World War, outside the United Kingdom and Churchill's extensive four-volume History of the English-Speaking Peoples. Though considered a risk by many at the time, both sold widely. He made significant personal contributions to Churchill's highly-successful six volume Memoirs of the Second World War, and the exceptional international network that he had developed since the 1930s was the key to the book's success. Significantly increasing Churchill's wealth, and retaining a roughly 10-15% commission, in the late 1940s, Reves negotiated an impressive $1.4 million in the United States, and £555,000 for Churchill in the United Kingdom for the rights to Memoirs of the Second World War, with the resulting royalties becoming impressive. Reves was a devoted follower and friend to Churchill, as in addition to the long periods of time the two men spent together between 1956 and 1960 at Reves' Villa la Pausa on the French Riviera, Reves visited Churchill at his home at Chartwell, at Morpeth Mansions before the war, and at Hyde Park Gate after it. Other noteworthy and lucrative post-war work included brokering the memoirs of Dwight D. Eisenhower, British Field Marshall Bernard Montgomery and other wartime leaders to newspapers and magazines.

== Wartime publications ==
=== Conversations with Hitler ===
Reves commissioned Conversations with Hitler by Hitler's aide Hermann Rauschning. Published in 1940 in the United States, the widely-quoted book, allegedly based on Hitler's confidences to Rauschning, was a damning portrayal of Hitler as a madman bent on world conquest and destruction. Several more contemporary Hitler historians, particularly Ian Kershaw, think that several of the alleged confidences of Hitler to Rauschning were lifted from different sources and that the book should be disregarded in respect to its historical accuracy, but Kershaw might have agreed with several of its primary conclusions.

Around 1941, Reves published Between Hitler and Mussolini, by Prince Ernst Rudiger Starhemberg, a right-wing Austrian nationalist who after the Nazi invasion of Austria fought for the Free French and the British.

=== I Paid Hitler ===
In 1941, Reves published I Paid Hitler (1941), by Fritz Thyssen, writing that he considered the German steel magnate Fritz Thyssen to be "one of the men most responsible for the rise of Hitler and for the seeking of power by the National Socialists in Germany" and attributed Hitler's rise in part to the support of leading industrialists.

According to the historian Samuel W. Mitcham, the book, which Reves published under the name Fritz Thyssen, is one of the most cited but most inaccurate sources on the relationship between high finance and Nazism. The book had actually been written by Reves, based on the stenographs of the interviews Thyssen and Reves had in France in the spring of 1940, and only a small number of chapters had been reviewed and approved by Thyssen. Thyssen, who at the time of the book's release was a prisoner in Germany, had not consented to publication and had never seen the chapters relating to his financial dealings with the Nazi Party. S. W. Mitcham quotes historian Henry Ashby Turner, who compared the stenographies with the first state of the book and according to whom even the parts approved by Thyssen contain spurious and inaccurate assertions.

The historian Wolfgang Koch, also quoted by S. W. Mitcham, shares Turner's view.

=== Story of a Secret State ===
In 1944, Reves was the publishing agent of Jan Karski's book Story of a Secret State. Reves forbade Karski any criticism of the USSR, arrogated the right to make the text more attractive and demanded half of the copyright.

== The Anatomy of Peace ==
His best known work, The Anatomy of Peace, which he wrote and published in 1945 while in New York, helped popularize the cause of world federalism. Reves argued for a federation of nations that relinquished to the federal authority only the powers to manage and regulate intergovernmental relationships but still retained sovereignty for each of the independent nations. The federation, most importantly, would have to have legislative powers to create international law.

Reves argued that world law was the only way to prevent war and that the fledgling United Nations Security Council would be inadequate to preserve peace because it was an instrument of power, rather than an instrument of law. Likely his most widely-read book, it sold more than 200,000 copies in England and was an American best-seller, in all selling an exceptional 800,000 copies in thirty languages. It was endorsed by Albert Einstein and numerous other prominent figures.

The cover of the book's first edition in 1945 had an "Open Letter to the American People", signed by Owen J. Roberts, J.W. Fulbright, Claude Pepper, Elbert D. Thomas, and other dignitaries, which began:

The first atomic bomb destroyed more than the city of Hiroshima. It also exploded our inherited, outdated political ideas.
A few days before the force of Nature was tried out for the first time in history, the San Francisco Charter was ratified in Washington. The dream of a League of Nations, after 26 years, was accepted by the Senate.
How long will the United Nations Charter endure? With luck, a generation? A century? There is no one who does not hope for at least that much luck for the Charter, for himself, for his work, and for his children's children. But is it enough to have Peace by Luck? Peace by Law is what the peoples of the world, beginning with our selves, can have if they want it. And now is the time to get it.

With his knowledge of economics, Reves profited greatly at the end of the war by speculating on the European stock exchanges. After conducting several speaking tours of his widely selling books in the United States in the 1940s, he was nominated for the Nobel Peace Prize in 1950 for his attempts to establish a model of world government better designed to obtain peace.

== Marriage and later life ==
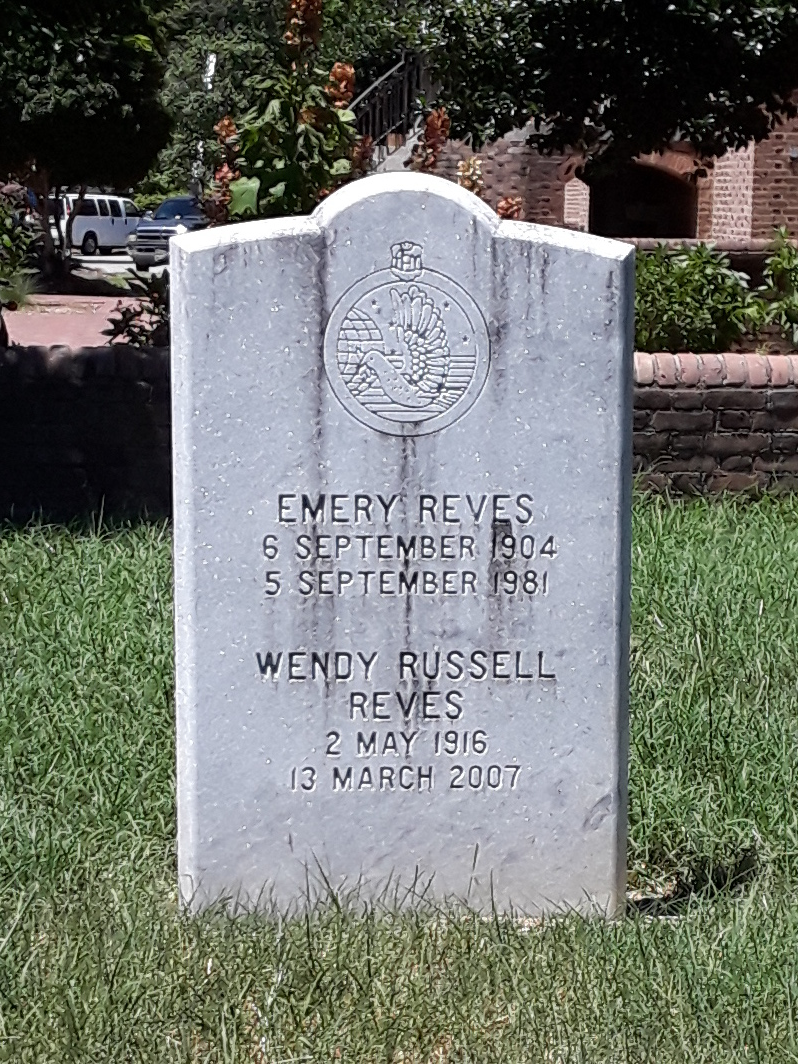
Grave of Emery and Wendy Reves on the campus of the College of William and Mary

From 1964 to his death, he was married to Wendy Russell, a former American fashion model active in New York and Paris, who had been his companion since 1948. They first met at a party at the Manhattan's Plaza hotel around 1945, and left for Europe in 1949. Reves and Russell were married in 1964 in Thonex, Switzerland. In 1954, the couple purchased a home in Southern France in the French Riviera, Villa La Pausa, which had originally been constructed for fashion designer Coco Chanel. The Reeves maintained another residence in Switzerland. Churchill was a regular guest at La Pausa in the late 1950s, but his friendship with Emery and Wendy cooled, apparently because of Clementine Churchill's dislike of Wendy. A pained letter from Reves to Churchill in early 1960, which refused to invite him to La Pausa again, shows how bitterly estranged the former friends had become; Reves wrote openly about Wendy's struggle with depression and seemed to imply that Clementine, if not Winston himself, had been partly responsible for it.

Though a British citizen after February 1940, as an internationalist, he spent little of his life in the United Kingdom. He withdrew from his life at La Pausa in his late years as his health declined. He died at his chalet in Montreux, Switzerland on October 4, 1981, and his ashes were later interred at his wife Wendy's request at the College of William and Mary in Williamsburg, Virginia. His wife would be buried there after her death in 2007.

== Philanthropy ==
=== Reves Collection at Dallas Museum of Art ===
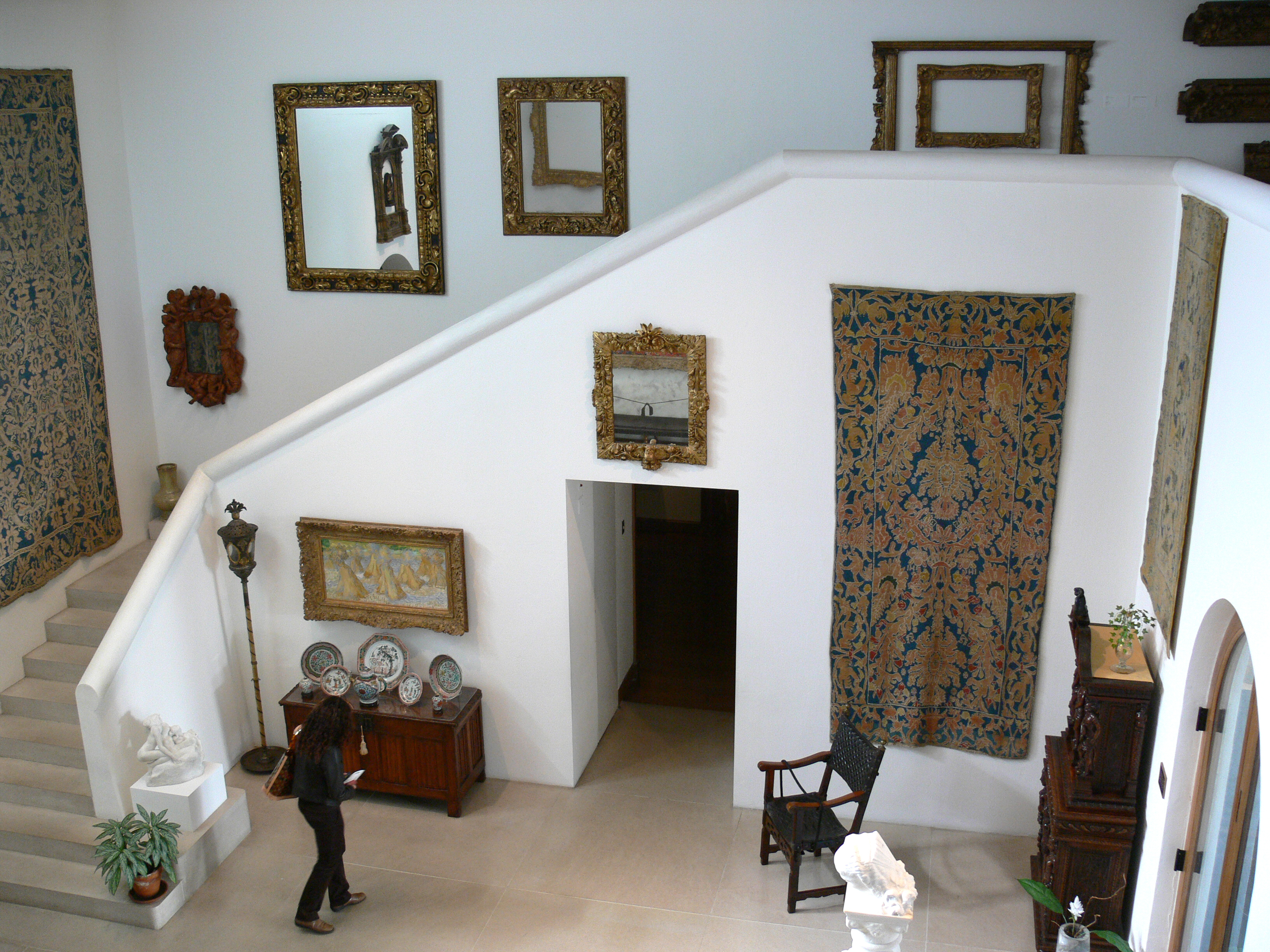
Dallas Museum's Great Hall at La Pausa

He and his wife Wendy were extensive collectors of impressionist, post-impressionist and modern art, including works by Rodin, Cezanne, van Gogh, Monet, and Degas, renaissance jewelry, furniture, silver, porcelain, and carpets, including many of Arabic and 16th-century Spanish design. Reves began art collecting as early as the 1930s and 1940s. In 1985, Reves's widow, born in Marshall, Texas, established the Wendy and Emery Reves Collection at the Dallas Museum of Art, with 1,400 featured items from this collection, with a donation that stipulated the re-creation within the museum of their 15,000-square-foot (1,400 m^{2}) villa La Pausa that would house the collection.

=== Center for International Studies ===
In 1989, Wendy Reves established the Reves Center for International Studies at the College of William & Mary to honor her late husband and his commitment to internationalism; the adjacent residence hall is also named for the couple. The Center's stated purpose is "to build international understanding through the study of foreign languages, cultures, economies, and political systems". The center "strives to promote the internationalization of learning, teaching, research and community involvement at William & Mary through education abroad, hosting international students and scholars and promoting global engagement across the university."

Wendy Reves's philanthropy included a donation of $2 million to the Morton H. Meyerson Symphony Center in Dallas, which features an entry arch named for Emery.

In 1991, the Dallas Symphony Orchestra commissioned a piece called Anatomy of Peace in Reves's memory; it was composed by Marvin Hamlisch and orchestrated by Richard Danielpour.

== Selected works ==
- A Democratic Manifesto. Jonathan Cape: London, 1943.
- The Anatomy of Peace, Harper and Brothers, 1945.
