= Copernicus Science Centre =

Coordinates: 52°14′31″N 21°01′42″E

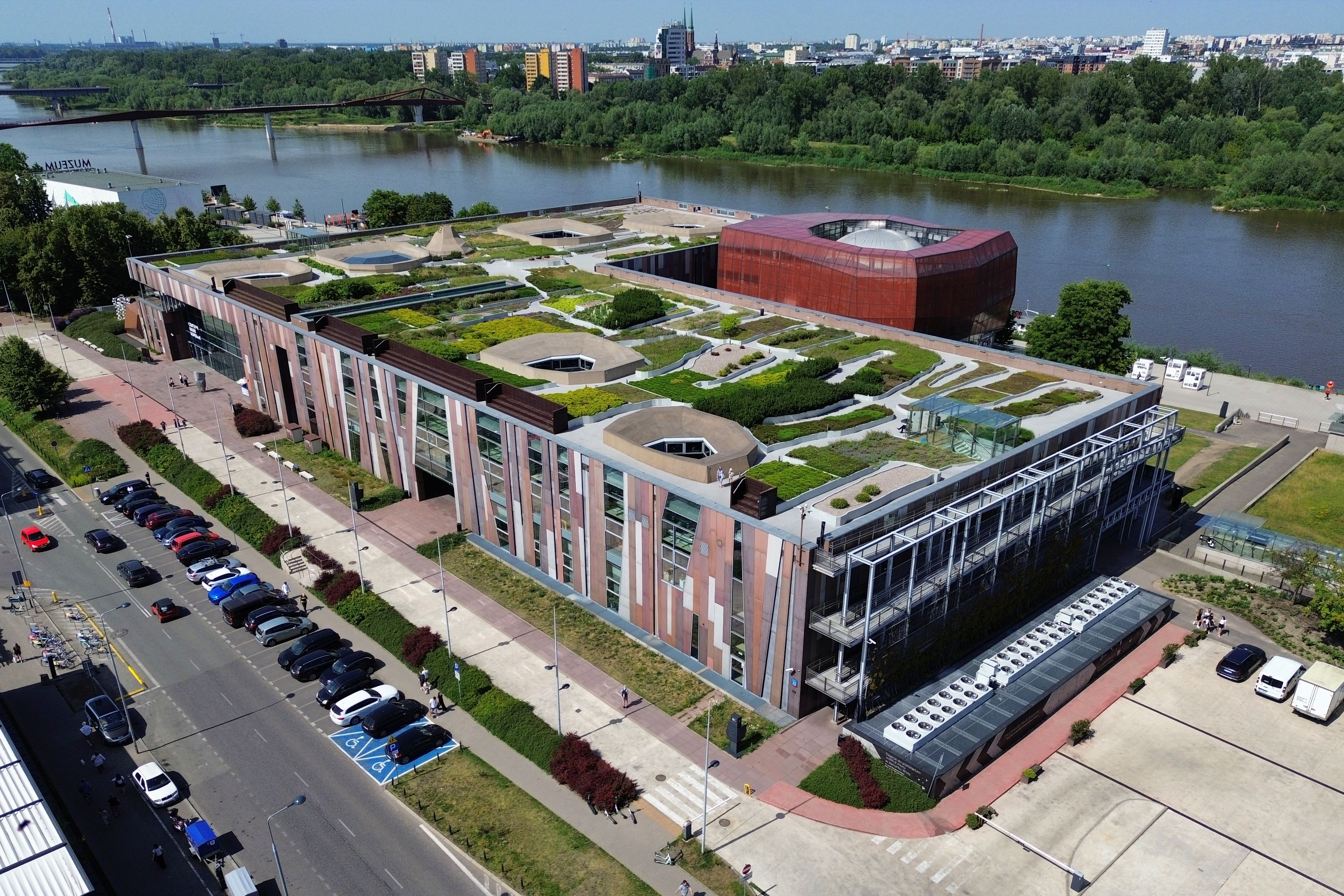
- Established: 1 June 2005
- Location: Wybrzeże Kościuszkowskie 20; Warsaw, Poland
- Type: Science museum
- Visitors: 1 million
- Director: Robert Firmhofer
- Public transit access: Centrum Nauki Kopernik
- Website: Copernicus Science Centre

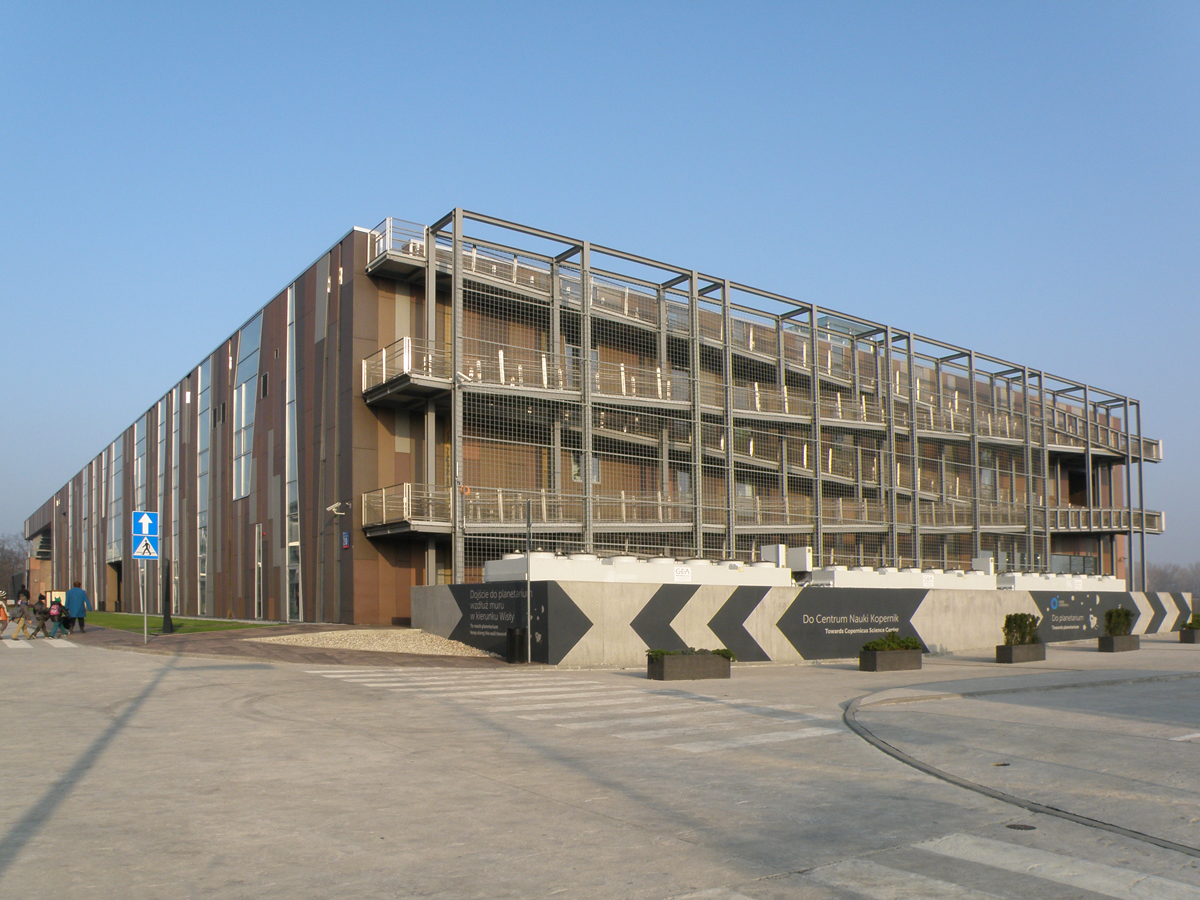
Copernicus Science Centre

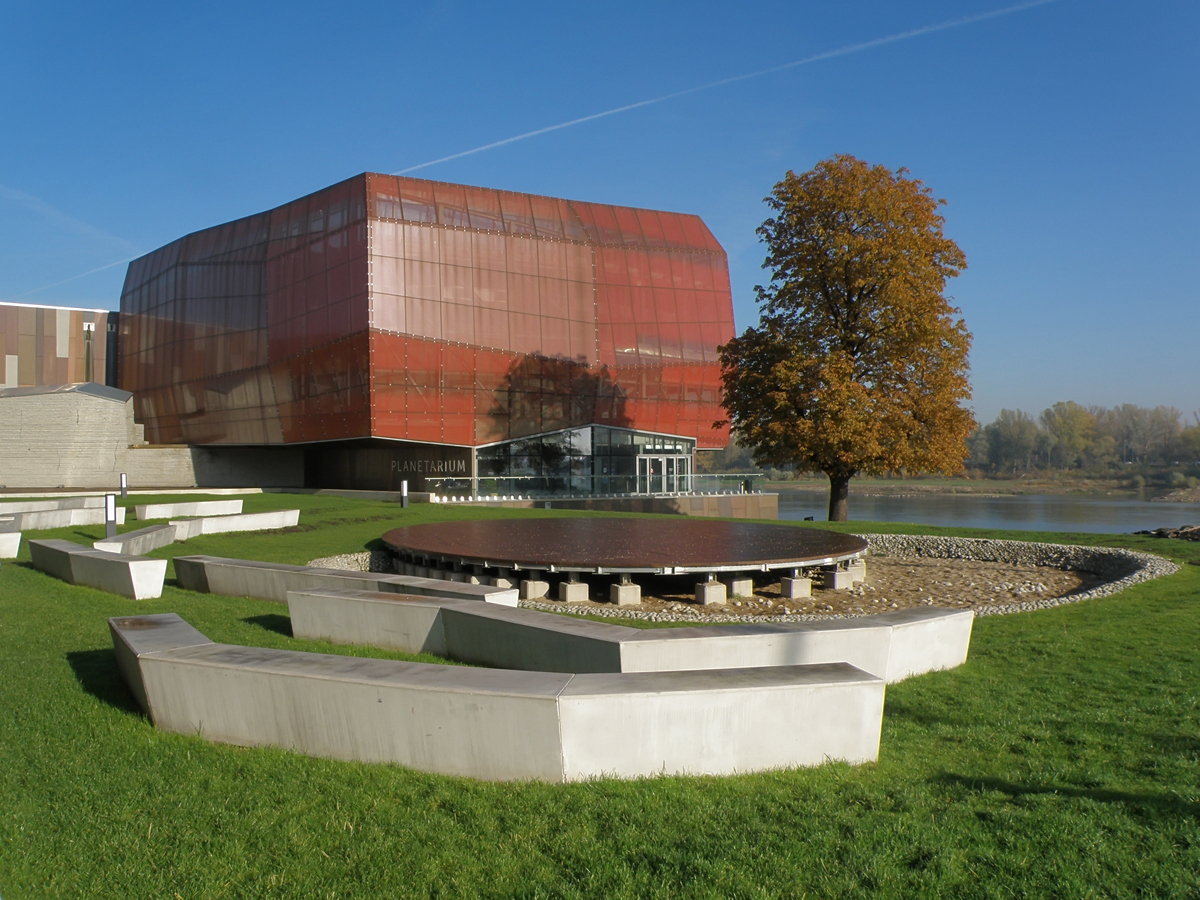
Planetarium The Heavens of Copernicus

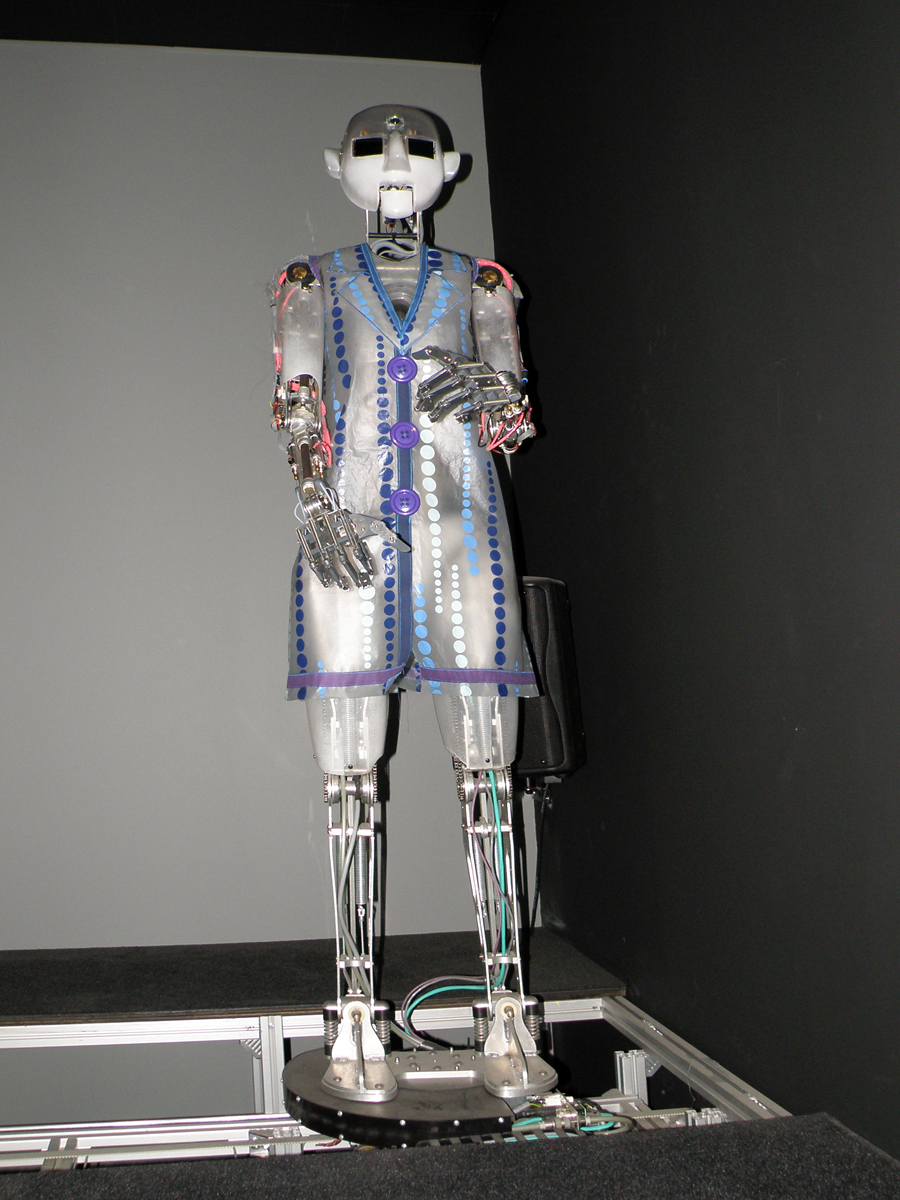
The Robotic Theatre

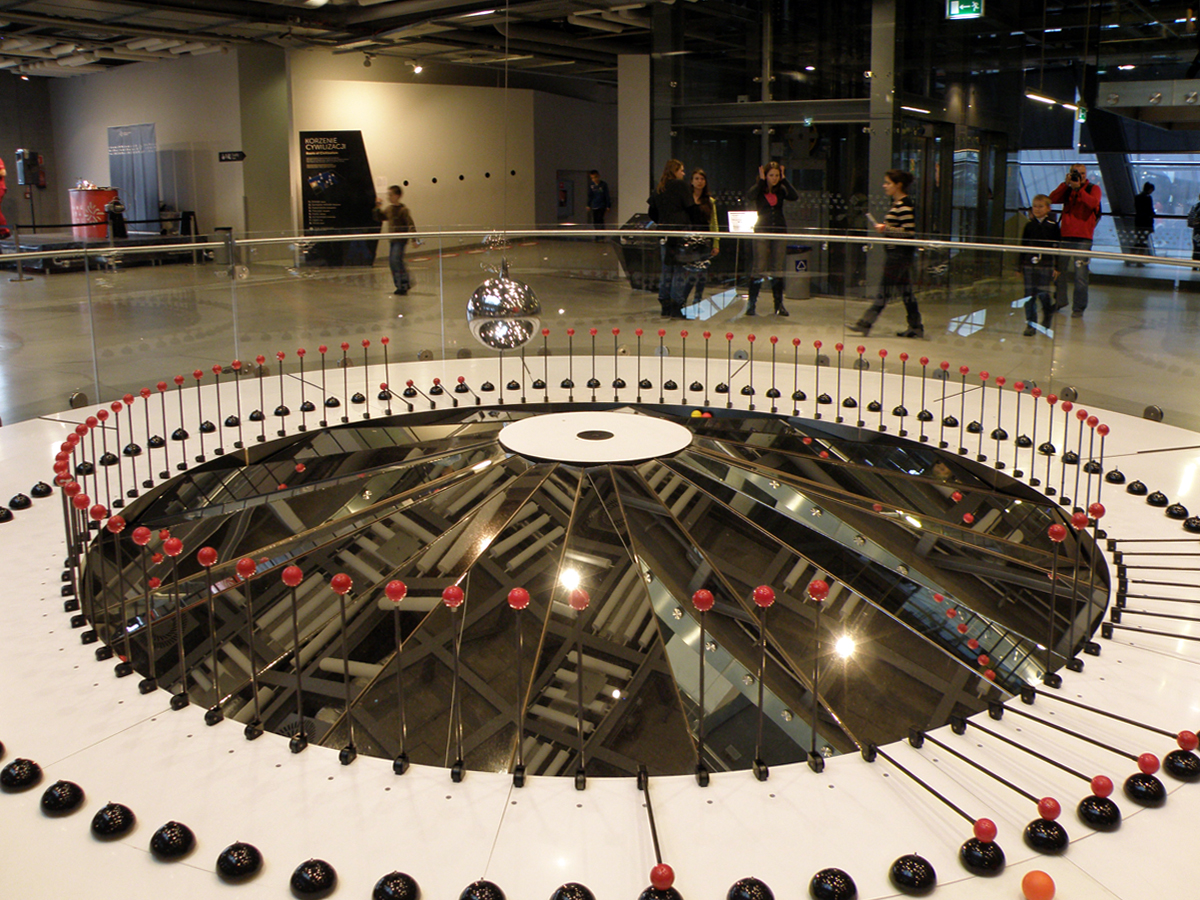
Foucault pendulum

Copernicus Science Centre (Polish: Centrum Nauki Kopernik) is a science museum standing on the bank of the Vistula River in Warsaw, Poland. It contains over 450 interactive exhibits that enable visitors to single-handedly carry out experiments and discover the laws of science for themselves. The centre is the largest institution of its type in Poland and one of the most advanced in Europe. In 2018, since its opening, it has been visited by over 8 million people.

The first module of the Centre building was opened on 5 November 2010 with five galleries (On the move, Humans and the environment, Roots of civilization, Lightzone, Bzzz!); the exhibit for teenagers – RE: generation was opened 3 March 2011; a planetarium The Heavens of Copernicus opened on 19 June, the Discovery Park on 15 July, chemistry laboratory - 18 October; biology laboratory - 15 November, robotics workshop - 6 December, and physics laboratory - 20 December.

Since 2008, the Copernicus Science Centre together with Polish Radio has organized the Science Picnic - Europe's largest outdoor science-popularization event. In 2011 the Centre hosted the ECSITE conference (European Network of Science Centres and Museums) – one of the most important events in the field of science centres and museums in the world.

== History ==
- Early 2004 - Lech Kaczyński - Mayor of Warsaw, appoints the Science Centre Team, tasked with launching work on the project
- June 2005 - An Agreement on Establishing the Copernicus Science Centre
- December 2005 - An international architectural competition for the design of the Centre building is won by the RAr-2 architectural design firm in Ruda Śląska
- June 2006 - The travelling exhibition entitled Experiment! makes its début
- November 2006 - Tender contract awarded for the design and realization of two galleries of the permanent exhibitions: On the Move and Humans and the Environment
- December 2007 – Tender contract awarded for the design and realization of permanent exhibition: Roots of Civilization
- July 2008 - signing the agreement for realization of the Copernicus Science Centre building with the winner of the tender – Warbud S.A. The beginning of the construction
- October 2008 – Tender contract awarded for the design and realization of part of the permanent exhibition: LightZone
- November 2008 – Tender contract awarded for the design and realization of permanent exhibition: Youth Gallery
- 5 November 2010 - The first building module and most of the permanent exhibitions opened to the public
- 6 December 2010 - The Robotic Theatre premiere
- 31 January 2011 - The Planetarium gets a name (Heavens of Copernicus) and a logo
- 3 March 2011 - The premiere of the RE: generation (gallery for the young people)
- 19 June 2011 - The premiere of the planetarium The Heavens of Copernicus
- 15 July 2011 - The Discovery Park premiere
- 18 October 2011 - The chemistry laboratory premiere
- 15 November 2011 - The premiere of biology laboratory
- 28 November 2017 - 75 Million
- 6 December 2011 - The robotics workshop premiere
- 20 December 2011 - The premiere of physics laboratory

== Building ==
The Copernicus Science Centre building has been erected on the bank of the Vistula River in the very heart of Warsaw (the corner of Wybrzeże Kościuszkowskie and Zajęcza streets, above the Wisłostrada tunnel). The building design was developed by young Polish architects from the firm RAr-2 in Ruda Śląska, who won an architectural competition for the Copernicus Science Centre facility in December 2005, with engineers Buro Happold.

The Centre complex comprises:

- a two-storey building with total floor-space of 15,000 square metres housing permanent and temporary exhibitions, laboratories and workshops, a conference centre, cafes and restaurants, plus office space and a distinctive rooftop garden
- a garage and a workshop on a subterranean level
- a multimedia planetarium housed within an intriguing boulder-shaped building, including an observation deck
- a surrounding Discovery Park, including open-air experimentation stations, an outdoor art gallery, and an amphitheatre.

== Permanent exhibition ==
The permanent exhibition in the Copernicus Science Centre consists of over 400 interactive exhibits. The exhibition is divided into six sections concerning various fields of knowledge:

- On the Move
- Humans and the Environment
- Buzzz! - gallery for preschool children
- Lightzone
- Roots of Civilization
- RE: generation - gallery for young adults

== Planetarium—The Heavens of Copernicus ==
The Heavens of Copernicus is a modern planetarium where visitors can see more than just images of the starry sky and related films. The shows concern a variety of popular science issues, including from the field of astronomy, natural science and ethnography.

The shows are displayed on a spherical screen surrounding the audience on all sides. Thanks to this solution, the audience experiences a feeling of immersion in the displayed world, which is strengthened by the high-quality sound system deployed around the dome.

== The Experiment! exhibition and other activities of the Centre ==
Experiment! is the first exhibition to be organized by the Copernicus Science Centre. It made its premiere appearance at the Warsaw Science Picnic in June 2006, where more than 10,000 individuals visited it in a single day. Since September 2006, it has been traveling around large cities and small towns to give their residents an opportunity to try out the hands-on experiments on their own.

The Copernicus Science Centre also organizes Family Workshops, where children (5–8 years old) together with their parents or carers can carry out experiments to help them better understand everyday phenomena (e.g. where the current in electrical outlets comes from, how a TV works, or why does yeast make dough rise). The children can easily repeat the experiments themselves at home.

The Centre takes part in various events popularizing science: the Summer and Winter in the City events, Science Festivals and the Summer with Radio event. For teachers, the Copernicus Science Centre organizes trainings and competitions.

== Form of organization ==
The Copernicus Science Centre is a cultural institution established and financed by the City of Warsaw, the Minister of Science and Higher Education, the Minister of National Education

== See also ==
- List of science centers
