= Wendy Russell Reves =

American philanthropist, socialite and fashion model

- Reves as young model
- Born: May 2, 1916; Marshall, Texas
- Died: March 13, 2007 (aged 90); Menton, France
- Occupations: New York and Paris-based model
- Known for: philanthropist, wife of Emery Reves
- Spouse(s): Al Shroeder, Paul Baron, Emery Reves
- Children: 1, Arnold Schroeder

Wendy Russell Reves (May 2, 1916 – March 13, 2007) was an American philanthropist, socialite, and fashion model.

== Early life and career ==
She was born Wyn-Nelle Russell in Marshall, Texas, and adopted the name Wendy as an adult. Her parents, David and Blanche Russell separated by 1930, and she and her mother moved to Austin, Texas, where Blanche found work. They remained in Austin until her parents reunited during the early 1930s, subsequently moving to San Antonio where she would meet Al Schroeder. Her New York modeling career began in 1939, and she appeared in Harper's Bazaar and Vogue. Virginia Pope, the fashion critic of The New York Times, described her as "one of New York's most-seen manikins [sic]."

== Marriages ==
=== Al Schroeder ===
Wendy's first husband, Al Schroeder, was a West Point graduate she met when he was stationed in Randolph Field in San Antonio, Texas. Wendy was barely sixteen when they discussed marriage, but was persuaded by her mother to wait until her seventeenth birthday to marry. They married in Hawaii, in August 1934. One year later they had a son, Arnold Leon Schroeder, but separated in 1938 after Arnold was reassigned to Washington. While living in central Texas, she took her earliest modeling job with the Canadian Fox Fur Company.

=== Paul Baron ===
She moved to New York City by 1938, and began work as a model for the Powers Modeling Agency, well-known in New York. In 1940, she married Paul Baron (b. 1911), a pianist and conductor who was the leader of the Paul Baron Orchestra, a well-known studio band of the 1930s and 1940s. He was a vocal arranger for Fifi D'Orsay, Nanette Fabray, Jane Froman, Elvira Rios, Mildred Bailey, and Lupe Vélez and was co-writer of the popular song Rum and Coca-Cola, which was a hit song in 1945 for the Andrews Sisters. The couple separated around 1945. During her life as a New York socialite, she was known to have dated Cary Grant, Howard Hughes, and Errol Flynn, and was seen often at the Stork Club and El Morocco.

=== Emery Reves ===
From 1948, she was the mistress of Emery Reves (né Révész Imre, 1904–1981), a Hungarian-born writer, publisher, financier, art collector, founder of the anti-fascist Cooperation Press Service, and advocate of world federalism. They met around 1945 at a party in Manhattan's Plaza Hotel, and eventually left for Europe in 1949. The couple married in 1964 in Thonex, Switzerland, though several sources list 1954 as the year for their marriage.

A first cousin of the conductor Sir Georg Solti and a literary agent for and close friend of Winston Churchill, Emery Reves described his wife as "a woman with a brilliant mind and imagination, tempered by much common sense. She is a woman who never bored me". In 1953, the couple bought La Pausa from Coco Chanel, a villa in Roquebrune-Cap-Martin, France, which had been built for Chanel by the Duke of Westminster.

Winston Churchill, by then semi-retired from politics, spent much of the years from 1956 to 1959 as a guest at La Pausa. He was rarely accompanied by his wife Clementine Churchill, who did not care greatly for Emery and is said to have strongly disliked Wendy. This dislike led to a cooling in the friendship between her husband and Reves, of which there is eloquent testimony in an anguished letter from Reves to Churchill early in 1960, refusing to have him at La Pausa again. Reves shows a deep concern for Wendy's mental health in this letter, referring to her emotional fragility and battle with depression, for which he seemed to hold the Churchills at least partly responsible.

== Philanthropy ==
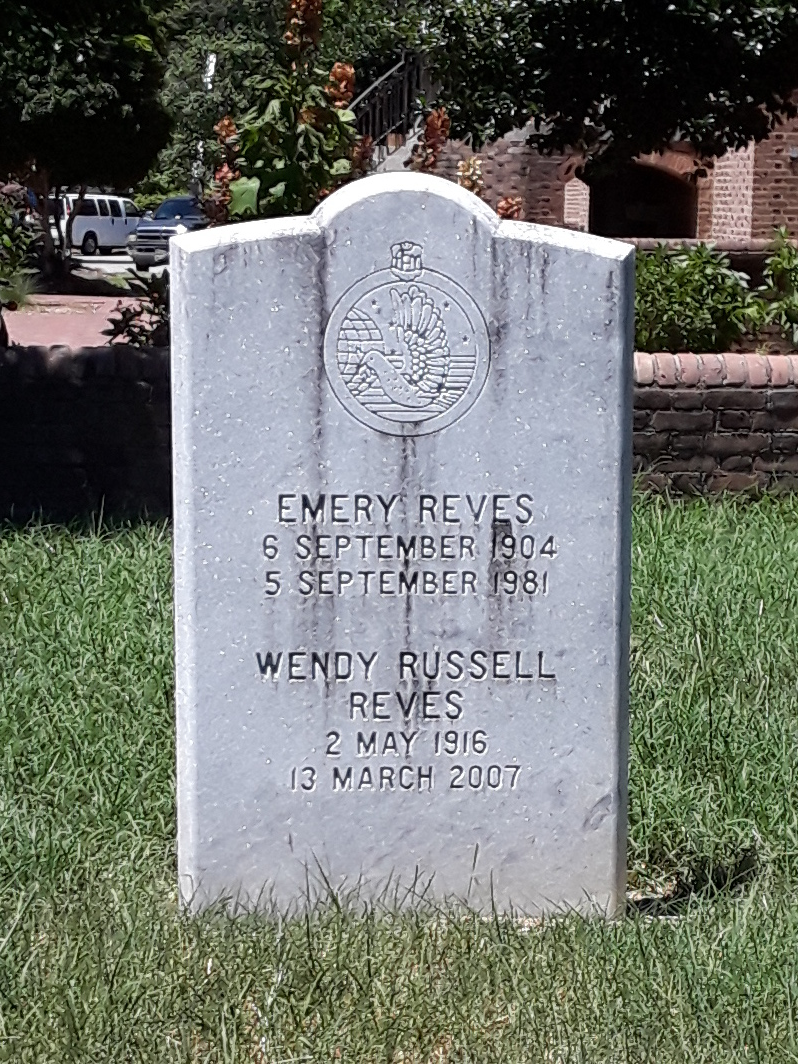
Grave of Emery and Wendy Reves on the campus of the College of William and Mary

Following her husband's 1981 death, Reves devoted herself to charitable endeavors. Among her philanthropies was the establishment of the Wendy and Emery Reves wing of the Dallas Museum of Art in 1985 (a 15,000-square-foot (1,400 m^{2}) recreation of six rooms of the Reves' villa), which displays the Reveses' extensive art collection as it was originally displayed at their villa, and in 1989 the Wendy and Emery Reves Center for International Studies at the College of William & Mary (established with a $3 million grant); the adjacent residence hall is also named for the couple. The Center's stated purpose is "to build international understanding through the study of foreign languages, cultures, economies, and political systems".

Ms. Reves also donated $25,000 to begin the Wonderland of Lights, which has become one of the largest light festivals in the United States. She was instrumental in convincing Janine Michelson, the widow of Leo Michelson, to found the Michelson Museum of Art in Marshall, Texas, to house the Michelsons' art collection.

Other philanthropic gifts included a $2 million endowment to the Susan G. Komen Breast Cancer Foundation and UT Southwestern Medical Center, establishing an international breast cancer symposium and a diagnostic and treatment center.

An additional $2 million went to the Morton H. Meyerson Symphony Center in Dallas, which features an entry arch named for her husband Emery Reves.

== Death ==
Reves died from a respiratory infection on March 13, 2007, aged 90, at a hospital in Menton near her home, Villa La Pausa in Roquebrune-Cap-Martin, France on the Mediterranean. She was buried with Emery in the College of William & Mary Cemetery, and the Dallas Museum of Art honored her with a ceremony in the Reves Gallery. Her will dictated that money from her estate go to the Reves Center at William & Mary.
