= Michelson Museum of Art =

Museum in Texas, USA

Coordinates: 32.54647°N 94.36608°W

The Michelson Museum of Art is a museum in Marshall, Texas that was founded to house the works of the Latvian-American artist Leo Michelson.

Michelson feared that if he donated his works to a large museum that they would largely be placed in storage. After Michelson's death in 1978 his wife Janine started to search for a location, and at the suggestion of family friend Wendy Russell Reves, chose Marshall, Texas (Mrs. Reves' birthplace).

The museum houses a permanent collection of works; including over a thousand paintings, drawings, and prints by Michelson. The museum's collection has expanded to include pieces not associated with Michelson. In 1999 the museum received the 20th-century American Art collection of Dr. Bernard and Gloria Kronenberg.

The collection includes paintings, drawings, lithographs and statues by fifty-three artists including Milton Avery and Georges Rouault. The Ramona and Jay Ward Collection of African Masks is another permanent collection and includes masks of the Yoruba, Senufo, and other West African peoples.

== See also ==
- List of single-artist museums
