= La Pausa =

Detached villa in France

Coordinates: 43°45′46.88″N 7°27′58.97″E

La Pausa is a large detached villa in Roquebrune-Cap-Martin, in the Alpes-Maritimes department of France. It was designed and built by the French fashion designer Coco Chanel in the early 1930s, and owned by Chanel until 1953. La Pausa was sold by Chanel to the Hungarian publisher Emery Reves. The former British Prime Minister Winston Churchill spent roughly a third of each year at La Pausa from 1956 to 1958 with Reves and his wife, Wendy, and wrote and edited part of his History of the English Speaking Peoples there. La Pausa was occupied by Wendy Reves until 2007. The principal rooms of La Pausa and its significant art collection were recreated at the Dallas Museum of Art during her lifetime and under her direction. The Reves wing was opened in 1985.

Situated above the village of Roquebrune, the house enjoys views toward Menton and the French border with Italy on one side, and Monaco on the other. Its name refers to the legend that Mary Magdalene "paused" near here on her journey from Jerusalem following the crucifixion of Jesus.

== Coco Chanel ==
Chanel bought the five-acre plot on which La Pausa was built for 1.8 million French francs in February 1929. The plot had formerly been part of the hunting grounds of the ruling family of Monaco, the Grimaldis, and contained wild olive and orange groves. The villa was built less than a year later. The final cost of the villa was 6 million francs, a large sum for the time. It is not clear whether Chanel or her lover, Hugh Grosvenor, 2nd Duke of Westminster financed the building and furnishing of La Pausa. La Pausa was built by architect Robert Streitz, who sought to build 'the ideal Mediterranean villa'.

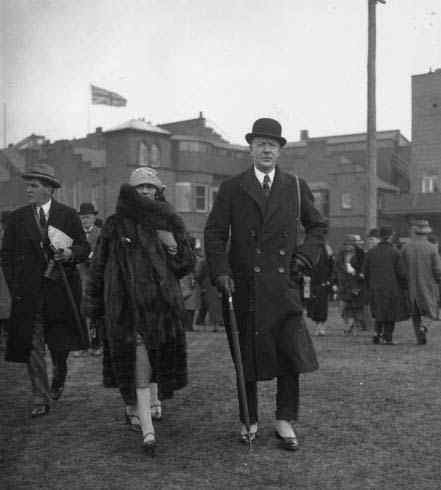
Coco Chanel and the Duke of Westminster

The design of the house modelled on the 12th-century convent-orphanage in Aubazines, in the department of Corrèze, which Chanel spent her childhood. A stone staircase leads up from the main entrance hall and a cloister encloses a courtyard. A design of five windows is repeated throughout the house, in tribute to Chanel's perfume, Chanel No. 5. Chanel bought more than 20,000 curved tiles from surrounding homes for the roof, and furnished the house sparsely in shades of white and beige. Each bathroom has a servants' entrance. Chanel would take Le Train Bleu from Paris every month to inspect the progress of the building. If Chanel was unable to make the trip, local craftsmen would be sent to Paris to meet her.

The colour scheme of the house was beige, which included a beige piano. Chanel may have been assisted in her design of the interior of La Pausa by Stéphane Boudin, the president of the interior design firm Maison Jansen.

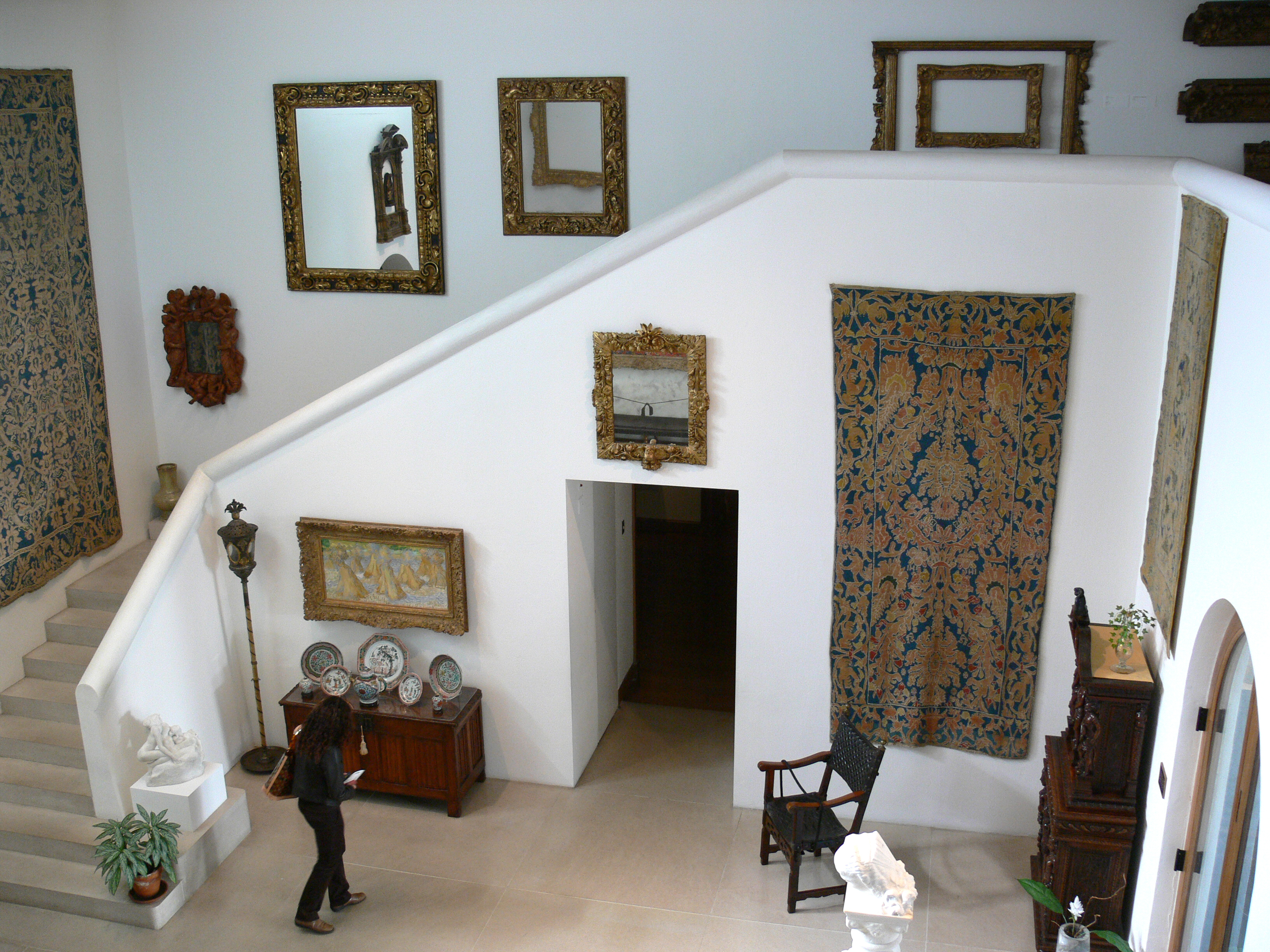
The Great Hall of La Pausa as reconstructed at the Dallas Museum of Art

The central villa is 10,000 sq ft (930 m^{2}) in size, with two smaller villas built for guests. The main house consists of seven bedrooms, with three living rooms, a dining room, two kitchens, and staff quarters. Streitz had previously restored another local villa for Chanel's friend, Count Jean de Segonzac.

La Pausa contains three wings that face onto a shaded courtyard, with the rooms containing large fireplaces. The rooms were filled by Chanel with 16th-century English oak furniture, given to her by the Duke of Westminster; English oak was also used for floors and panelling. The large reception rooms were lit by wrought-iron chandeliers from Spain.

The poet Pierre Reverdy stayed at La Pausa for long periods during the 1930s, and the poet Paul Iribe, Chanel's lover, collapsed and died while playing tennis with Chanel at La Pausa in 1935. Guests of Chanel's at La Pausa included Igor Stravinsky, Pablo Picasso, Salvador Dalí and Luchino Visconti.

La Pausa was profiled by American Vogue magazine in 1938, with the garden described as containing "groves of orange trees, great slopes of lavender, masses of purple iris, and huge clusters of climbing roses." Twenty olive trees from Antibes were replanted in the garden. The designer Roderick Cameron said that at La Pausa, Chanel was the first to cultivate lavender and other flora previously regarded as "poor plants".

The architect of La Pausa, Robert Streitz, was a member of the French Resistance during the German occupation of France in the Second World War. Streitz hid in La Pausa's cellars, from which he transmitted covert messages. Jewish refugees were also able to use La Pausa, using its gardens as a staging post in their escape from France to the Italian border. During the German occupation of France, Chanel made several visits to La Pausa with her lover, the German spy Baron von Dincklage.

The design of La Pausa also influenced Chanel's fashion designs, with her collections evoking the pink and grey palettes of the house and landscape. In 2007 Chanel released a perfume inspired by La Pausa, 28 La Pausa, as part of their "Les Exclusifs" collection. It was created by Chanel's perfumer Jacques Polge.

== Emery and Wendy Reves ==
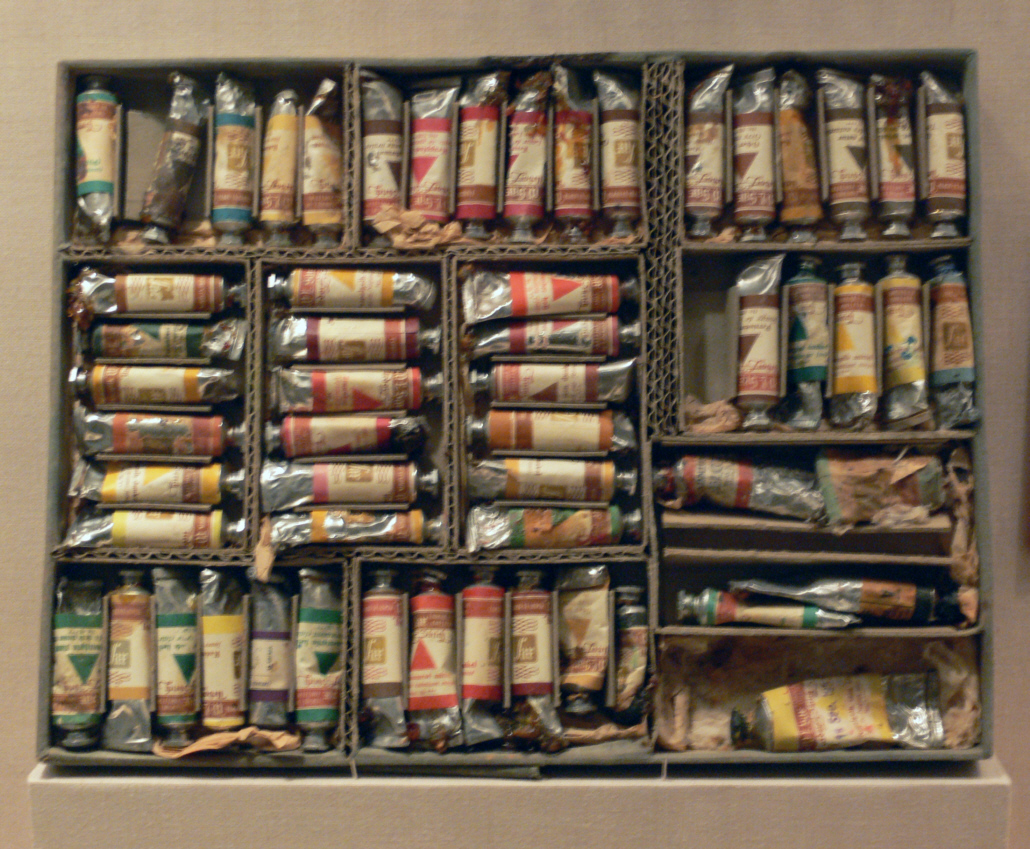
A box of paints used by Winston Churchill at La Pausa

Chanel sold La Pausa in 1953 to the Hungarian émigré publisher Emery Reves. Reves bought La Pausa from the proceeds of the foreign-language rights to the British Prime Minister Winston Churchill's book on the Second World War. Churchill subsequently became a guest of Reves and Reve's wife, Wendy Russell Reves, at La Pausa, often staying for weeks at a time. Churchill found the atmosphere with the Reveses at La Pausa relaxing, with his secretary describing him as seeming "twenty years younger" when at the house, which Churchill nicknamed "Pausaland". Guests hosted by the Reves with Churchill included Noël Coward, Somerset Maugham and Edward Molyneux. However, Churchill's wife, Clementine, found La Pausa claustrophobic, and only stayed with Churchill for four of his eleven visits to the house. Churchill would spend a total of 54 weeks at La Pausa over the three and a half years from his first visit in 1956, spending roughly a third of a year at the house from 1956 to 1958. While at the house Churchill wrote and edited part of his History of the English Speaking Peoples. Churchill would occupy an entire floor when he stayed at La Pausa; his private secretary Anthony Montague Brown, had his own office, and Clementine Churchill had her own suite. Churchill's visits to La Pausa were curtailed in 1960 after Emery Reves declined to host him, apparently because of a perceived snub by Churchill and Wendy's mental health.

Other notable high society guests hosted by the Reves at La Pausa included Prince Rainier and Princess Grace of Monaco, the Duke and Duchess of Windsor, and the actors Greta Garbo, Errol Flynn and Clark Gable.

=== Art collection, Dallas Museum of Art ===
Emery and Wendy Reves created an important collection of impressionist and post-impressionist art at La Pausa, with such artists as Paul Cézanne, Claude Monet, Paul Gauguin, Pierre-Auguste Renoir, Vincent van Gogh and Edgar Degas represented in their collection of seventy paintings. In addition to paintings their collection at La Pausa included 300 pieces of Chinese export porcelain, more than 150 silver objects, Medieval ironwork and Arabic and Spanish carpets.

Following Emery Reves's death in 1981, the Dallas Museum of Art in the United States approached Wendy Reves knowing that there was a possibility that her art collection at La Pausa might be given to a museum. In exchange for the 1985 donation Reves insisted that the museum recreate six of the principal rooms at La Pausa, and display the collection there as she had arranged it. The collection of 1,400 objet d'art is displayed at the museum as the Wendy and Emery Reves Collection in a reconstruction of five rooms from La Pausa. The villa's central courtyard and patio were reconstructed at the museum along with the villa's dining room, library, salon, bedroom, and hall, situated in a purpose-built 16,500-square-foot wing designed by architect Edward Larrabee Barnes. Wendy Reves also donated $3 million to the College of William and Mary in Williamsburg, Virginia, to establish the Reves Center for International Studies, and directed that the Reves Foundation benefit that college with 40 percent of annual endowment funding. She also arranged for herself and her husband to be buried at William and Mary.

== 21st century ==
Wendy Reves continued to occupy the house until her death in 2007. She bequeathed the Reves Foundation including the villa and its contents to the Dallas Museum of Art (which received the largest part), as well as to several charities, and the College of Williams and Mary. La Pausa was closed up after her death; in 2013 the house was described as requiring modernisation, needing new heating, electrical, and plumbing systems, as well as renovations to the kitchen and bathrooms. Repairs were also required to the stone steps and road leading to the house.

Following Reves's death, La Pausa was put up for sale, with the sale of items from the house to benefit the Reves Foundation. In 2012 La Pausa was withdrawn from sale by Sotheby's due to pending litigation. After the legal problems were resolved, Knight Frank put La Pausa up for sale in May 2013 for 40 million euros. In 2013 the French ambassador to Monaco, Hugues Moret, said of the sale that La Pausa was "part of France's heritage", adding that "We have to find a way to keep it in the family."

The villa was bought by Chanel in 2015. Following a restoration by architect Peter Marino, La Pausa is now used as a creative retreat for artists and writers.

== Works from the Wendy and Emery Reves Collection ==
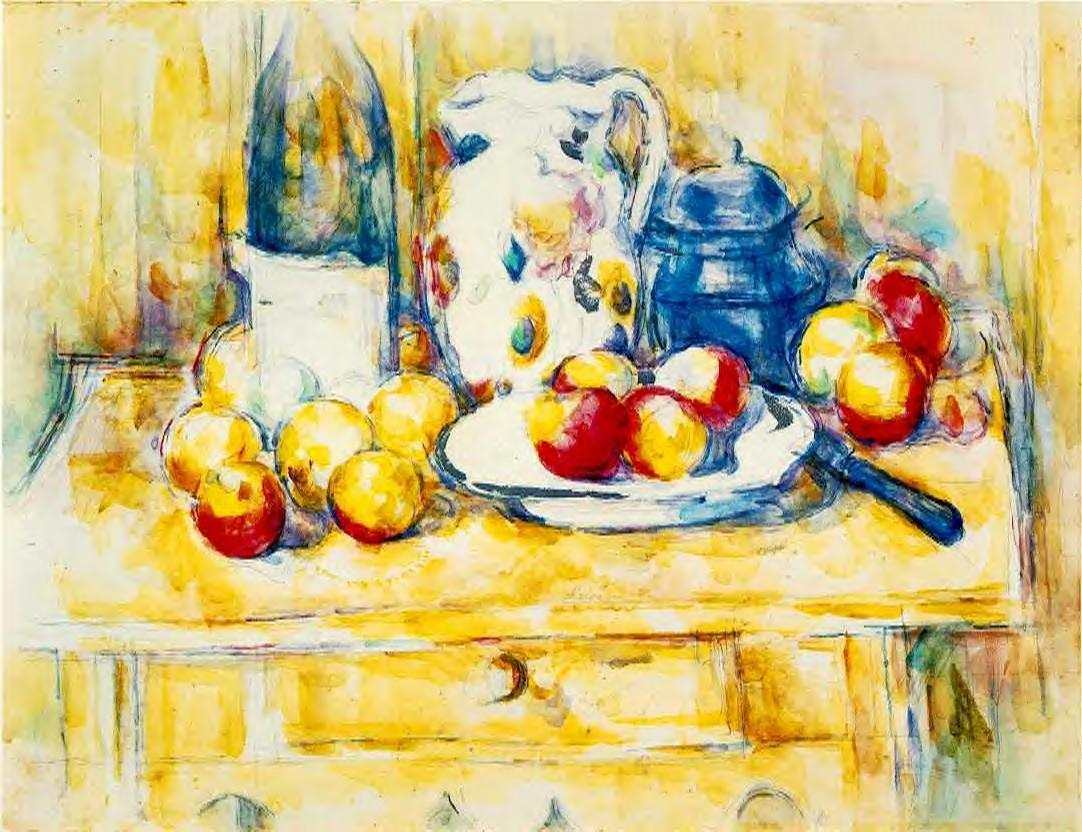
Paul Cézanne, Still Life with Apples, a Bottle and a Milk Pot, 1900–06

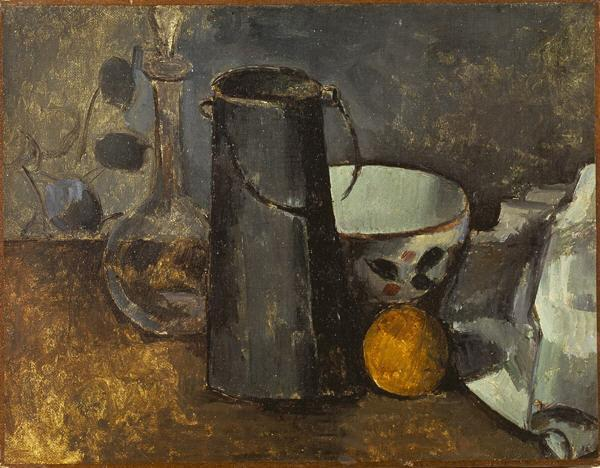
Paul Cézanne, Still Life with Carafe, Milk Can, Bowl, and Orange, 1879–80

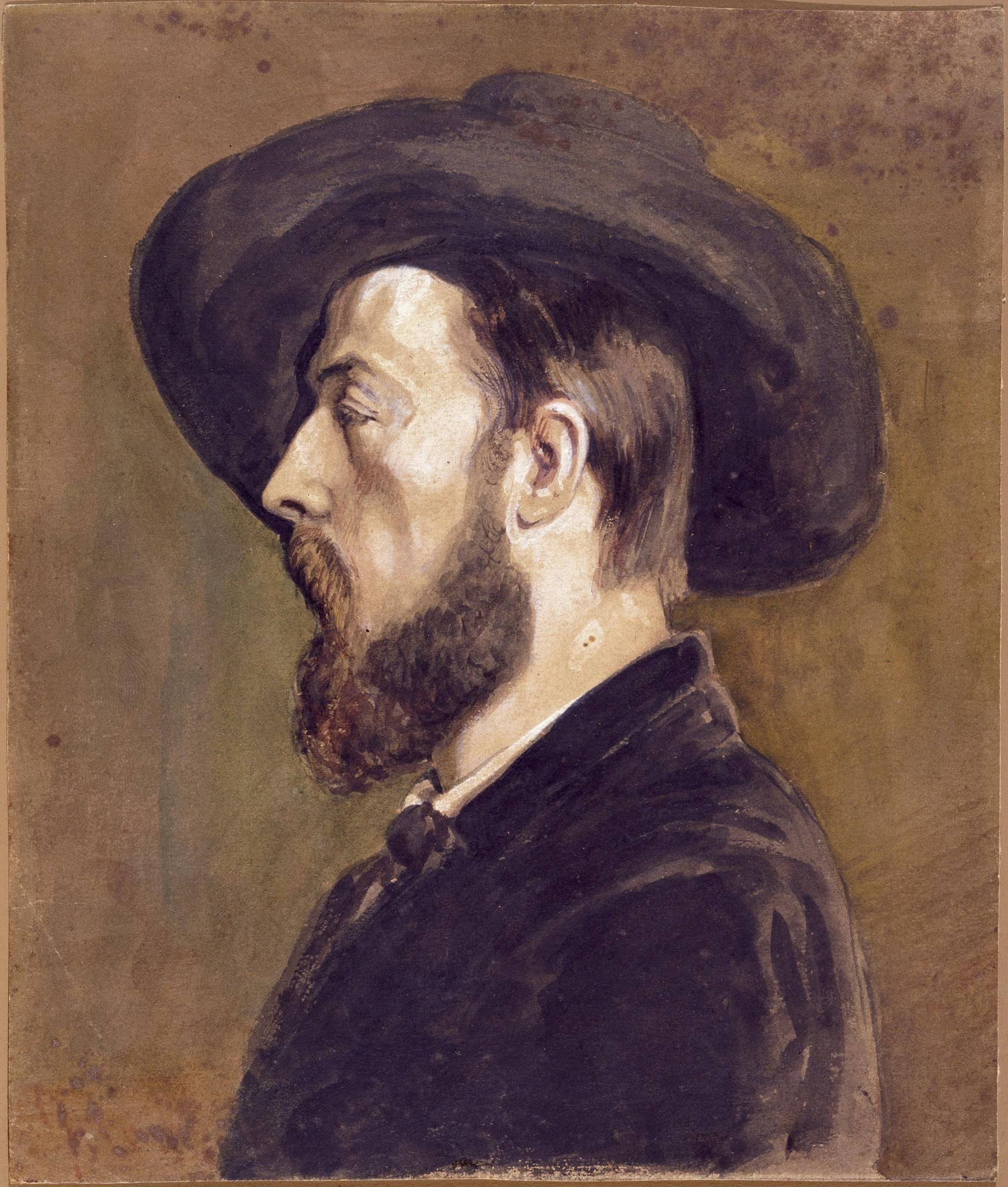
Gustave Courbet, Portrait of Jongkind

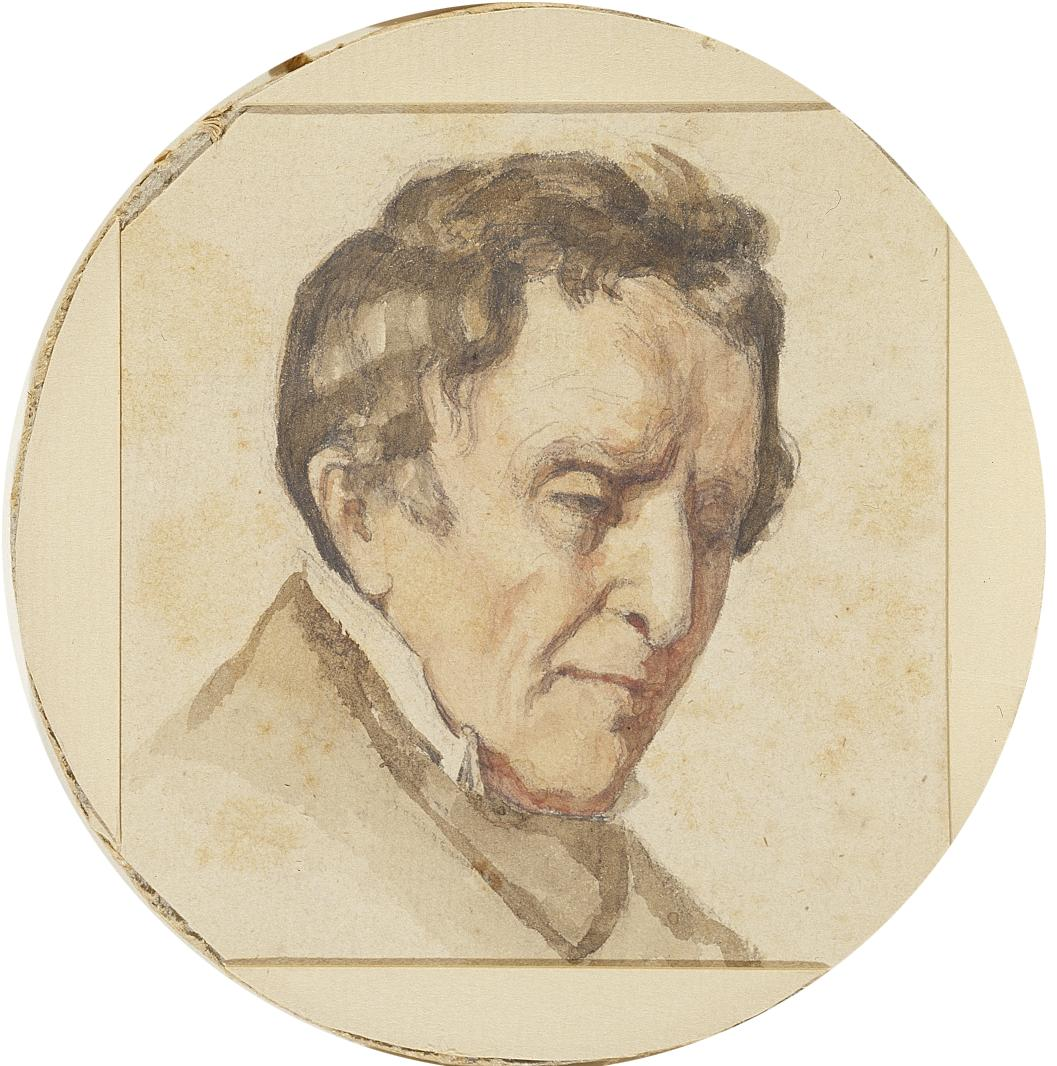
Gustave Courbet, Portrait of Regis Courbet, the Artist's Father, 1848–1849

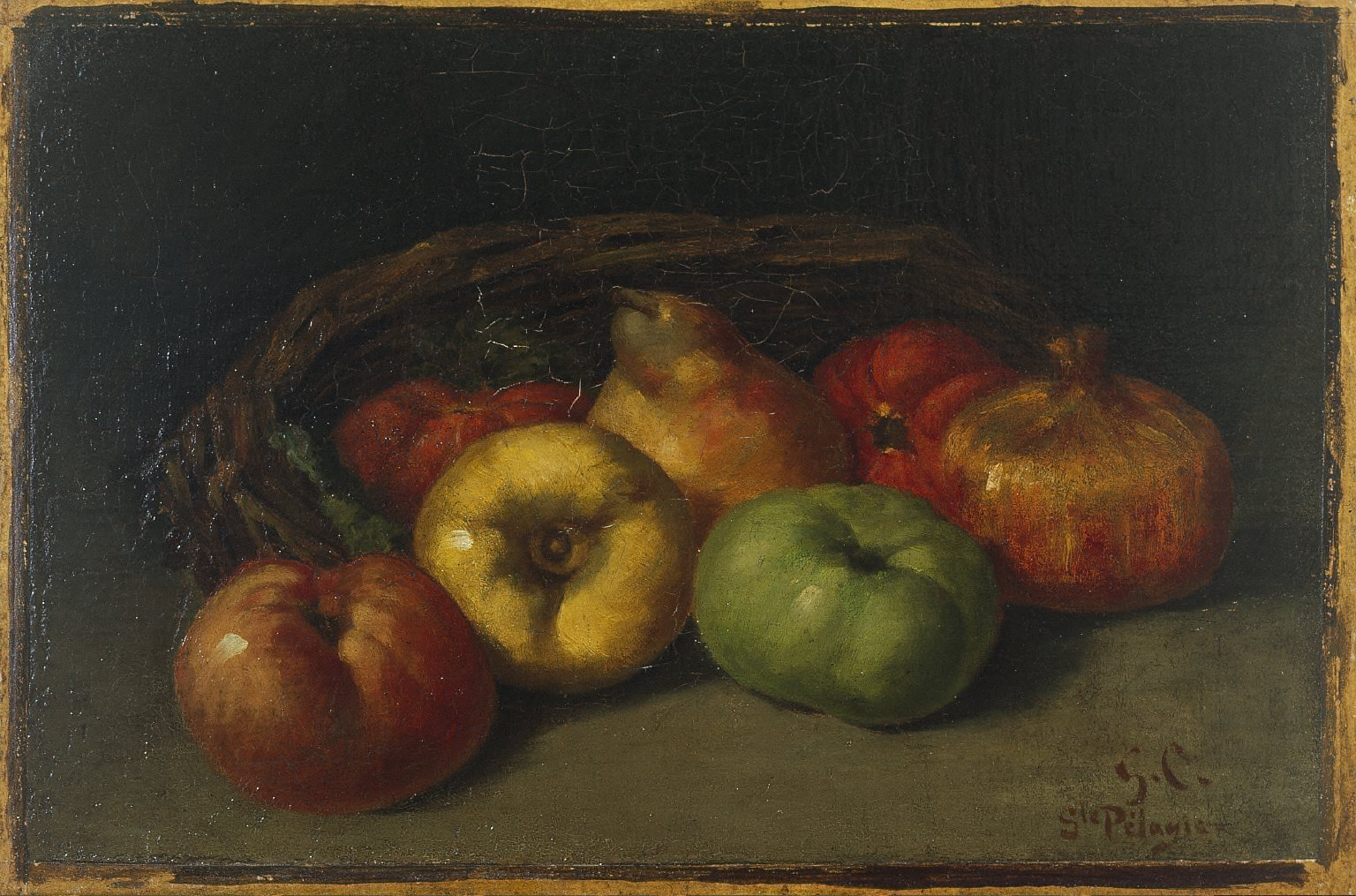
Gustave Courbet, Still Life with Apples, Pear, and Pomegranates, 1871 or 1872

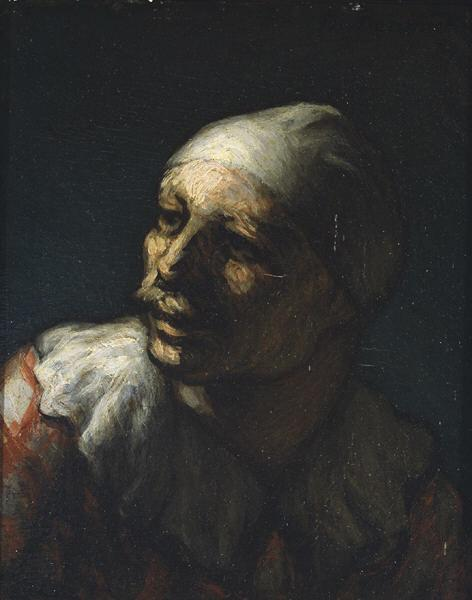
Honoré Daumier, Head of Pasquin, 1862–1863

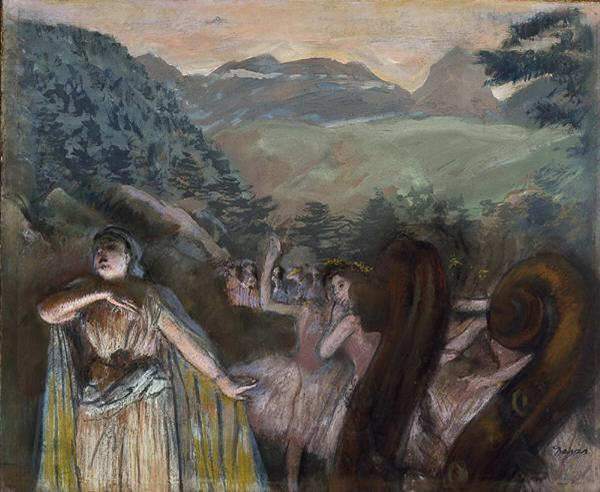
Edgar Degas, Aria After the Ballet, 1879

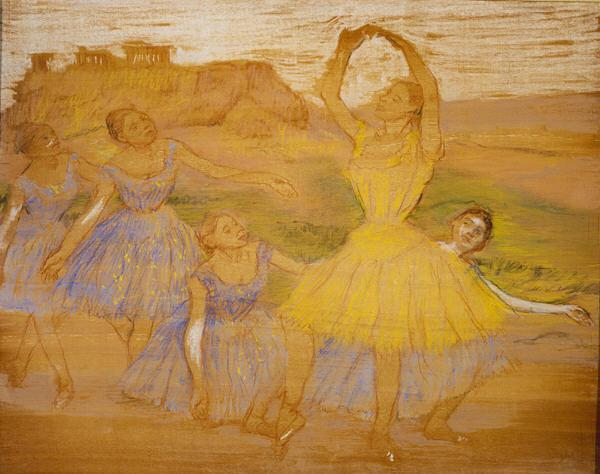
Edgar Degas, Group of Dancers c.1895-c.1897

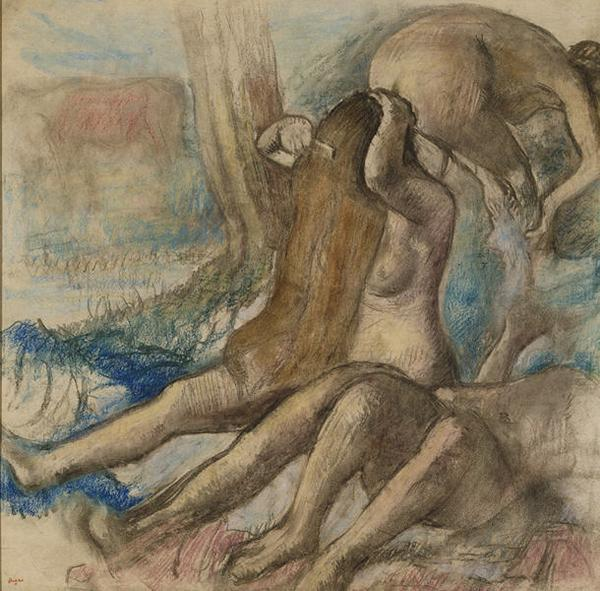
Edgar Degas, The Bathers, c.1890-c.1895

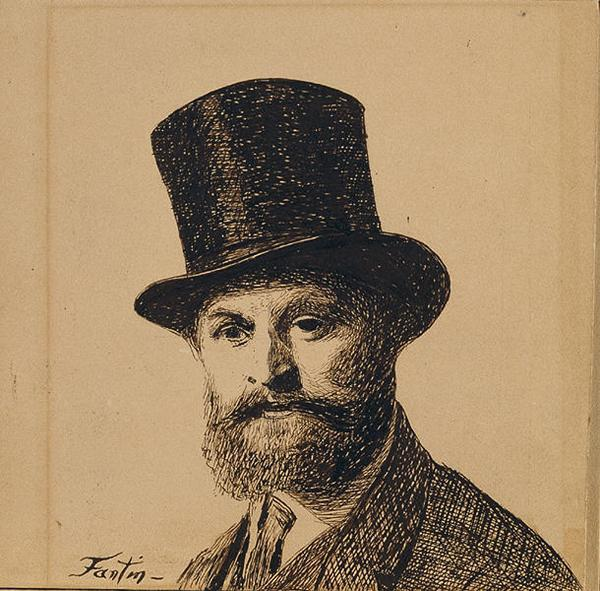
Henri Fantin-Latour, Portrait of Manet, 1867

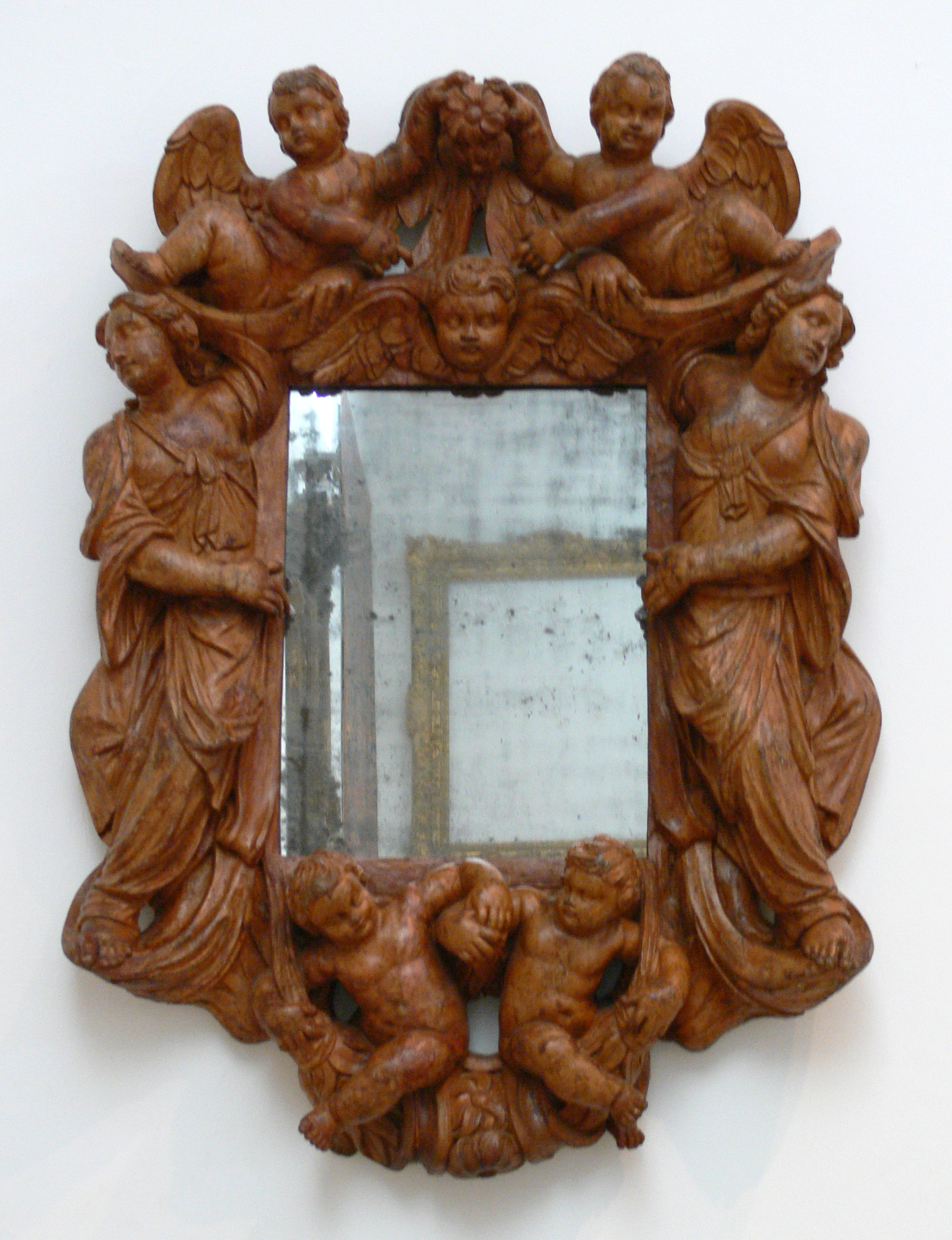
Frame with mirror

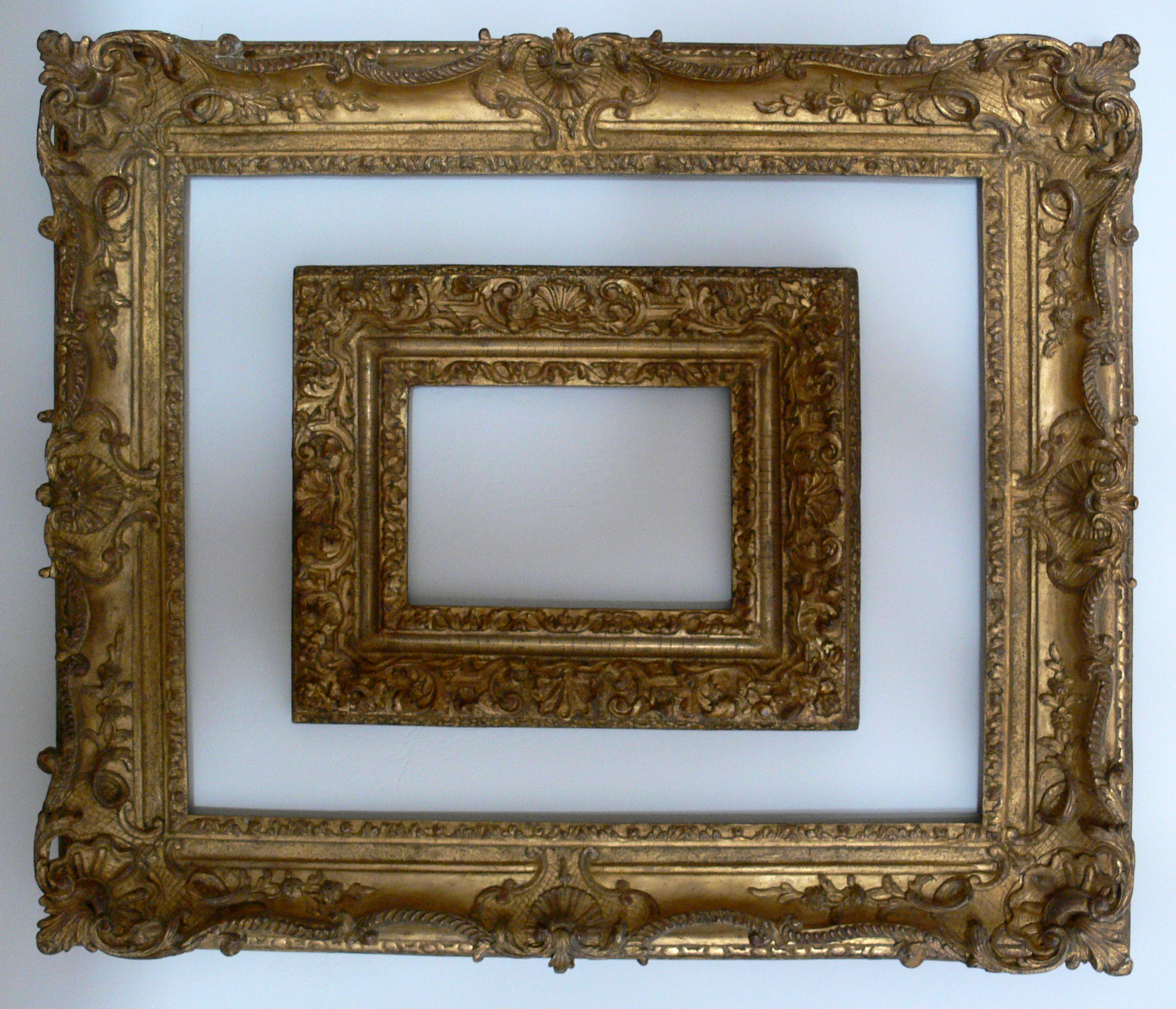
18th-century French mirror

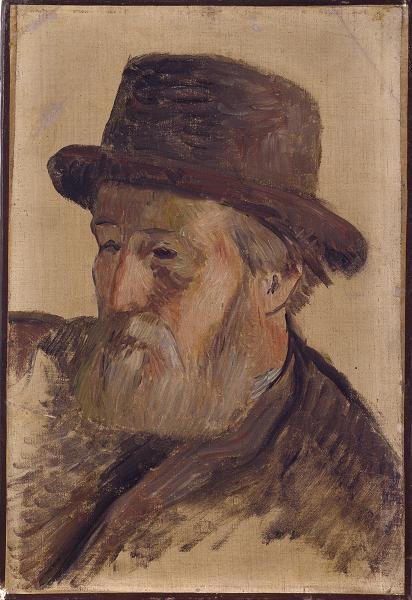
Paul Gauguin, Portrait of a man,

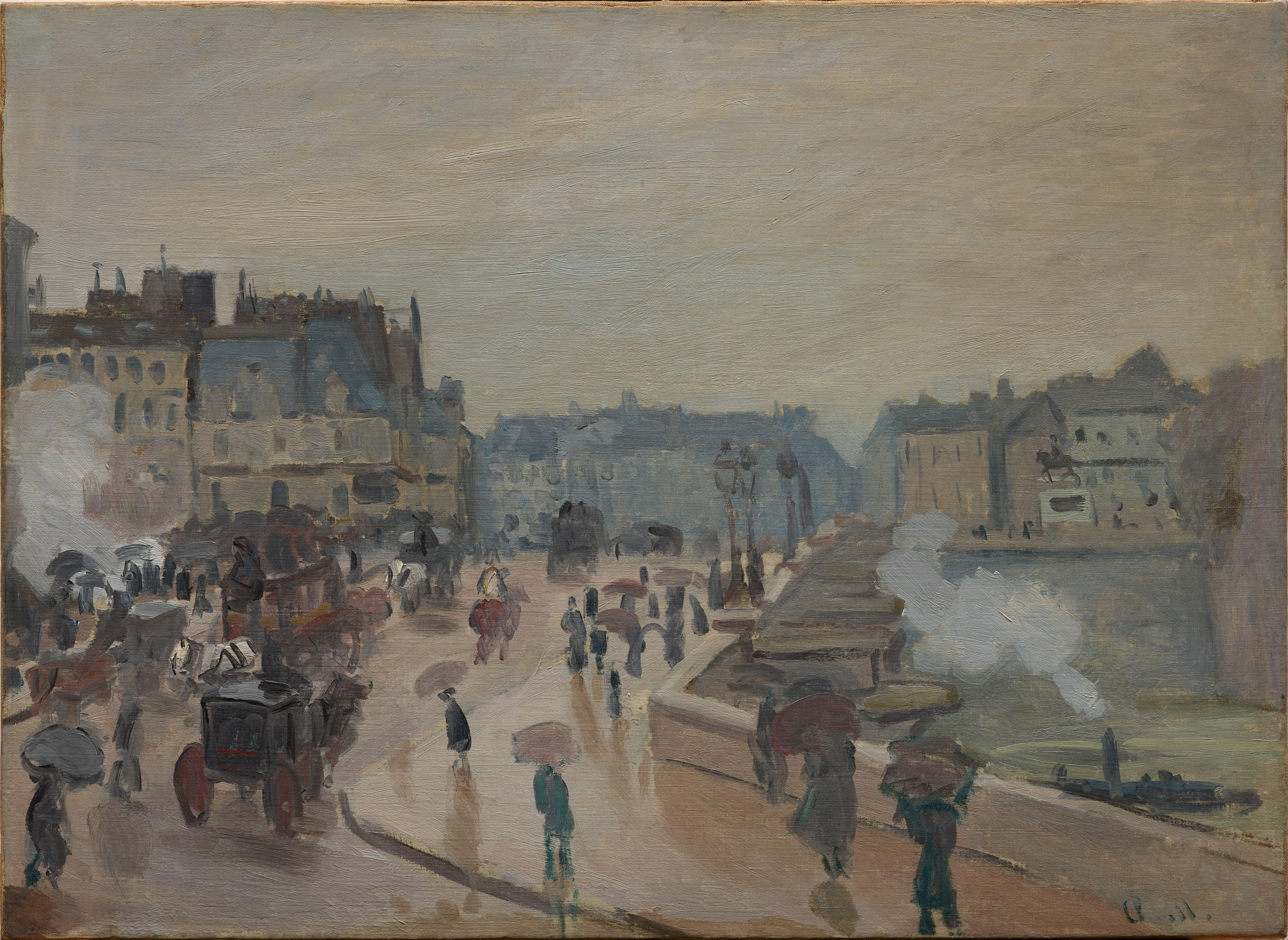
Claude Monet, Le Pont Neuf, 1871

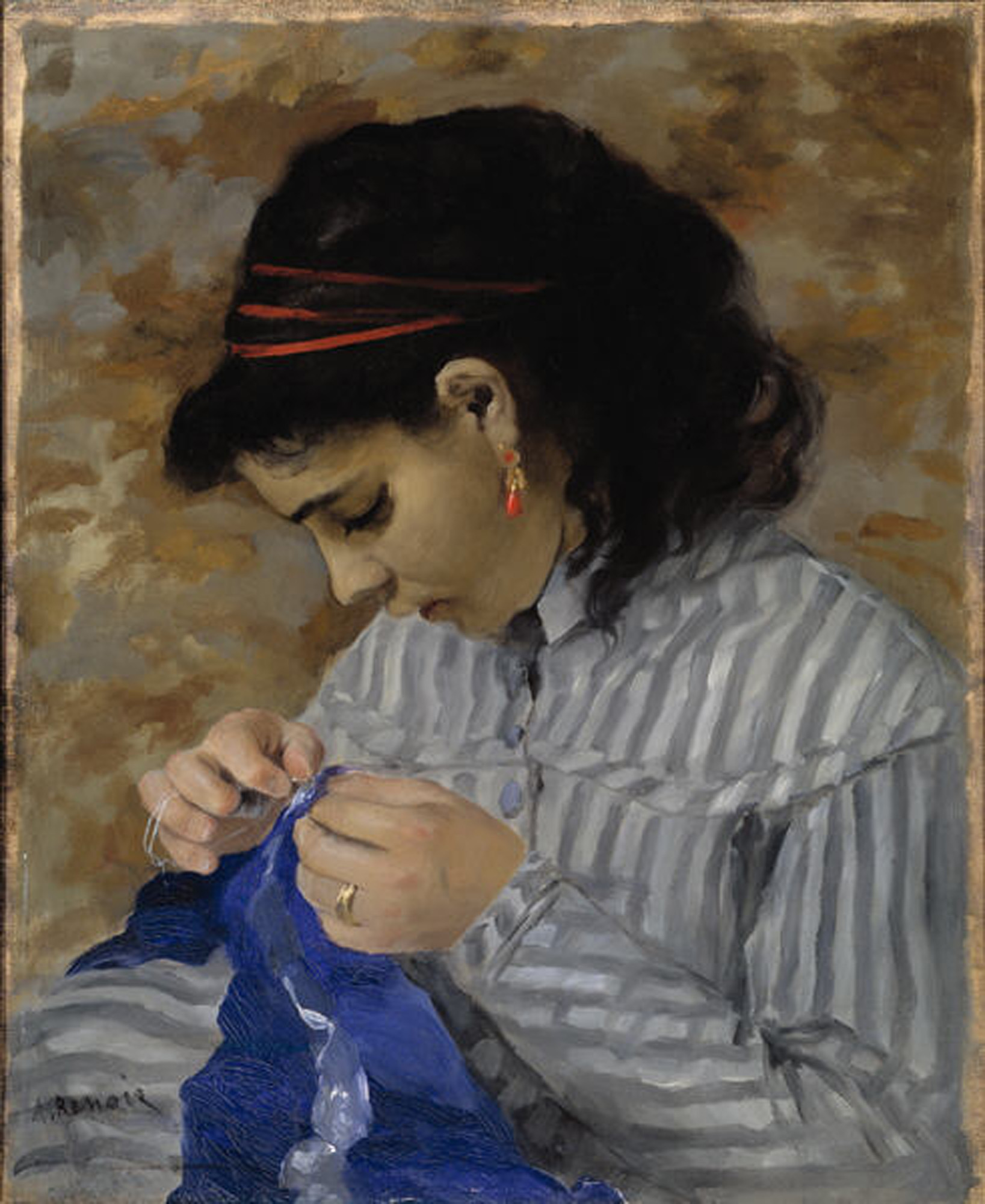
Pierre-Auguste Renoir, Lise Sewing, 1866

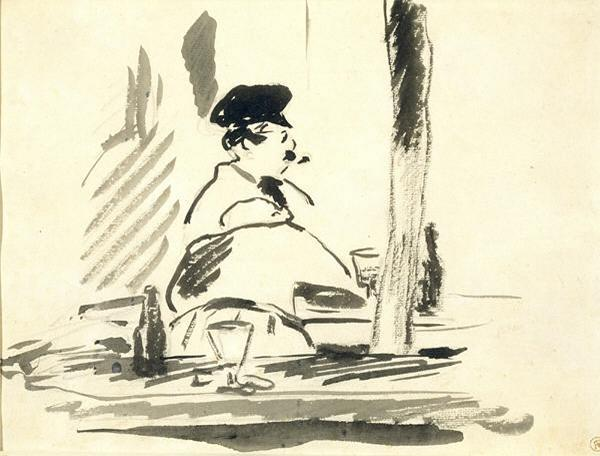
Édouard Manet, Le Bouchon, 1878

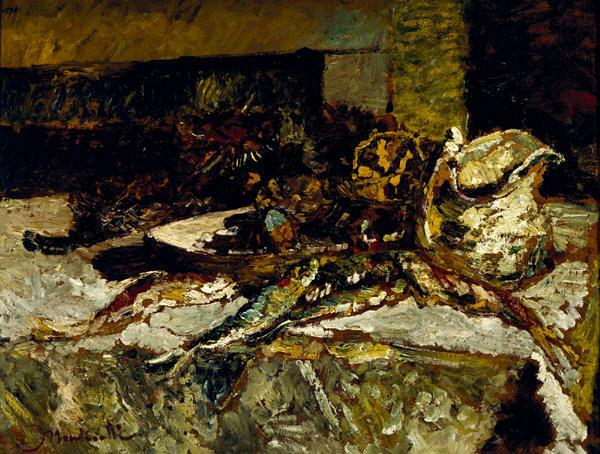
Adolphe Joseph Thomas Monticelli, Still Life with Sardines and Sea-Urchins, 1880–1882

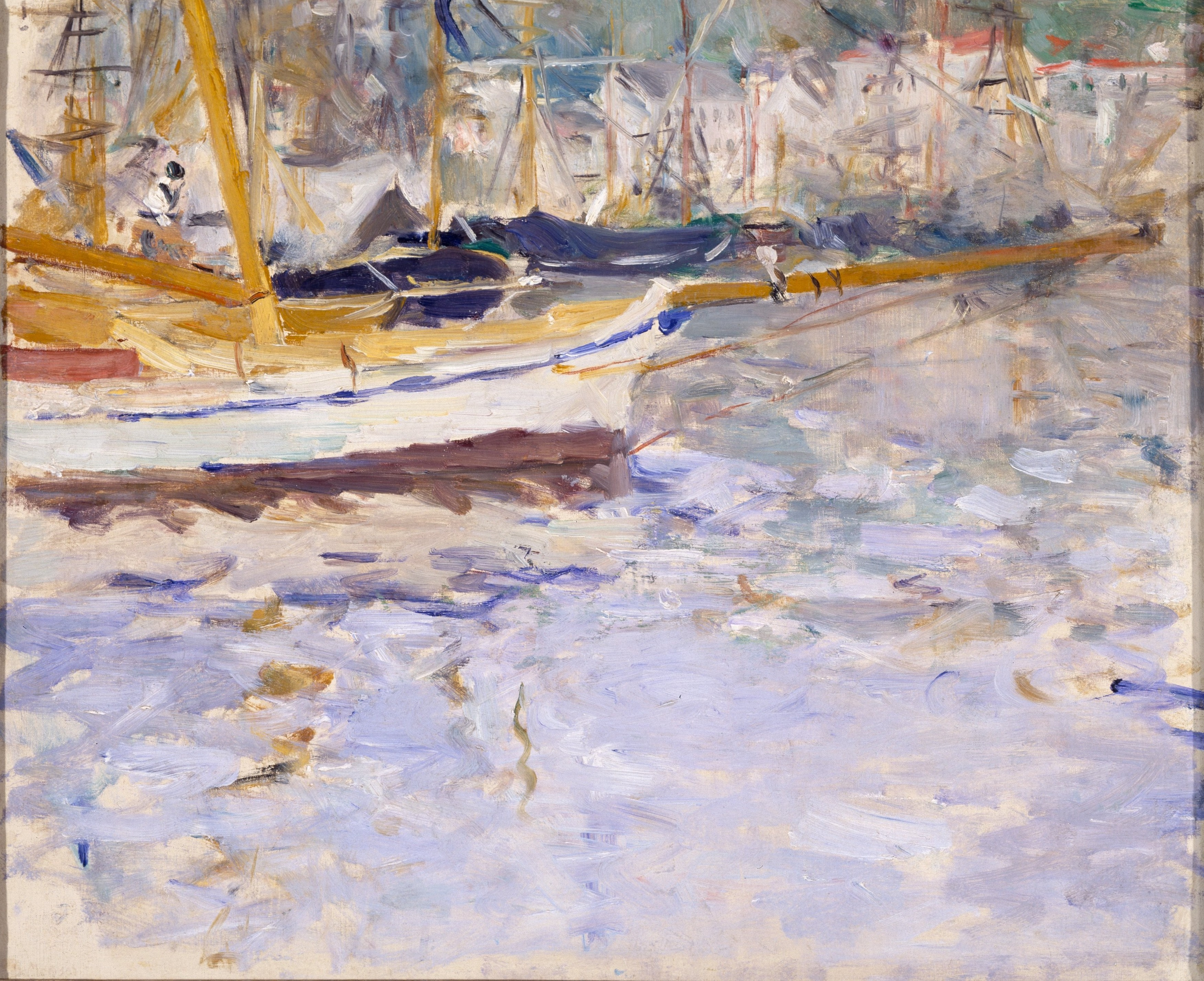
Berthe Morisot, The Port of Nice, Winter 1881/1882

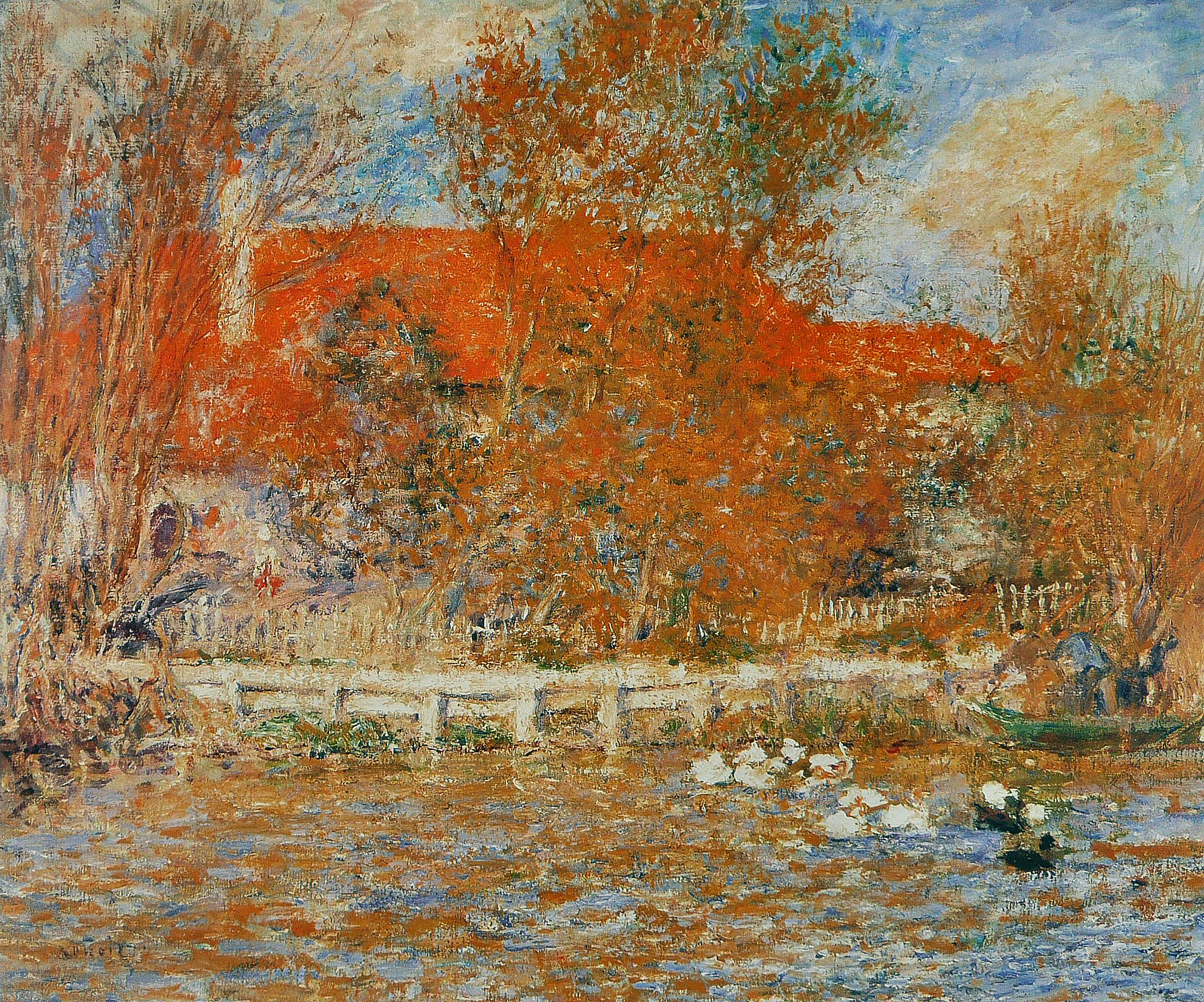
Pierre-Auguste Renoir, La Mare aux canards, 1873

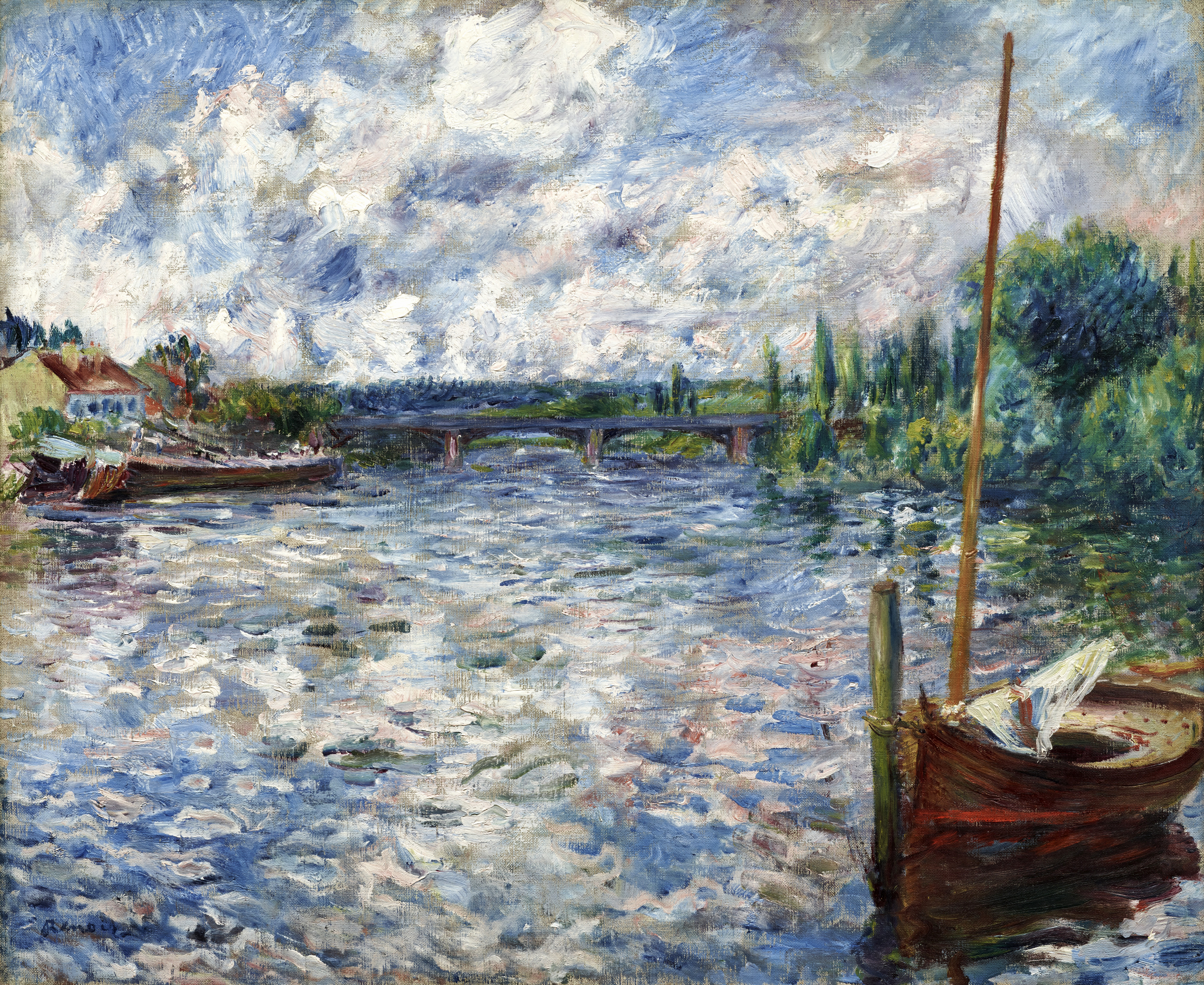
Pierre-Auguste Renoir, The Seine at Chatou, 1874

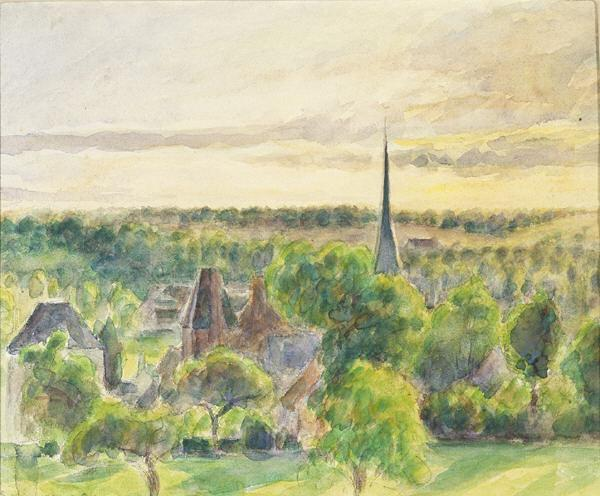
Camille Pissarro, Landscape at Eragny, 1890

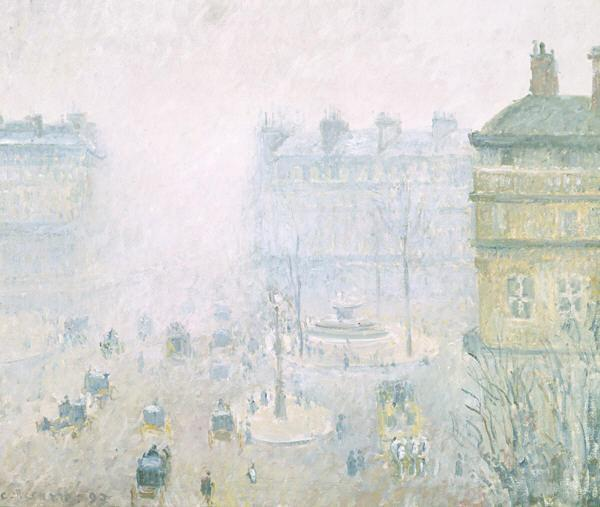
Camille Pissarro, Place du Theatre Francais: Fog Effect, 1890

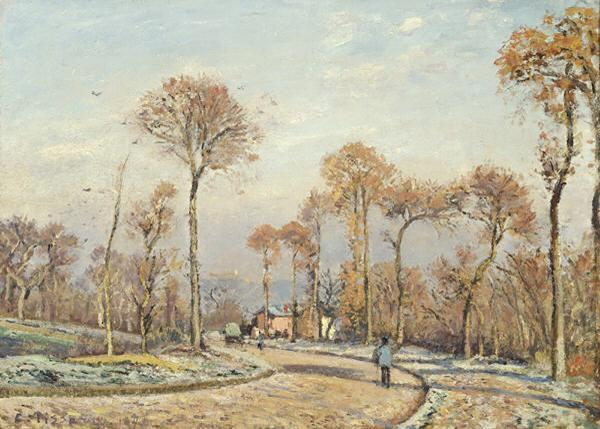
Camille Pissarro, The Road to Versailles, Louveciennes: Morning Frost, 1871

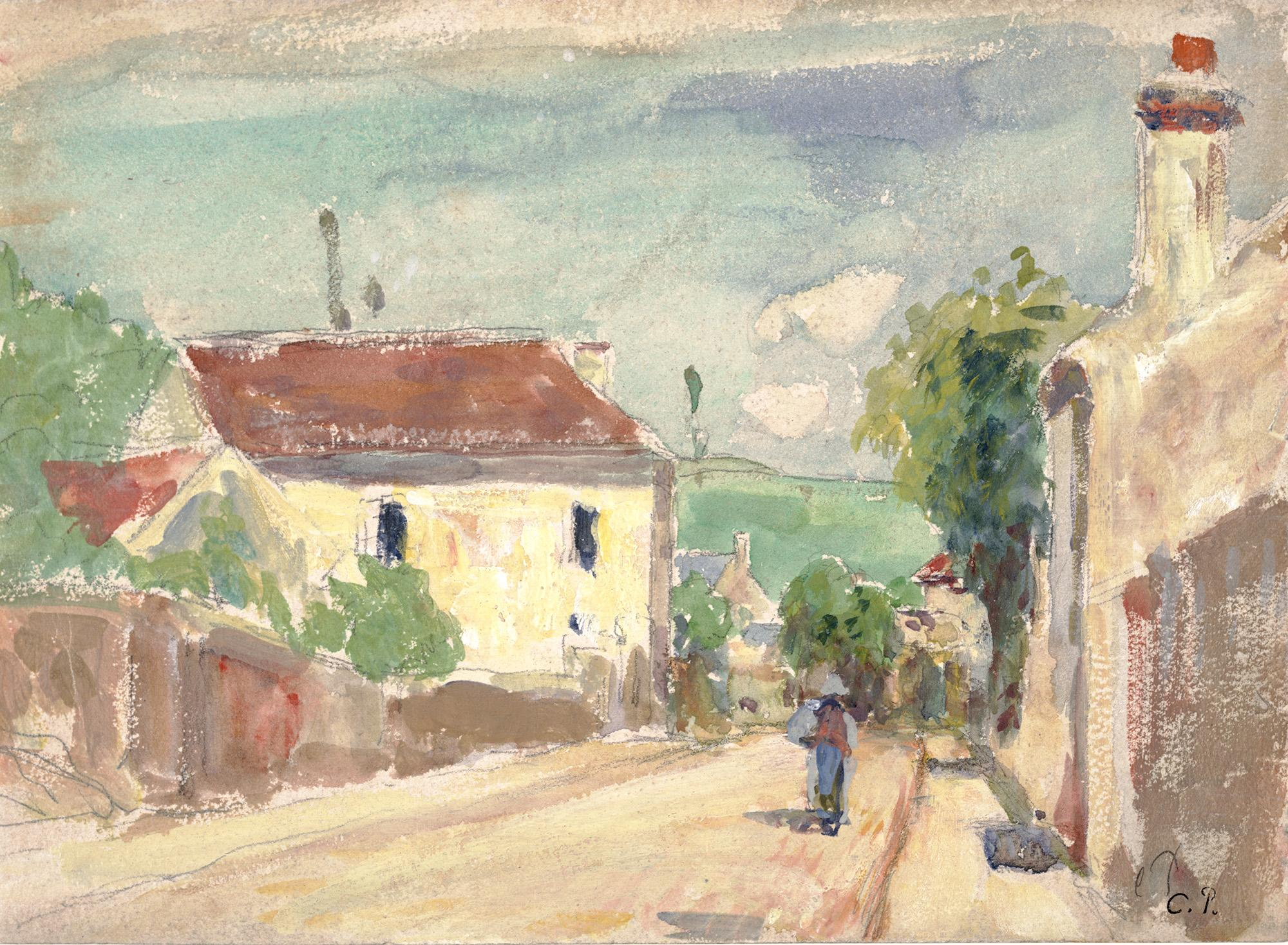
Camille Pissarro, La Rue de l'Hermitage, Pontoise, 1873–1875

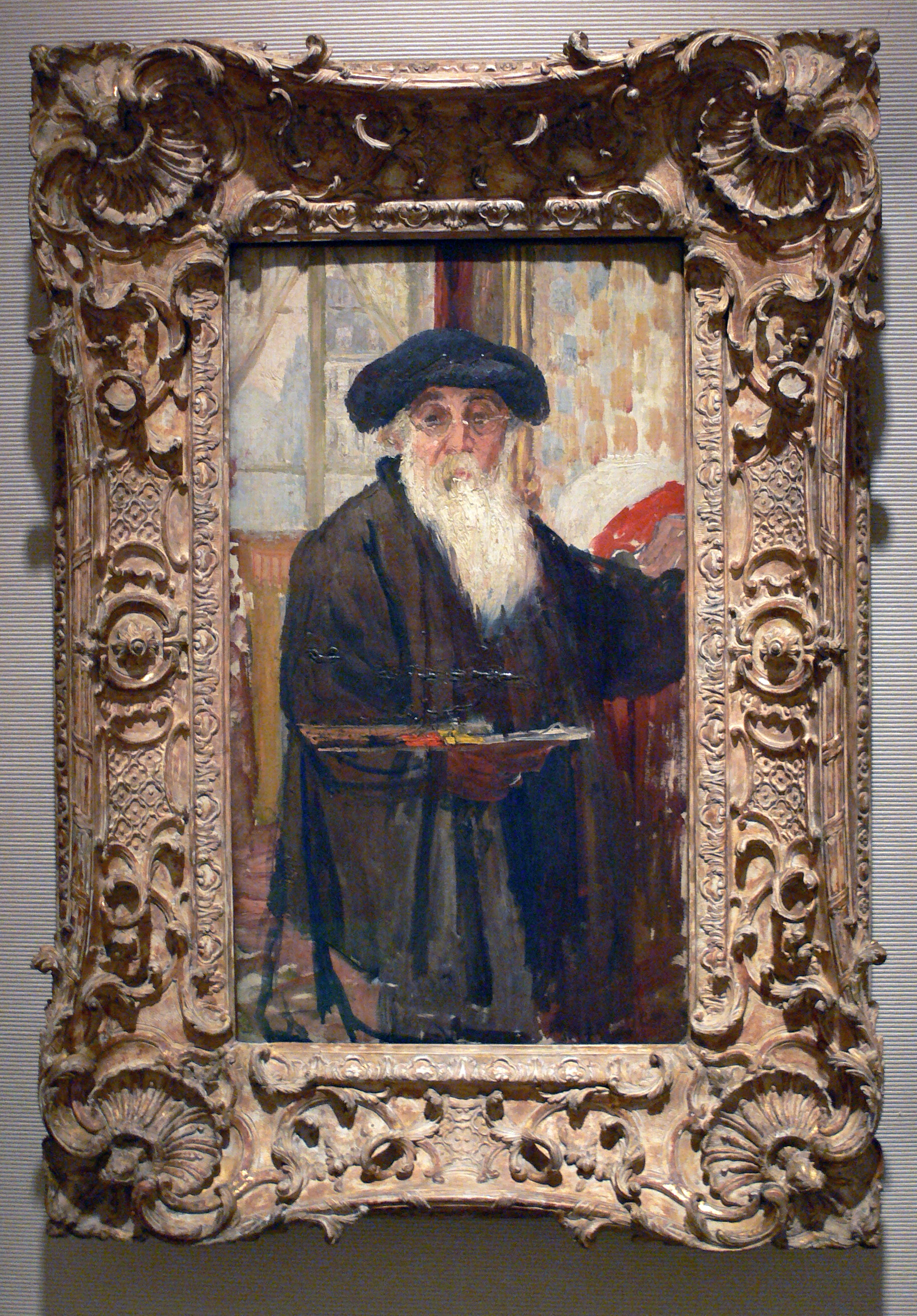
Camille Pissarro, Self-portrait, 1897–1898 (In frame)

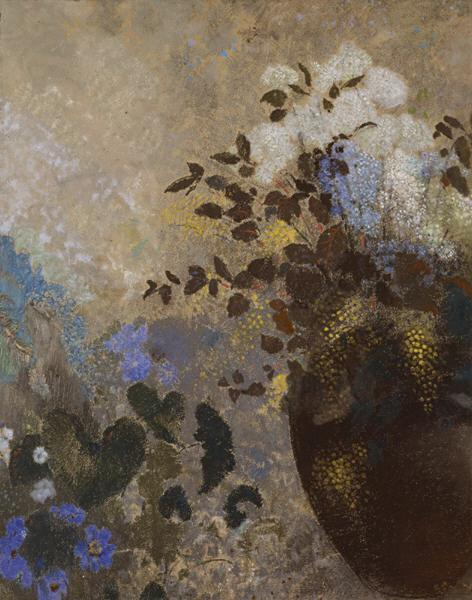
Odilon Redon, Flowers in a Black Vase, c.1909-1910

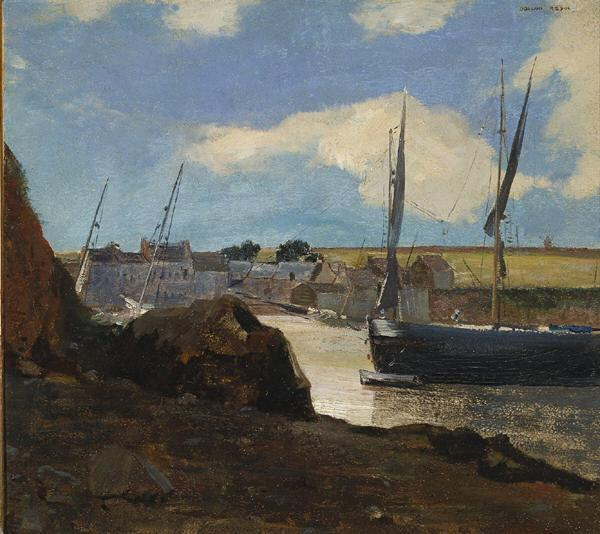
Odilon Redon, The Port of Morgat, 1882

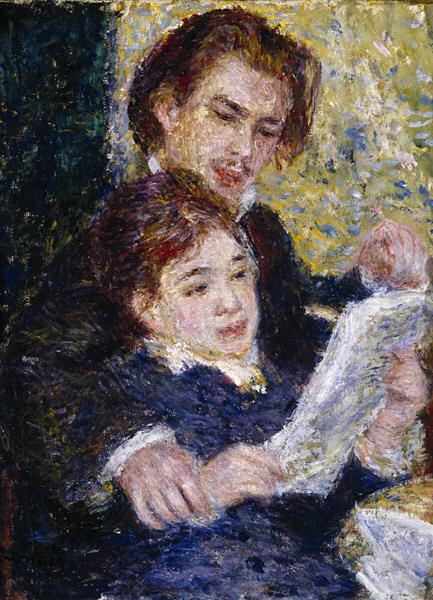
Pierre-Auguste Renoir, In the Studio (Georges Riviere and Marguerite Legrand), 1876–1877

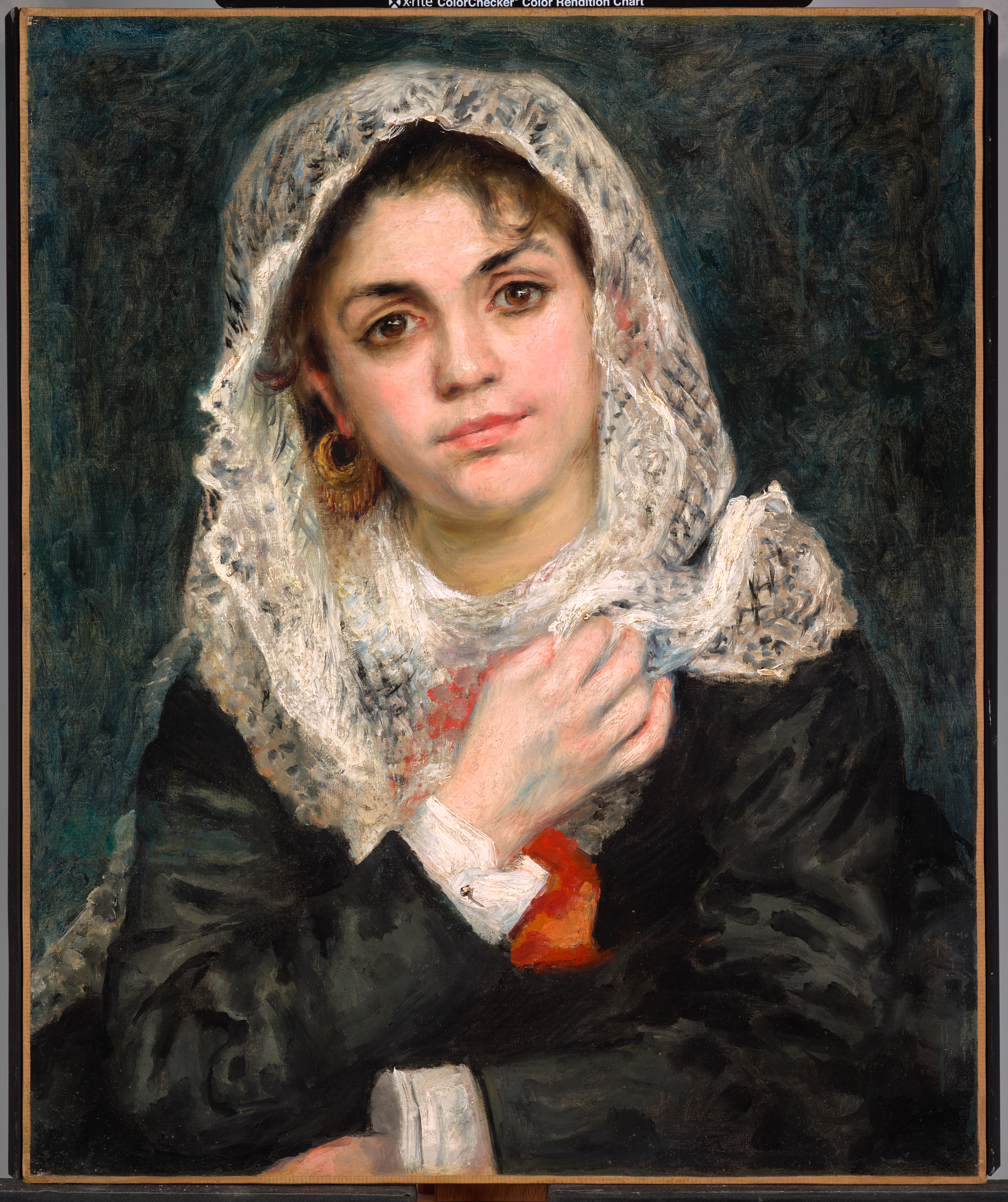
Pierre-Auguste Renoir, Lise in a White Shawl, 1871–1872

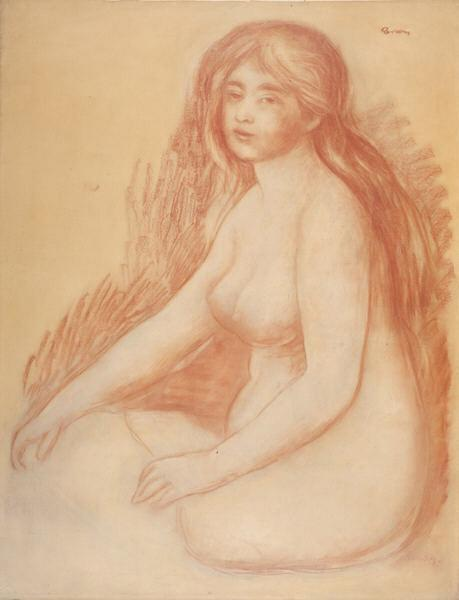
Pierre-Auguste Renoir, The Bather, 1880–1881

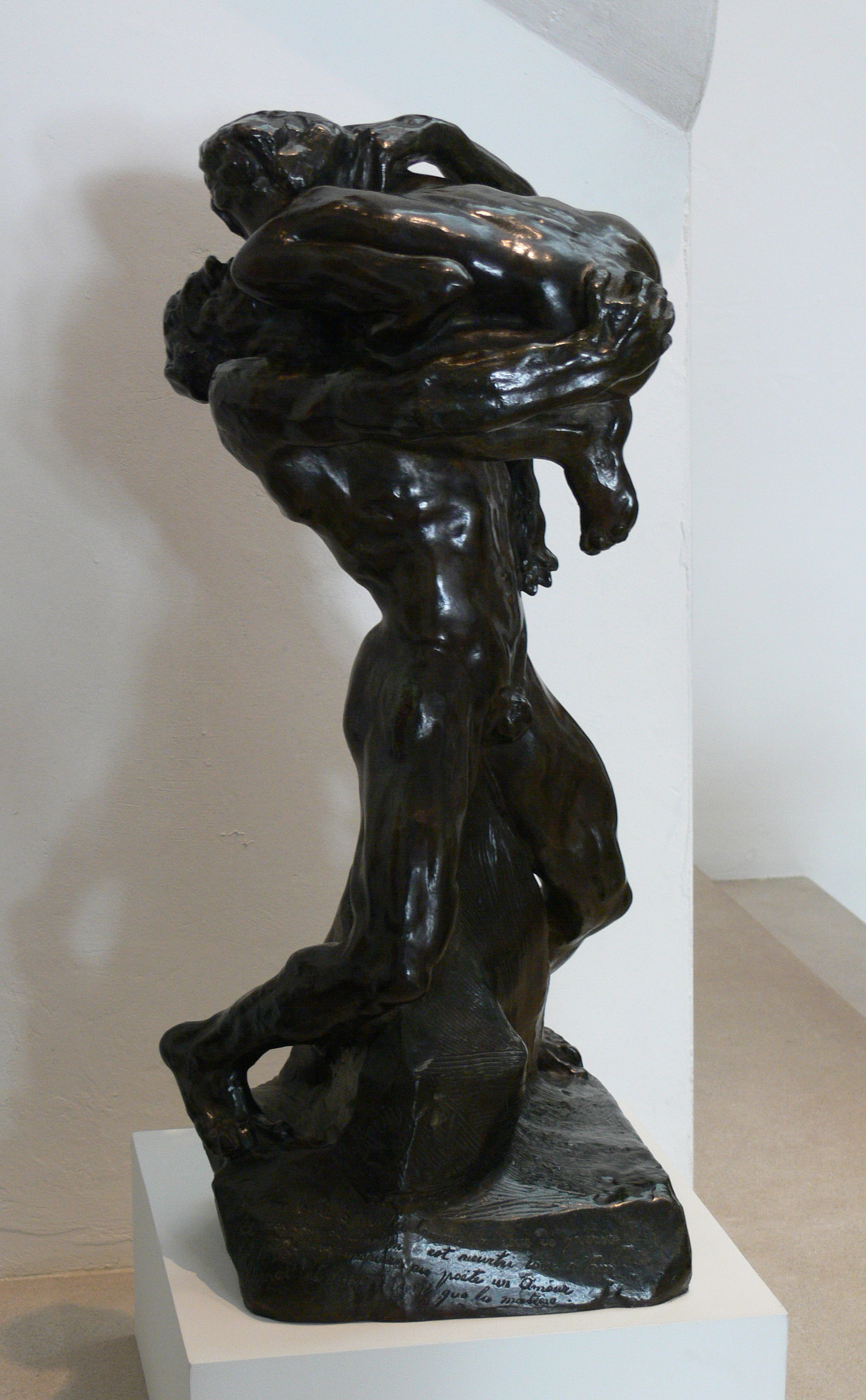
Auguste Rodin, I Am Beautiful, 1882

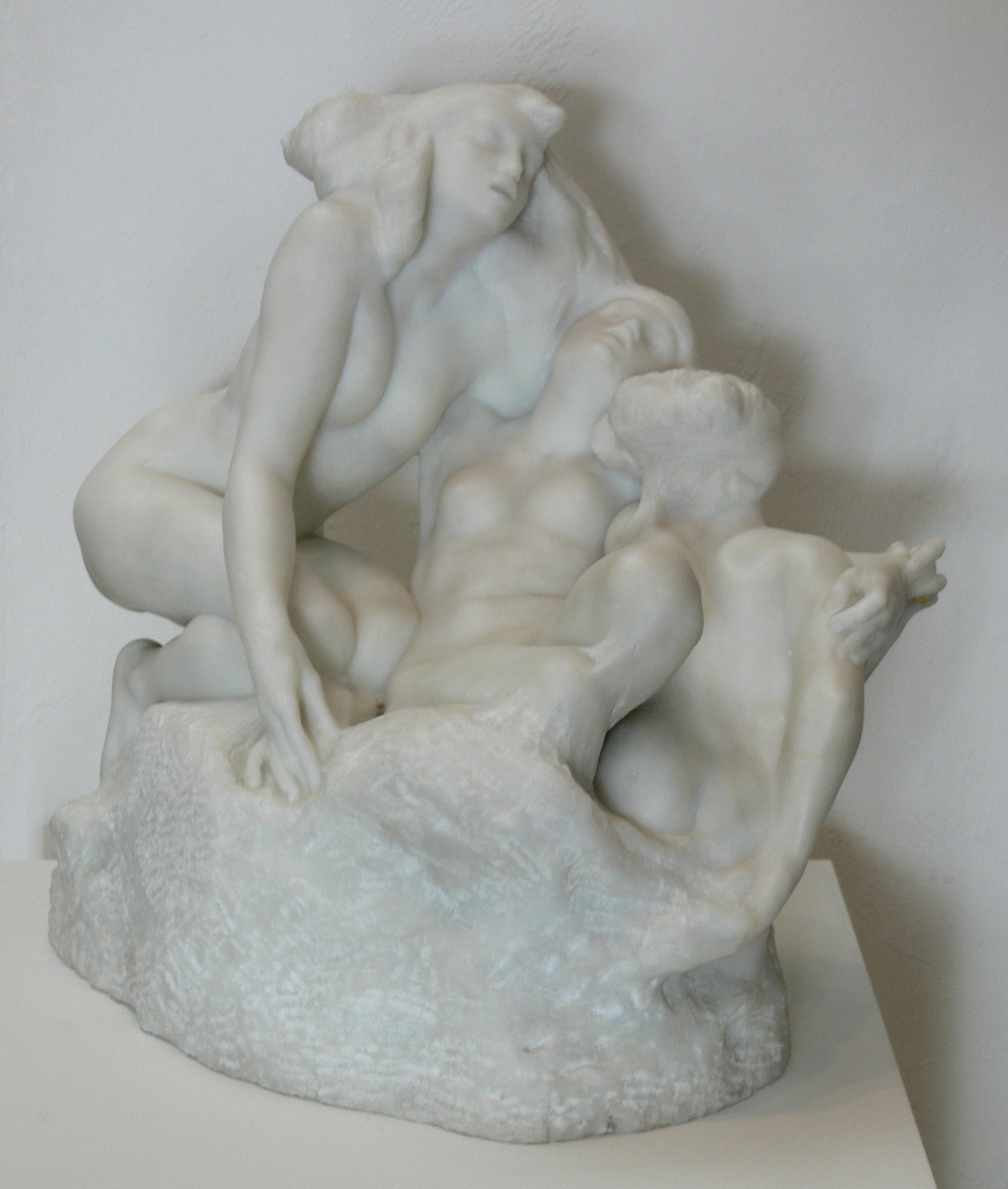
Auguste Rodin, The Sirens, 1888

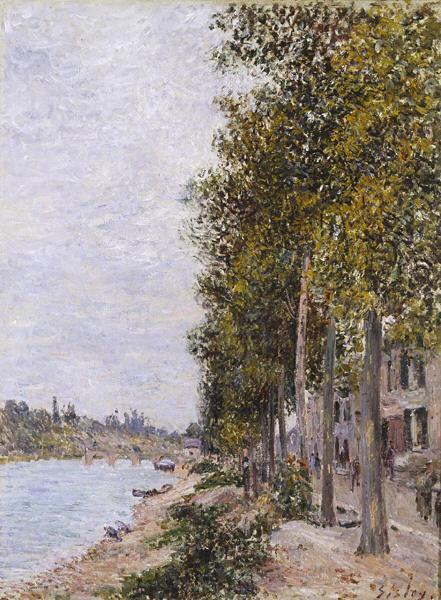
Alfred Sisley, Road Along the Seine at Saint-Mammes, c.1880

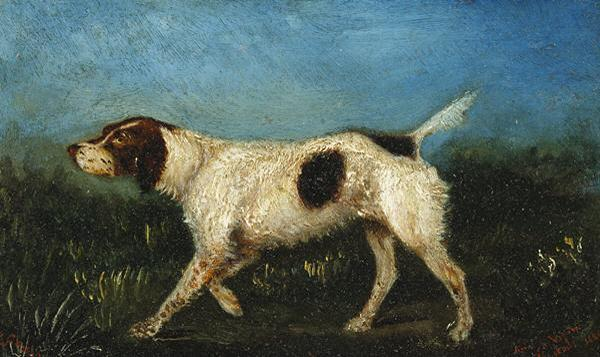
Henri de Toulouse-Lautrec, Dog, 1880

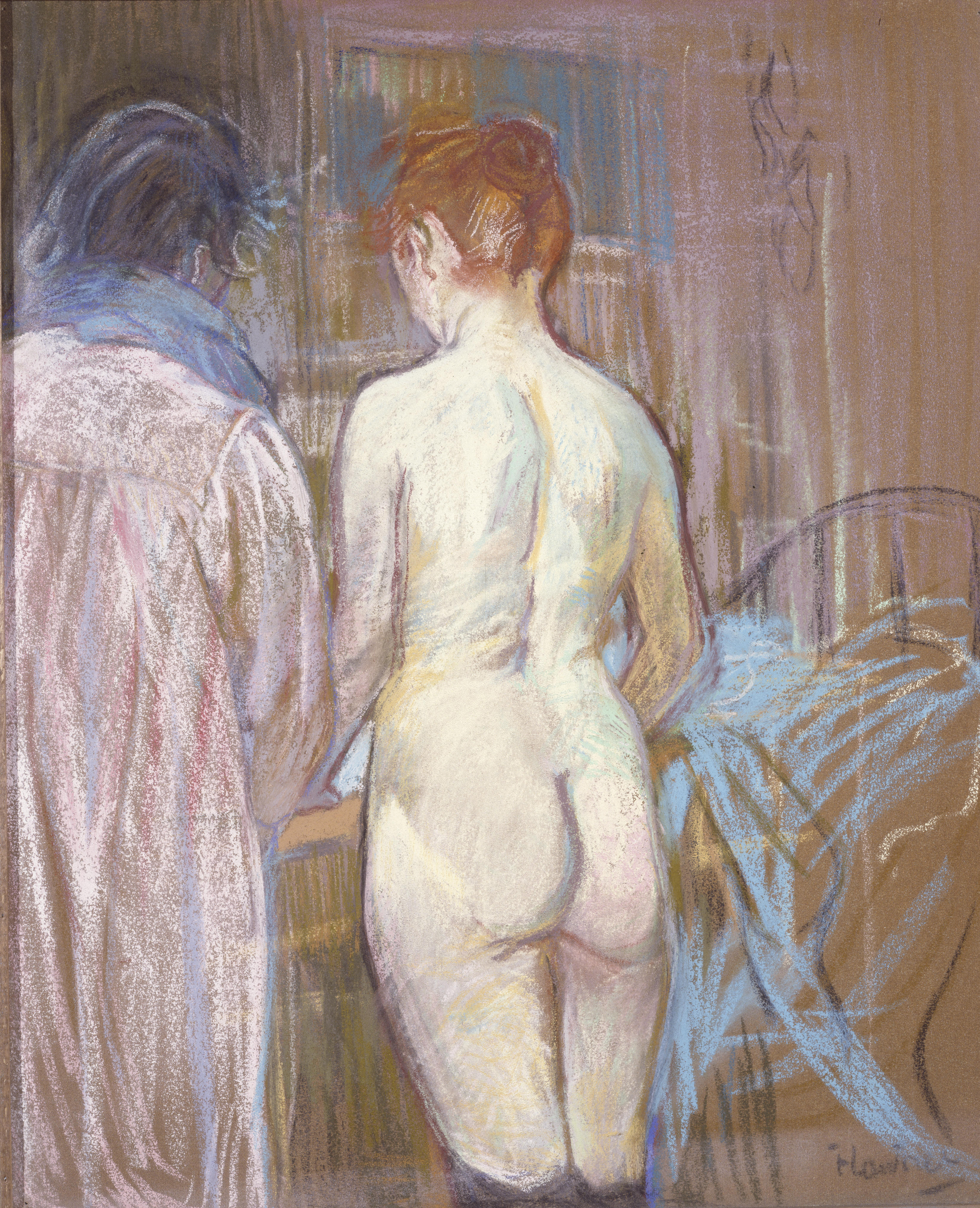
Henri de Toulouse-Lautrec, Prostitutes, 1893–1895

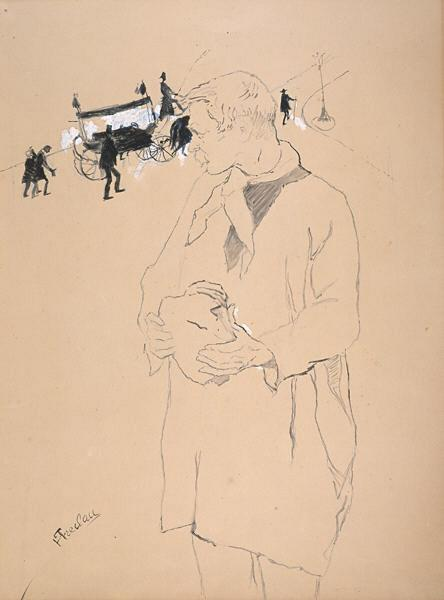
Henri de Toulouse-Lautrec, The Last Respects, 1887

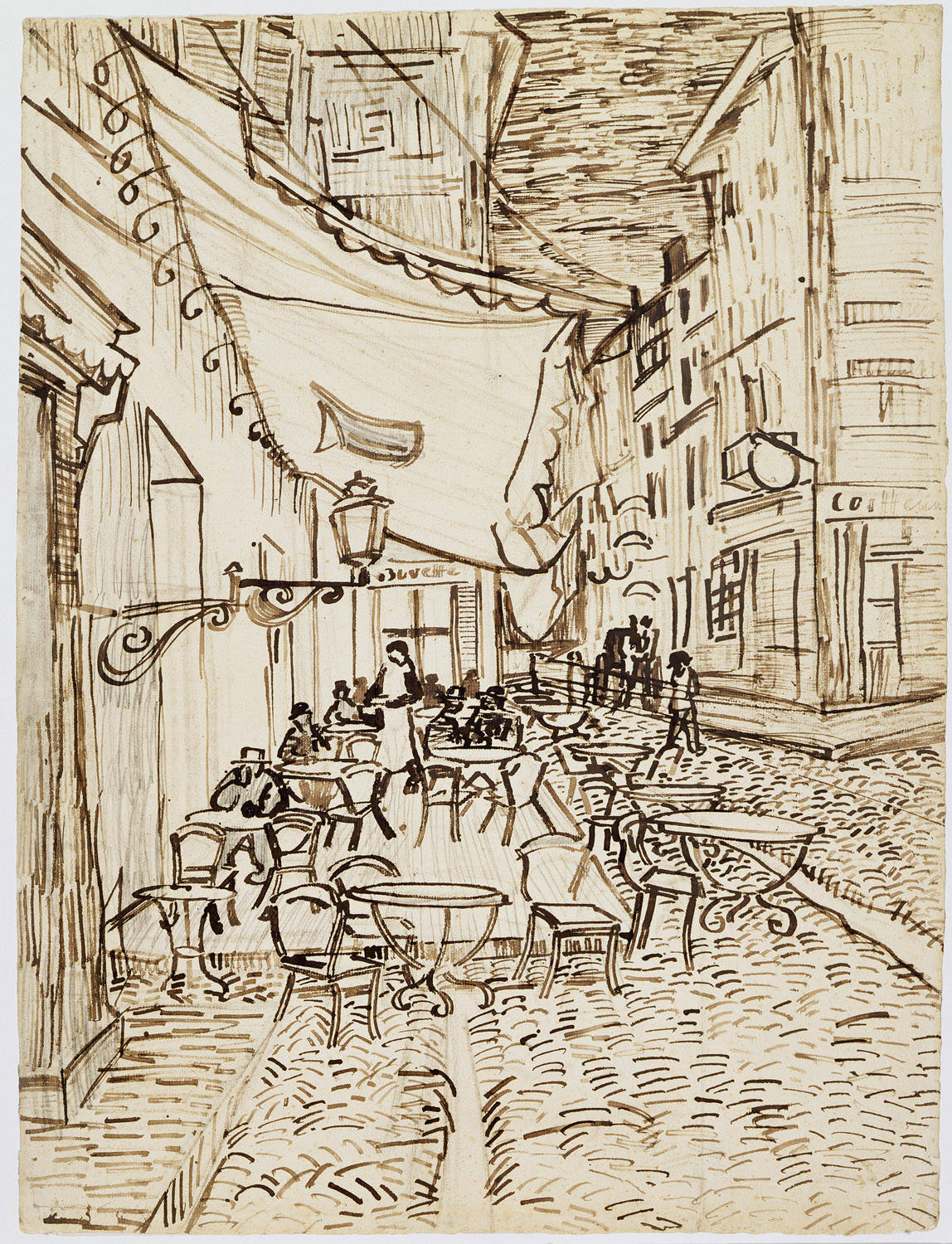
Vincent van Gogh, Café Terrace at Night, 1888

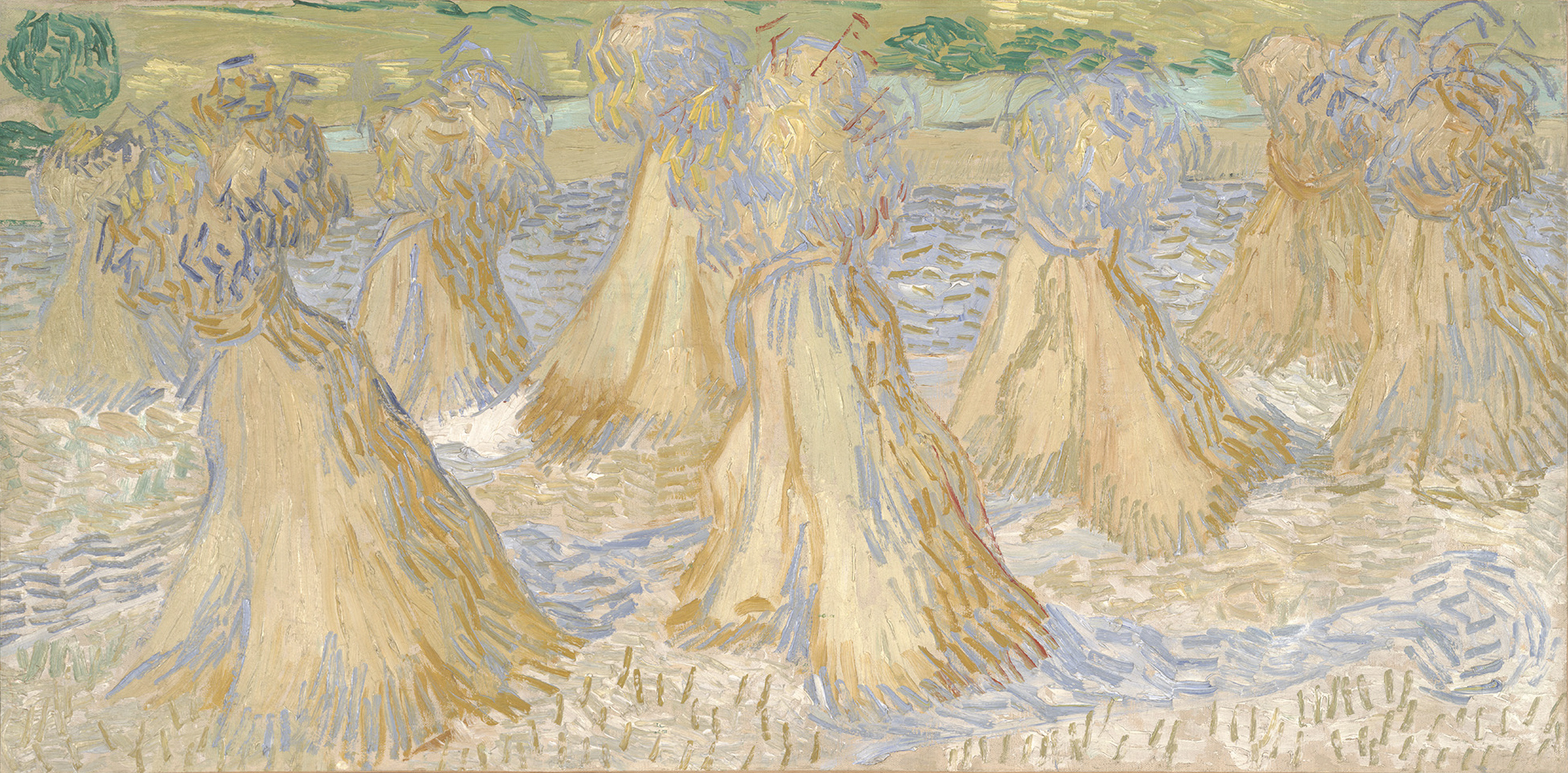
Vincent van Gogh, Sheaves of Wheat, July 1890

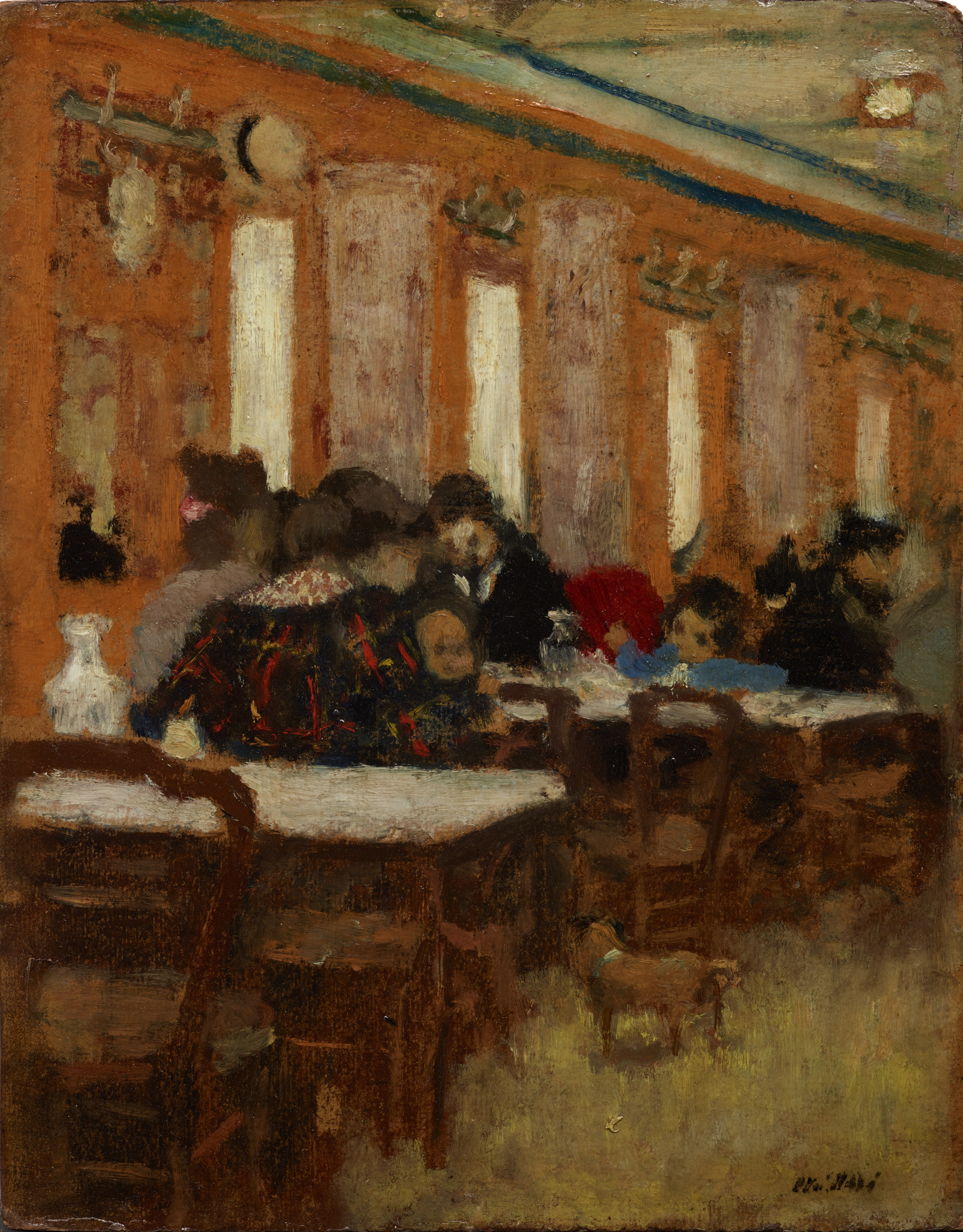
Édouard Vuillard, The Little Restaurant, 1894

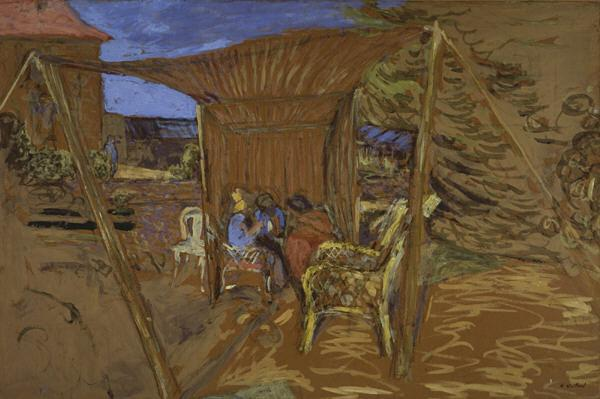
Édouard Vuillard, The Tent, 1908

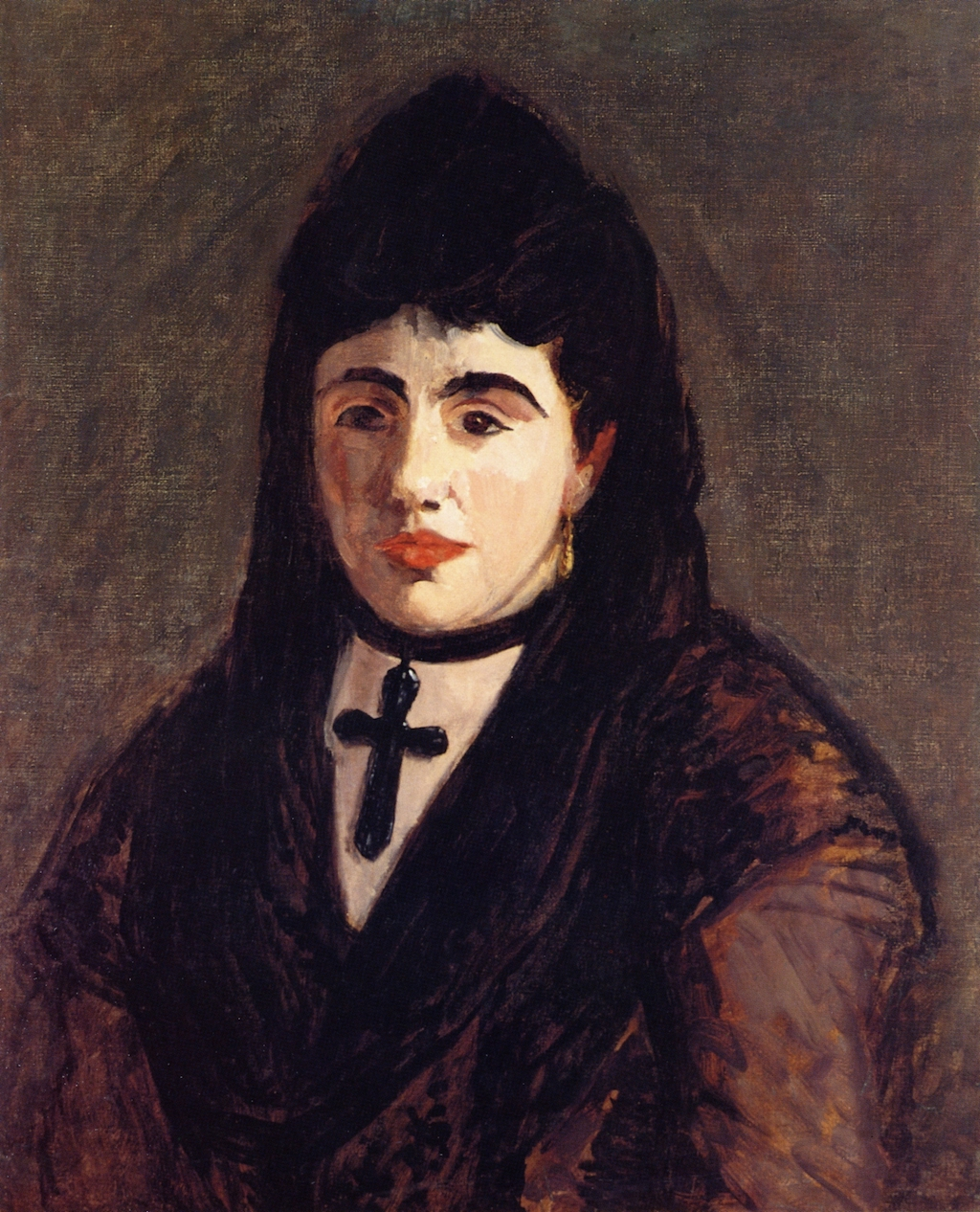
Édouard Manet, Espagnole à la Croix Noire, c.1863

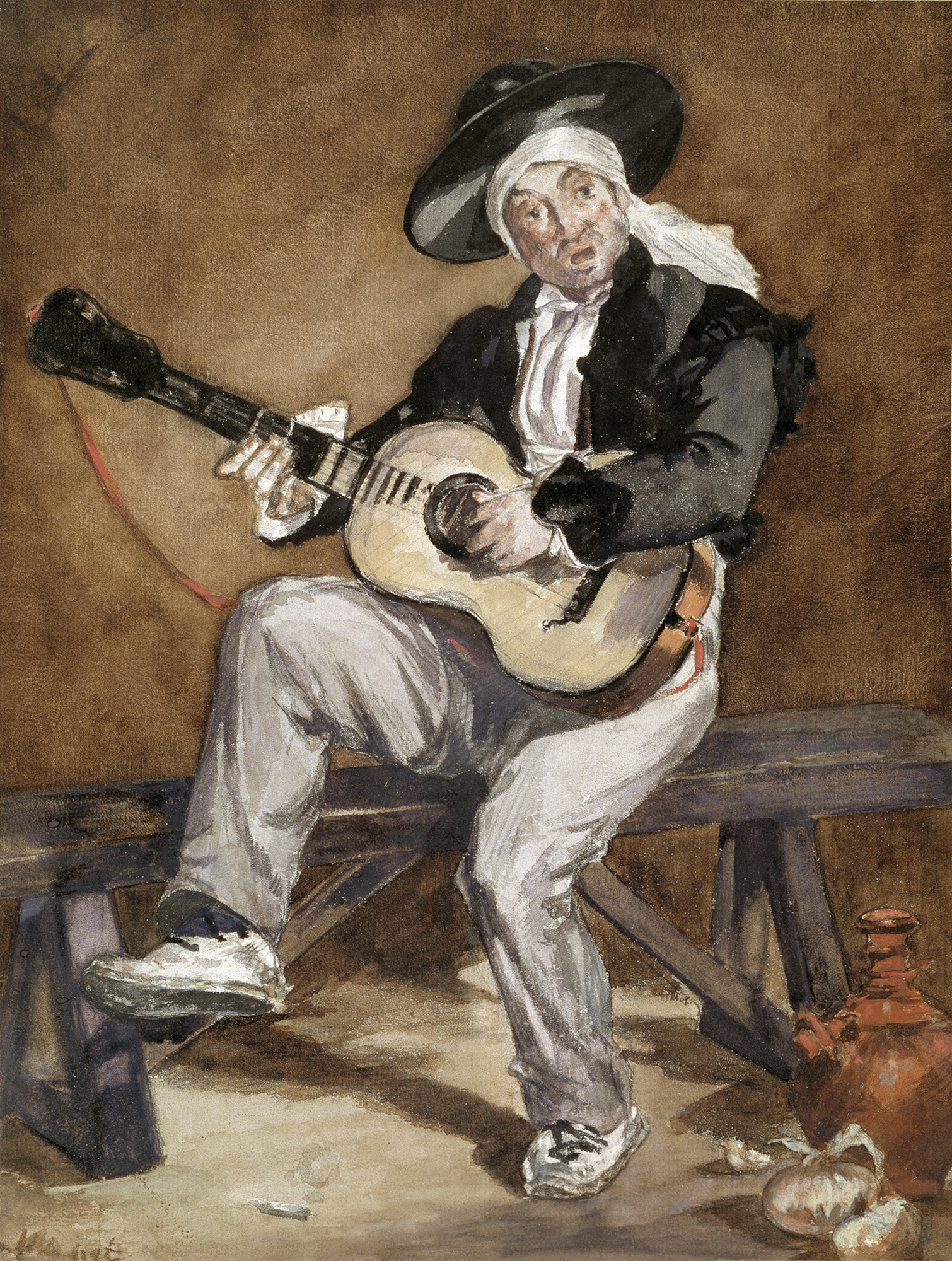
Édouard Manet, The Spanish Singer, 1891

== Bibliography ==
- Chaney, Lisa (2011). Coco Chanel: An Intimate Life. Penguin. ISBN 978-0-14-103685-4.
- Cosgrave, Bronwyn (2013). Vogue on Coco Chanel. Quadrille. ISBN 978-1-84949-111-2.
- Picardie, Justine (2010). Coco Chanel: The Legend and the Life. Harper Collins. ISBN 978-0-00-731904-6.
- Smith, Nancy (2017). Churchill on the Riviera: Winston Churchill, Wendy Reves, and the Villa La Pausa built by Coco Chanel. Biblio Press. ISBN 978-1622493661.
- Meslay, Olivier (2015). From Chanel to Reves: La Pausa and its Collections at the Dallas Museum of Art. Dallas Museum of Art. ISBN 978-0936227306.
