= Leo Michelson =

French painter

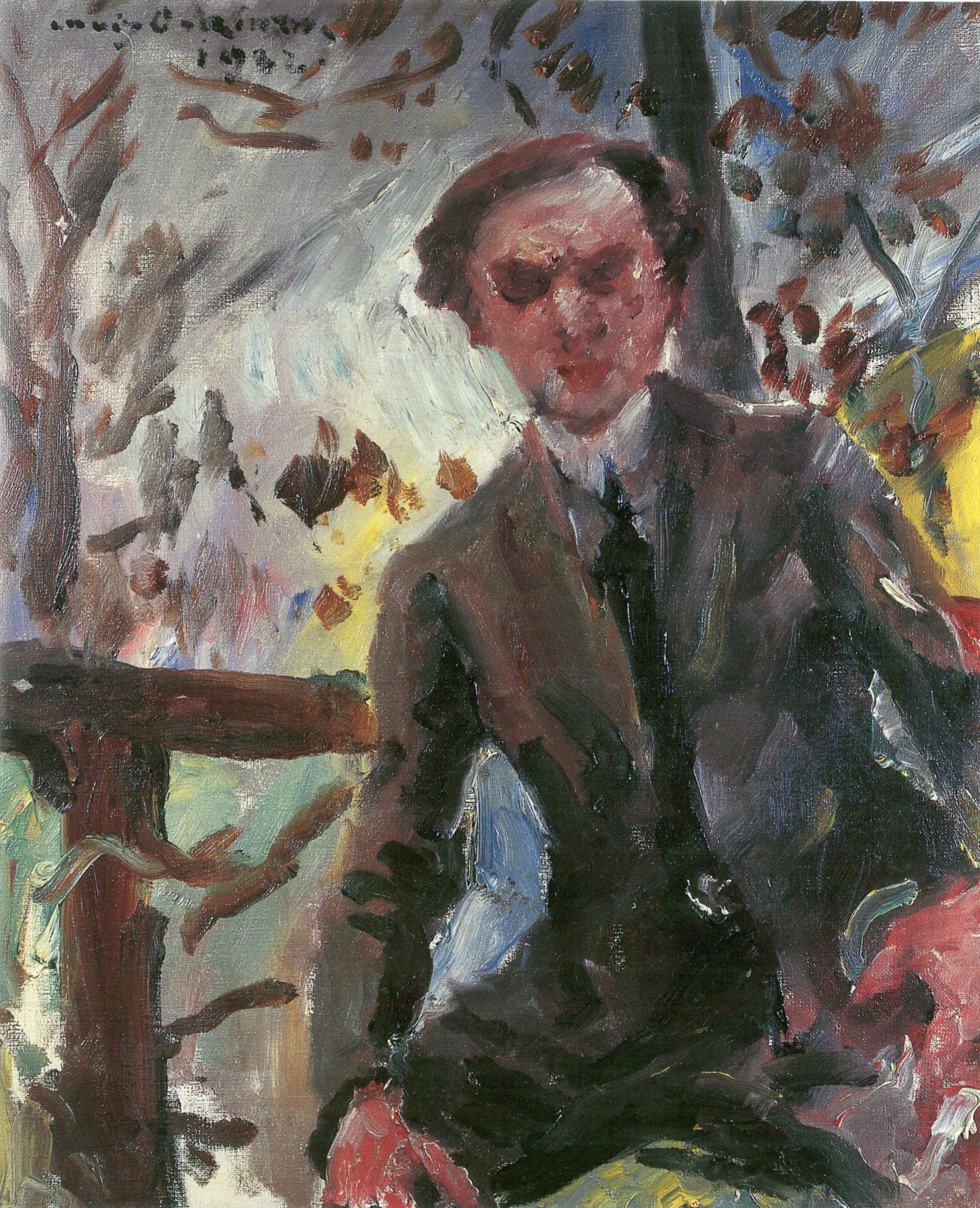
Leo Michelson

Leo Michelson (Latvian: Leo Mihelsons; 12 May 1887 – 10 April 1978) was a Latvian-American artist considered part of the École de Paris, although his works span many periods and styles.

== Biography ==
Michelson was born in Riga, Latvia. He attended the Imperial Academy in St. Petersburg, Russia, and then the University of Tartu (then called the University of Dorpat) in Tartu, Russian Empire.

The Russian Revolution of 1917 forced Michelson to leave Russia for Munich, Germany, where he participated in the beginnings of German Expressionism.

By 1920 Michelson was living in Paris and had established an international reputation for his paintings, prints, and sculptures. As a prominent member of the Paris School his works were shown in major exhibits throughout Western Europe, the Soviet Union, and the United States. After the fall of Paris to Nazi Germany in 1939, Michelson fled to New York City, where he spent the rest of his life.

Michelson is described as an "eternal emigrant, eternal student" because he was always studying and experimenting with new styles. Michelson actually carried crayons with him so he could sketch where ever he was. Art historians have compared Michelson to both Chagall and Picasso, but it was Titian who Michelson said was his inspiration.

Michelson painted over 1,000 paintings. He died on 10 April 1978. His widow, Janine, selected Marshall, Texas, as the permanent home for her late husband's works. in what is known as the Michelson Museum of Art
