= Warsaw =

Capital and largest city of Poland

Warsaw Warszawa (Polish)
- Capital city and county
- Capital City of Warsaw; Miasto stołeczne Warszawa
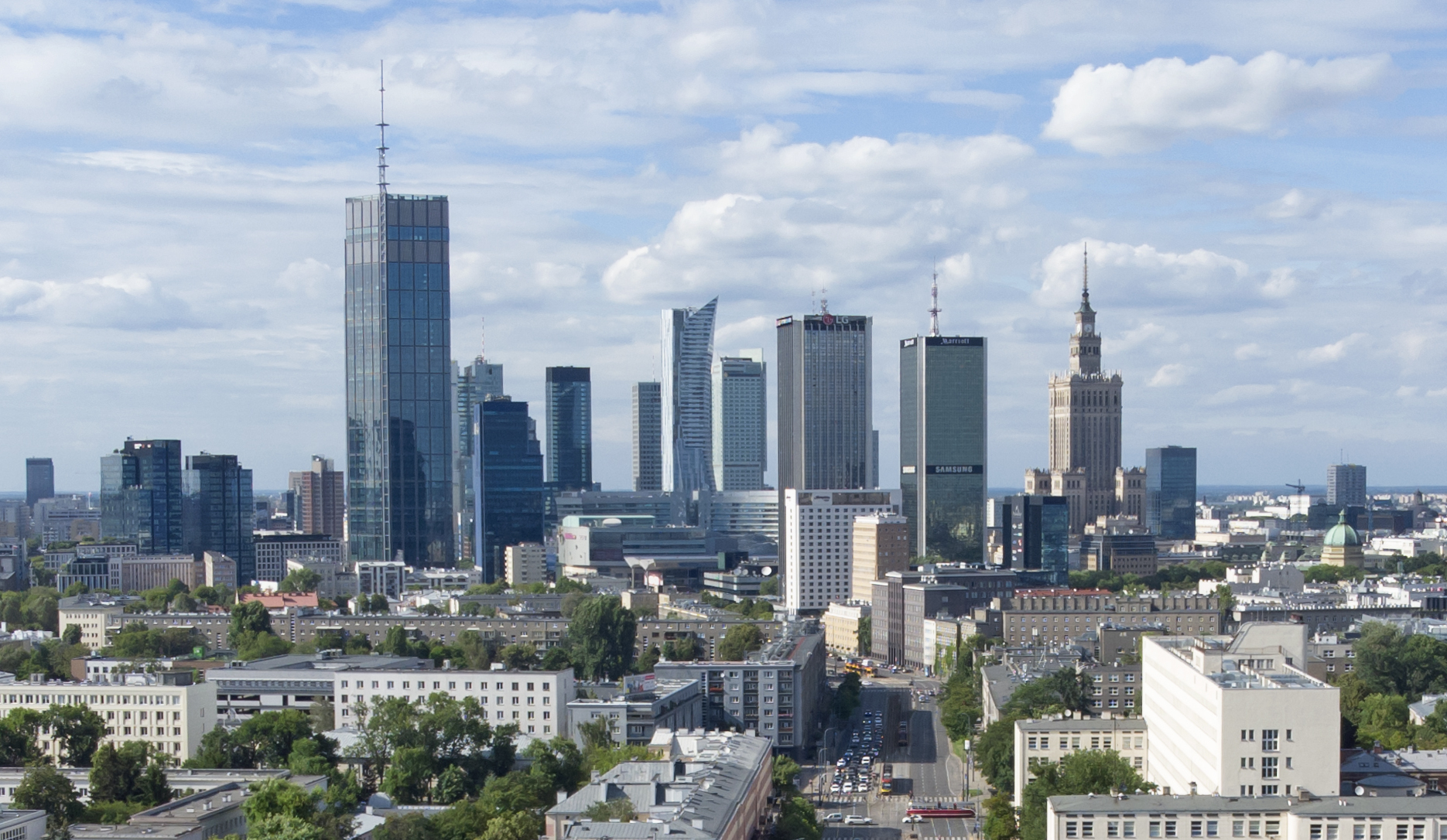
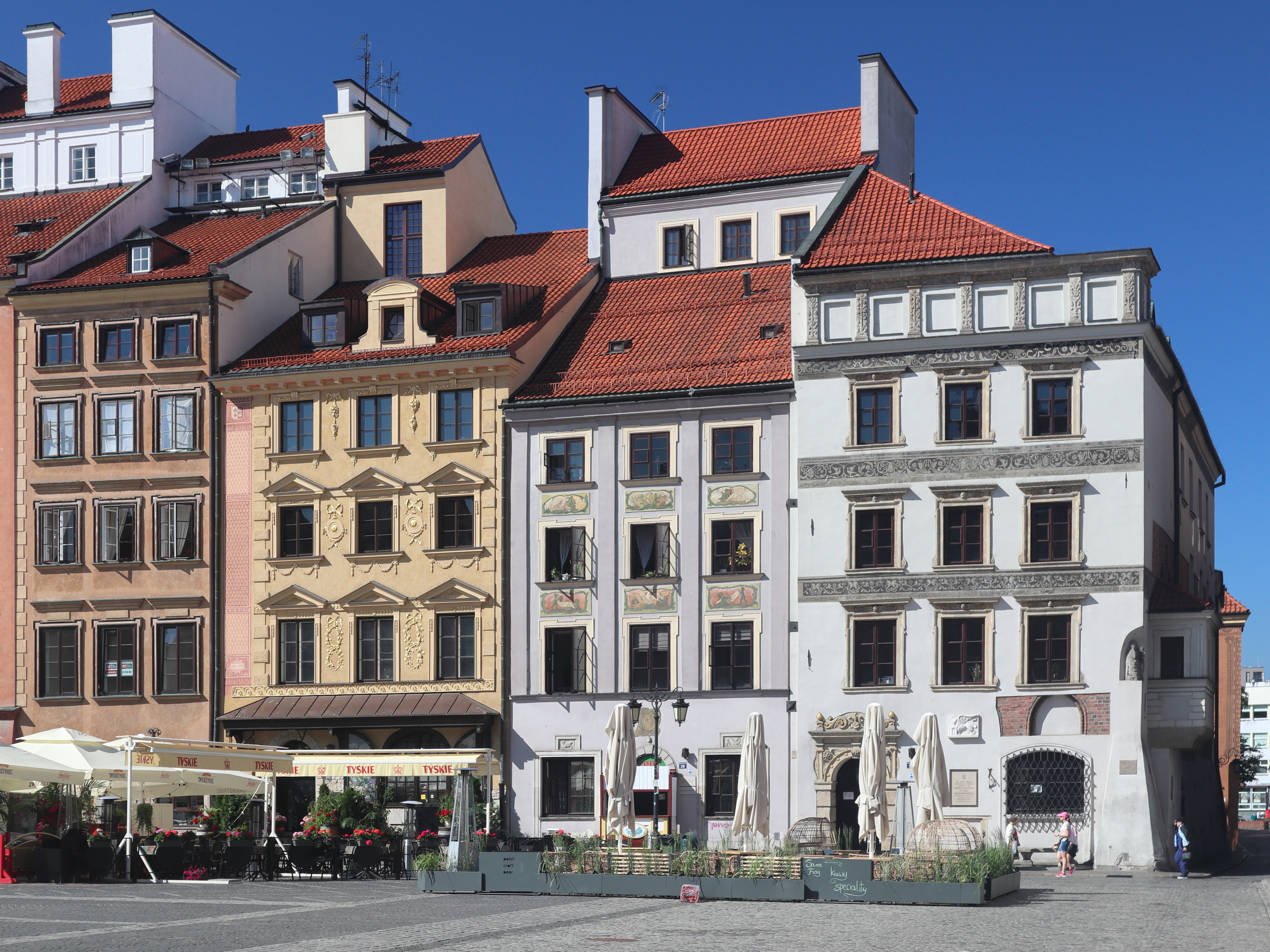
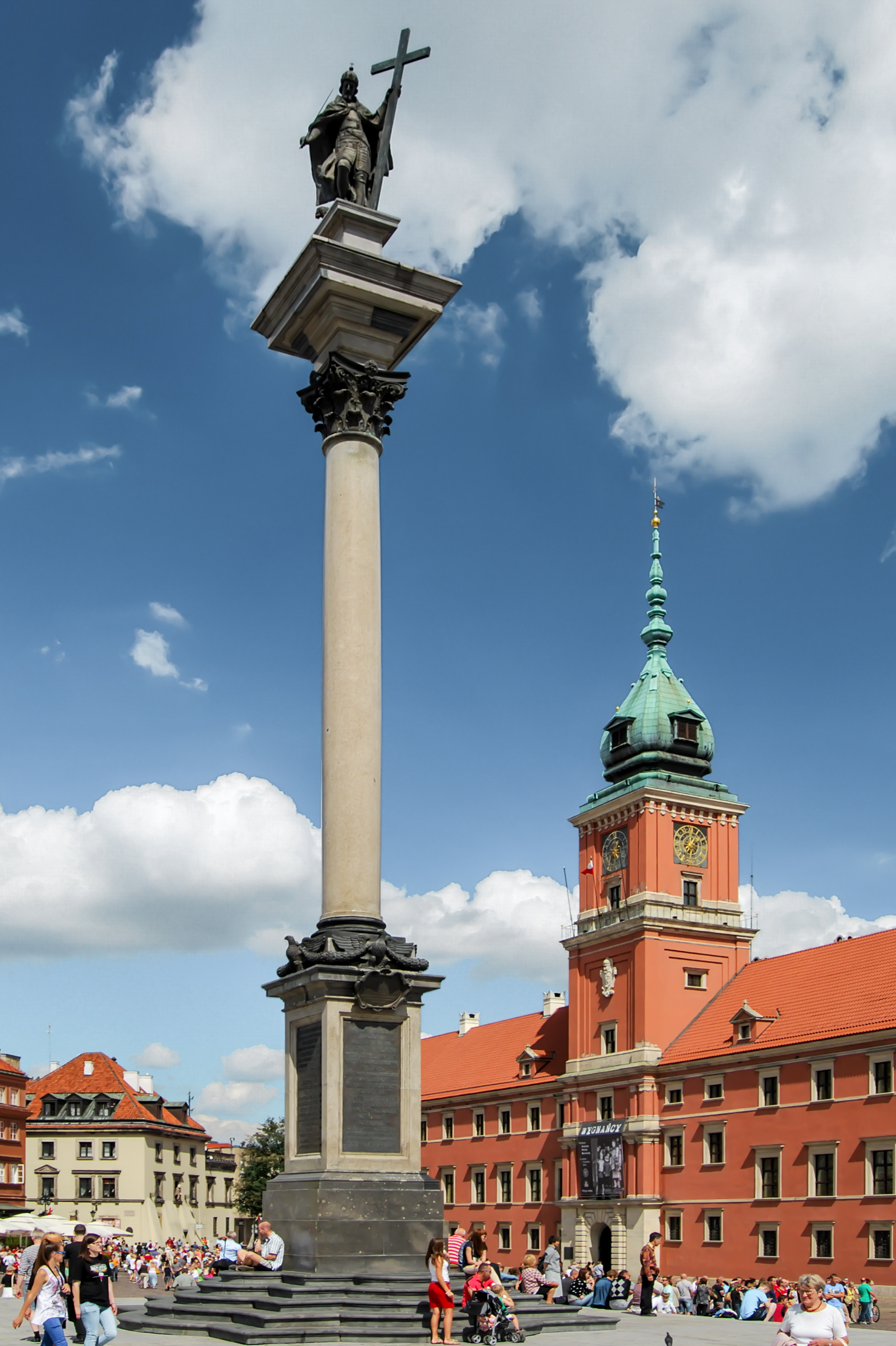
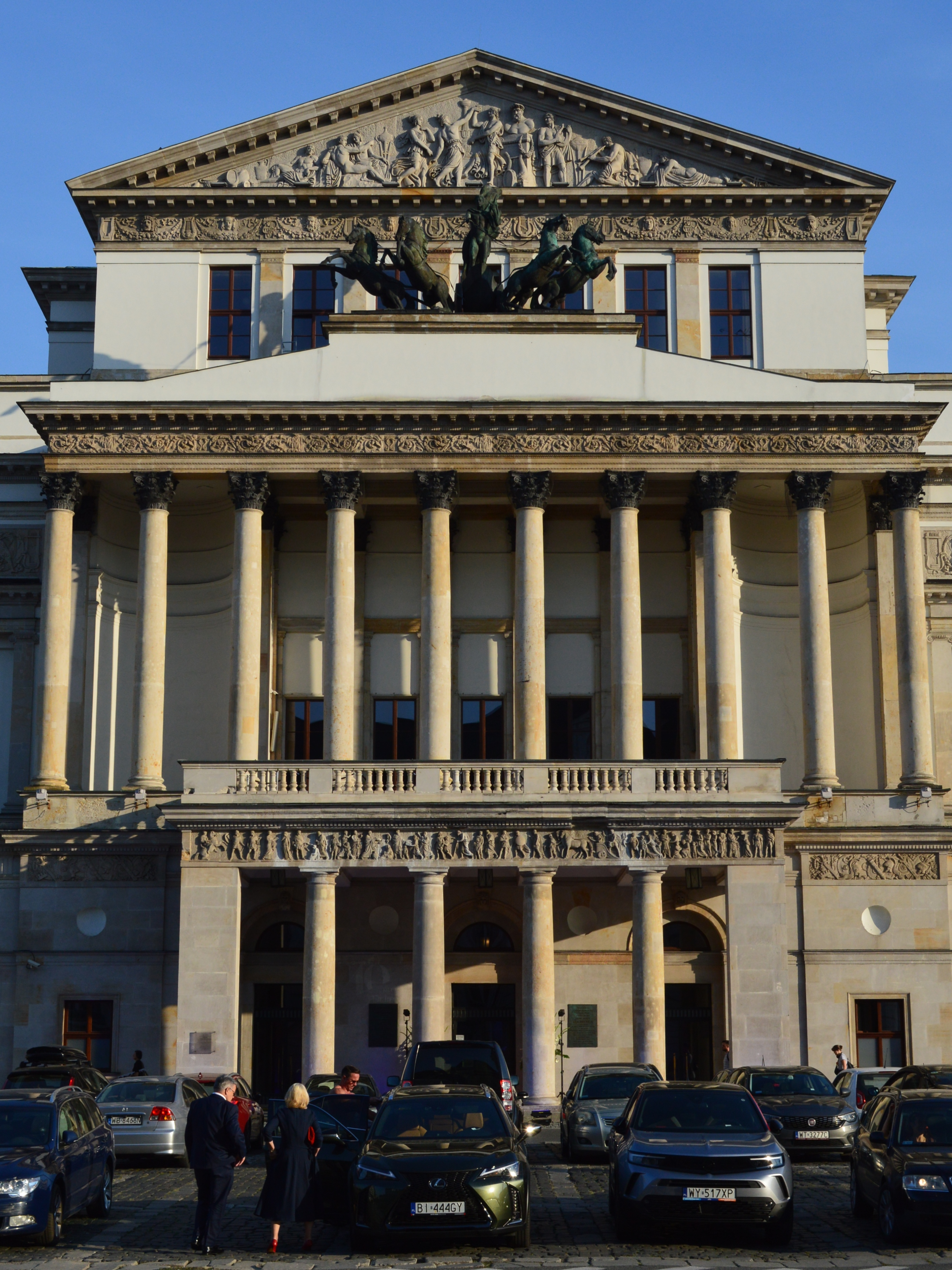
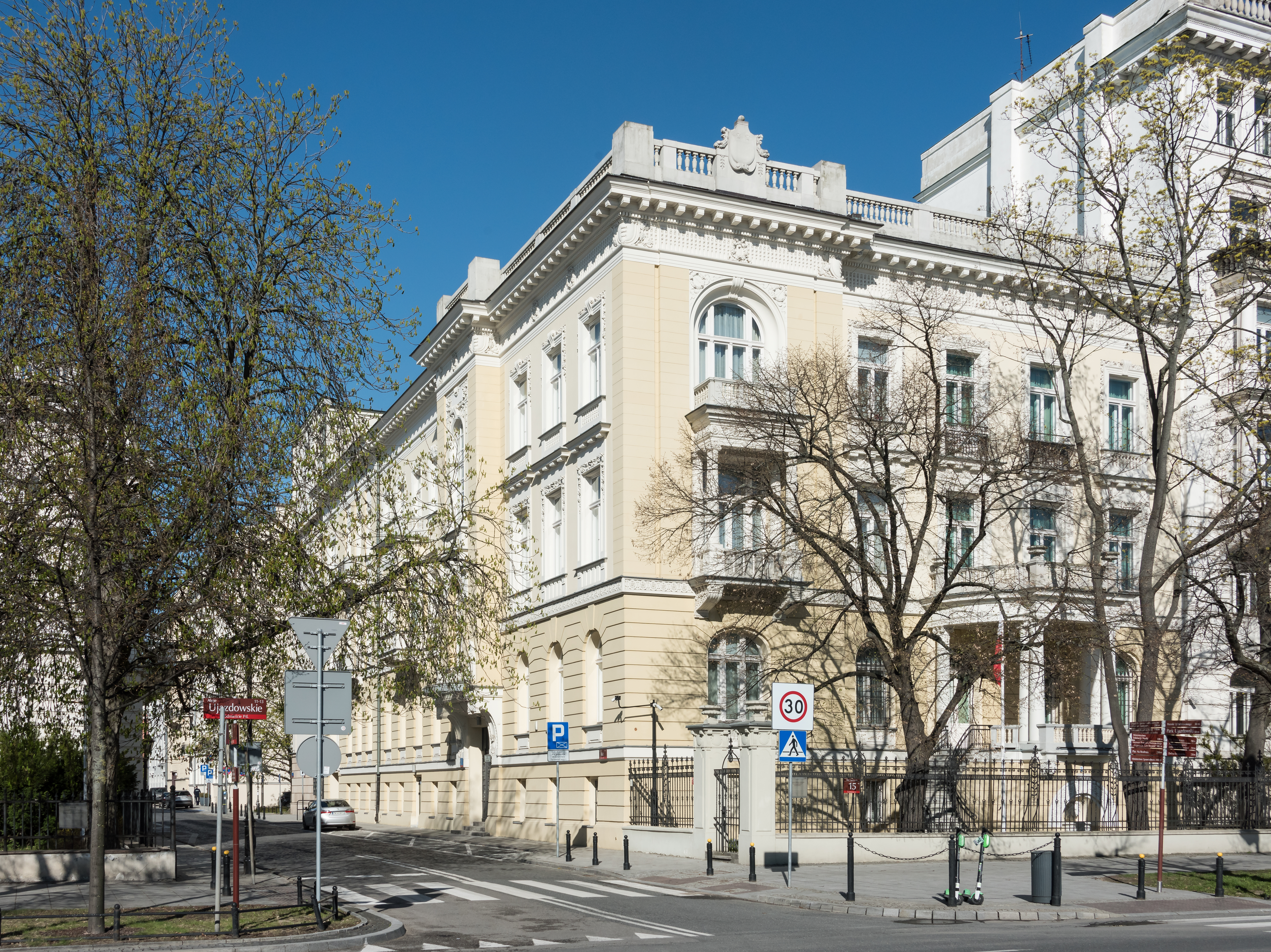
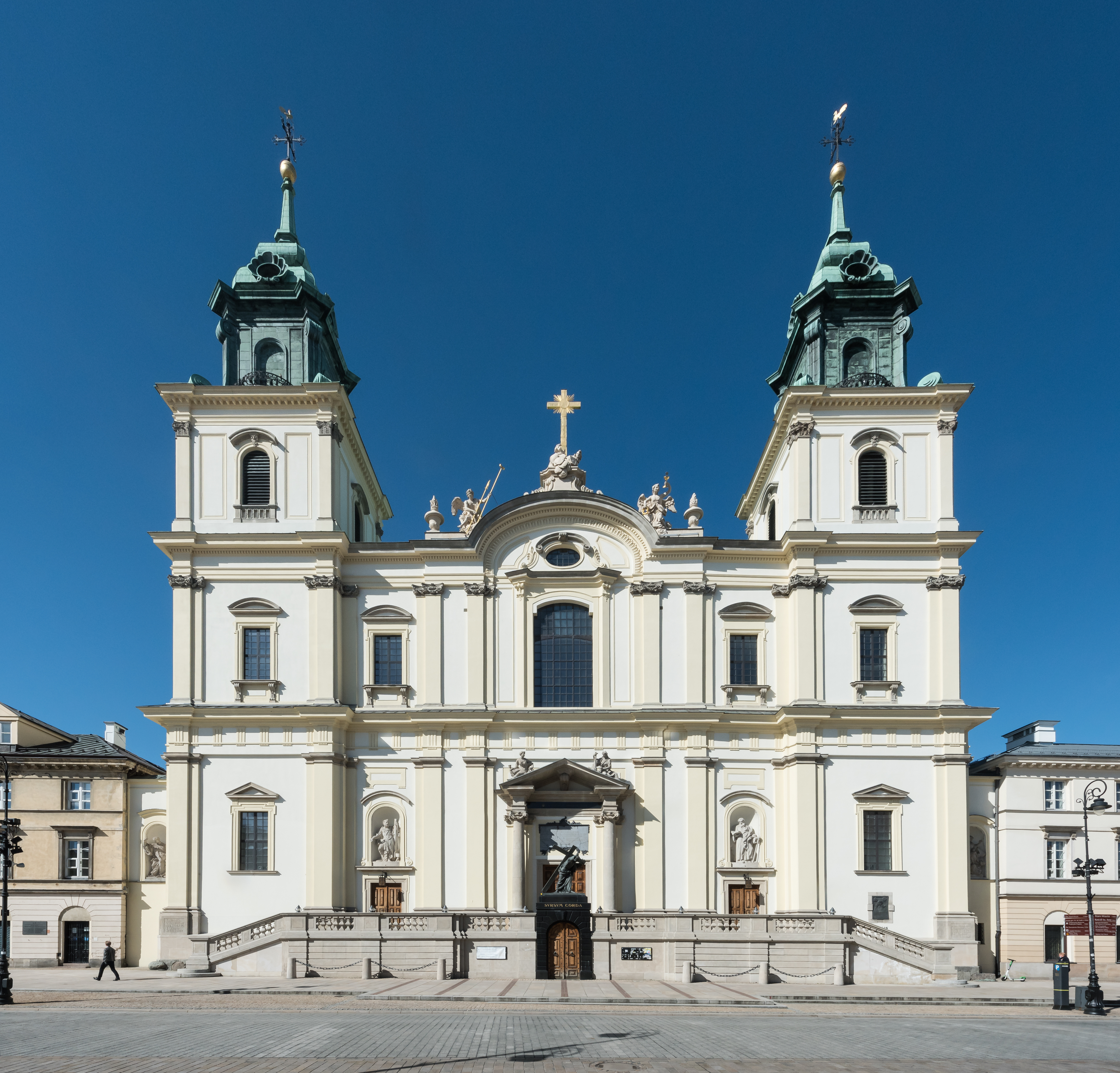
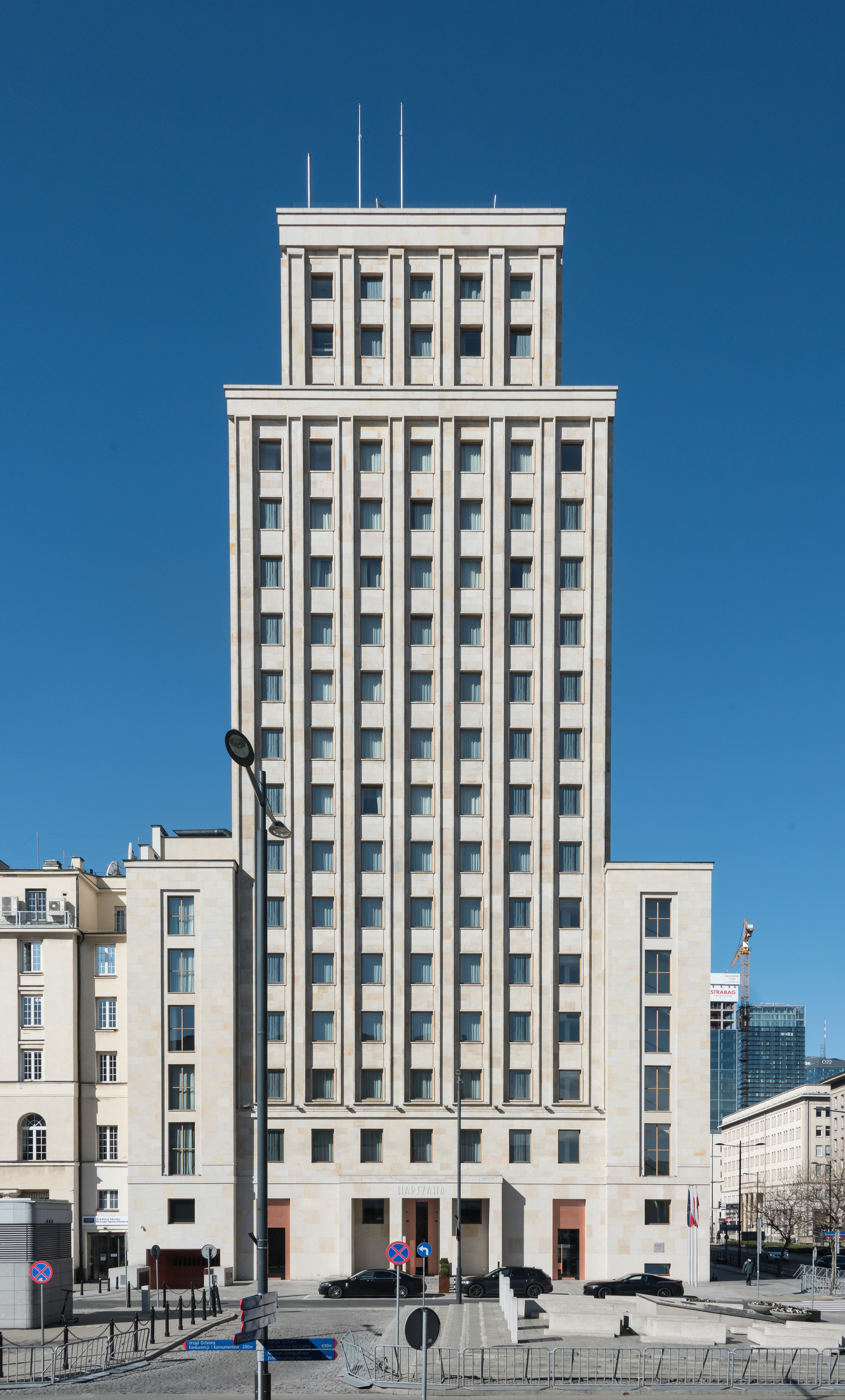
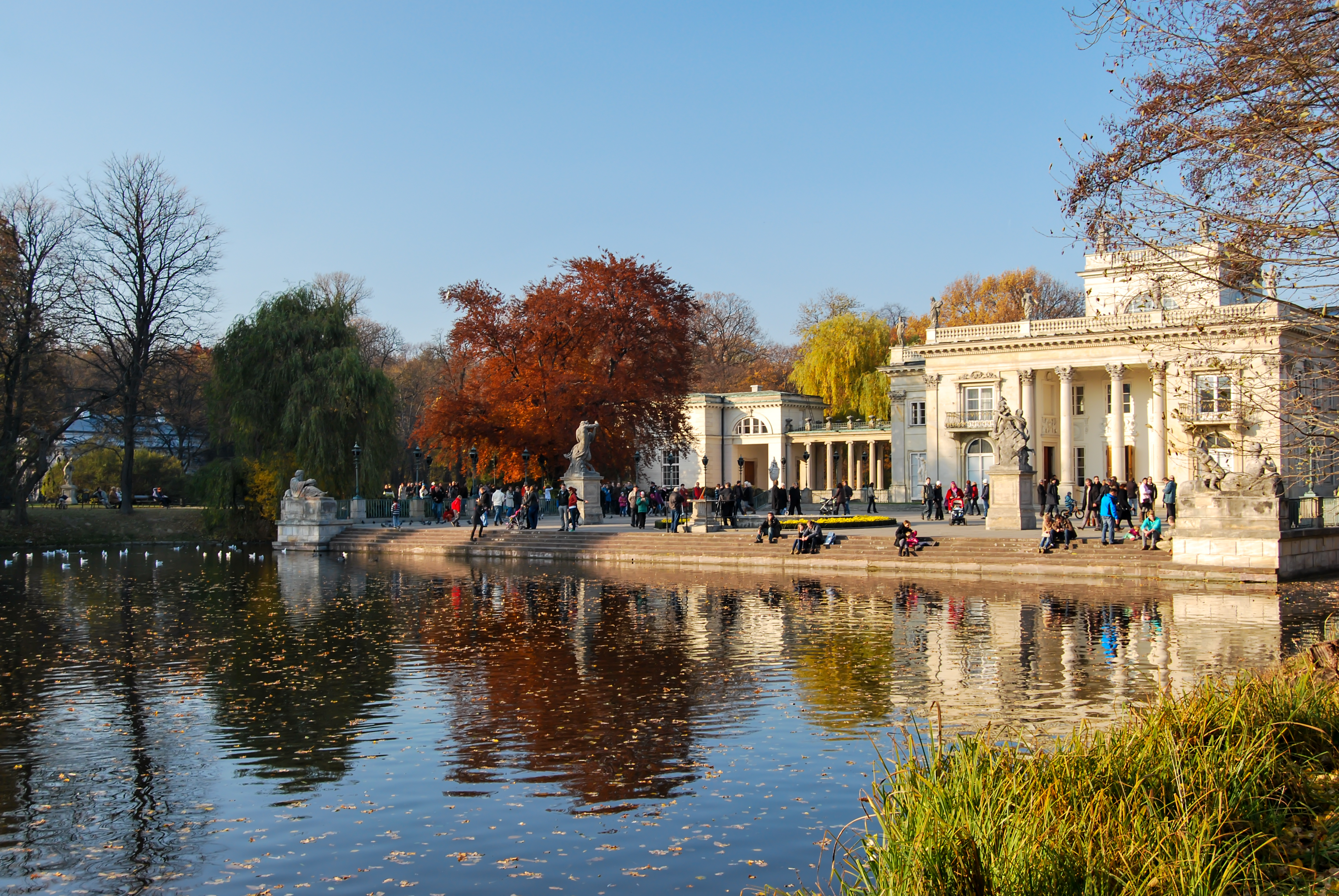
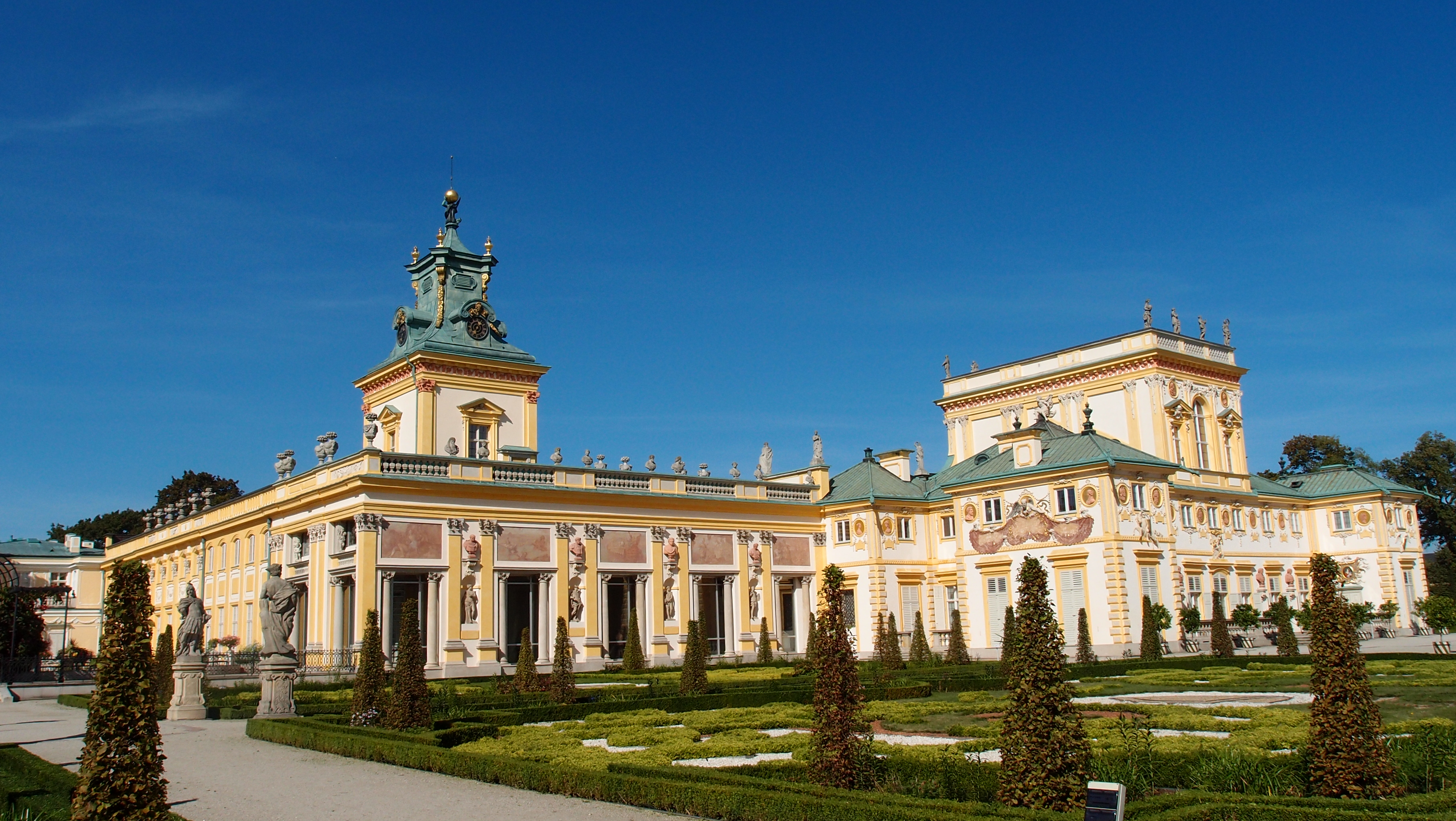
- Skyline with Varso (left) and the Palace of Culture and Science (right) Old Town Market Square Royal Castle Grand Theatre Ujazdów Avenue Holy Cross Church Prudential House Łazienki Park Wilanów Palace

- Flag Coat of arms Brandmark
- Nicknames: Phoenix City, Paris of the North, (Note: historically) Wawa
- Motto: Semper invicta (Latin "Ever invincible")
- Interactive map of Warsaw
- Location within Poland Location within Europe
- Coordinates: 52°13′48″N 21°00′40″E
- Country: Poland
- Voivodeship: Masovian
- County: City county
- Founded: 13th century
- City rights: 1300
- City hall: Palace of the Government Commission of Revenues and Treasury; Palace of the Minister of Treasury
- Subdivisions: 18 districts

Government
  - Type: Mayor–council government
  - Body: Warsaw City Council
  - Mayor: Rafał Trzaskowski (KO)
  - Sejm: 20 members
  - European Parliament: Warsaw constituency

Area
  - Capital city and county: 517.24 km^{2} (199.71 sq mi)
  - Urban: 546.00 km^{2} (210.81 sq mi)
  - Metro: 6,100.43 km^{2} (2,355.39 sq mi)
- Elevation: 78–116 m (256–381 ft)

Population (31 December 2025)
  - Capital city and county: ▲1,866,729
  - Rank: 1st in Poland; 7th in European Union
  - Density: 3,500/km^{2} (9,100/sq mi)
  - Urban: 2,028,000
  - Urban density: 3,714/km^{2} (9,620/sq mi)
  - Metro: 3,269,510
  - Metro density: 509.1/km^{2} (1,319/sq mi)
- Demonym: Varsovian

GDP (Nominal, 2023)
  - Capital city and county: €108.751 billion
  - Per capita: €58,393
- Time zone: UTC+01:00 (CET)
  - Summer (DST): UTC+02:00 (CEST)
- Postal code: 00-001 to 04-999
- Area code: +48 22
- City budget: zł 24.368 billion (€5.4 billion)
- Climate: Warm-summer humid continental climate (Dfb)
- Website: warszawa.pl

UNESCO World Heritage Site
- Official name: Historic Centre of Warsaw
- Criteria: Cultural: ii, vi
- Reference: 30
- Inscription: 1980 (4th Session)

Varsovian Trumpet Call

Warsaw, (Note: English pronunciation: /ˈwɔːrsɔː/, WOR-saw; Polish: Warszawa [varˈʂa.va]; Latin: Varsovia ([varˈsɔː.vi.a])) officially the Capital City of Warsaw, (Note: Polish: miasto stołeczne Warszawa [ˈmja.stɔ stɔˈwɛt͡ʂ.nɛ varˈʂa.va], abbreviation: m.st. Warszawa) is the capital and most populous city of Poland. The metropolis stands on the river Vistula in east-central Poland. Its population is officially estimated at 1.87 million residents within a greater metropolitan area of around 3.5 million residents, which makes Warsaw the 7th most populous city in the European Union. The city area measures 517 square kilometres (200 square miles) and comprises 18 districts, while the metropolitan area covers 6,100 square kilometres (2,355 square miles). Warsaw is classified as an alpha global city, a major political, economic and cultural hub, and the country's seat of government. It is also the capital of the Masovian Voivodeship.

Warsaw traces its origins to a small fishing town which became the seat of the Duchy of Masovia in 1413. The city rose to prominence after 1596, when Sigismund III decided to move the Polish capital and his royal court from Kraków. Warsaw surpassed Gdańsk as Poland's most populous city by the 18th century. It served as the capital of the Polish–Lithuanian Commonwealth until 1795, and subsequently as the seat of Napoleon's Duchy of Warsaw. The 19th century and its Industrial Revolution brought a demographic boom, which made it one of the largest and most densely populated cities in Europe. Known then for its elegant architecture and boulevards, Warsaw was bombed and besieged at the start of World War II in 1939. Much of the historic city was destroyed and its diverse population decimated by the Ghetto Uprising in 1943, the general Warsaw Uprising in 1944, and systematic razing.

Warsaw is served by three international airports, the busiest being Warsaw Chopin Airport. Major public transport services operating in the city include the Warsaw Metro, buses, commuter rail service and an extensive tram network. The city is a significant economic centre for the region, with the Warsaw Stock Exchange being the largest in Central and Eastern Europe. It is the base for Frontex, the EU agency for external border security; also ODIHR, one of the principal institutions of the OSCE and an ESA headquarters. Warsaw has one of Europe's largest concentrations of skyscrapers, and the Varso Tower is the tallest building in the European Union.

The city's primary educational and cultural institutions include the University of Warsaw, the Warsaw University of Technology, the SGH Warsaw School of Economics, the Chopin University of Music, the Polish Academy of Sciences, the National Philharmonic Orchestra, the National Museum, and the Warsaw Grand Theatre, which is among the largest in Europe. The reconstructed Old Town, which represents a variety of European architectural styles, was listed as a World Heritage Site by UNESCO in 1980. Other landmarks include the Royal Castle, Sigismund's Column, the Wilanów Palace, the Palace on the Isle, St. John's Archcathedral, Main Market Square, and numerous churches and mansions along the Royal Route. Warsaw is a green capital, with around a quarter of the city's area occupied by parks. In sports, the city is home to Legia and Polonia sports clubs and hosts the annual Warsaw Marathon.

== Toponymy and names ==
Warsaw's name in the Polish language is Warszawa. Other previous spellings of the name may have included: Warszewa, Warszowa, Worszewa or Werszewa. The exact origin and meaning of the name is uncertain and has not been fully determined. Originally, Warszawa was the name of a small fishing settlement on the banks of the Vistula river. One hypothesis states that Warszawa means "belonging to Warsz", Warsz being a shortened form of the masculine Old Polish name Warcisław, which etymologically is linked with Wrocław. However the ending -awa is unusual for a large city; the names of Polish cities derived from personal names usually end in -ów/owo/ew/ewo (e.g. Piotrków, Adamów).

Folk etymology attributes the city name to Wars and Sawa. There are several versions of the legend with their appearance. According to one version, Sawa was a mermaid living in the Vistula with whom fisherman Wars fell in love. The official city name in full is miasto stołeczne Warszawa ("The Capital City of Warsaw").

A native or resident of Warsaw is known as a Varsovian – in Polish warszawiak, (Note: "native Varsovian") warszawianin (Note: any Varsovian) (male); warszawianka (female); warszawiacy, and warszawianie (plural).

== History ==
=== 1300–1800 ===
The first fortified settlements on the site of today's Warsaw were located in Bródno (9th/10th century) and Jazdów (12th/13th century). After Jazdów was raided by nearby clans and dukes, a new fortified settlement was established on the site of a small fishing village called "Warszowa". The Prince of Płock, Bolesław II of Masovia, established the modern-day city in about 1300 and the first historical document attesting to the existence of a castellany dates to 1313. With the completion of St John's Cathedral in 1390, Warsaw became one of the seats of the Dukes of Masovia and was officially made capital of the Masovian Duchy in 1413. The economy then predominantly rested on craftsmanship or trade, and the town housed approximately 4,500 people at the time.

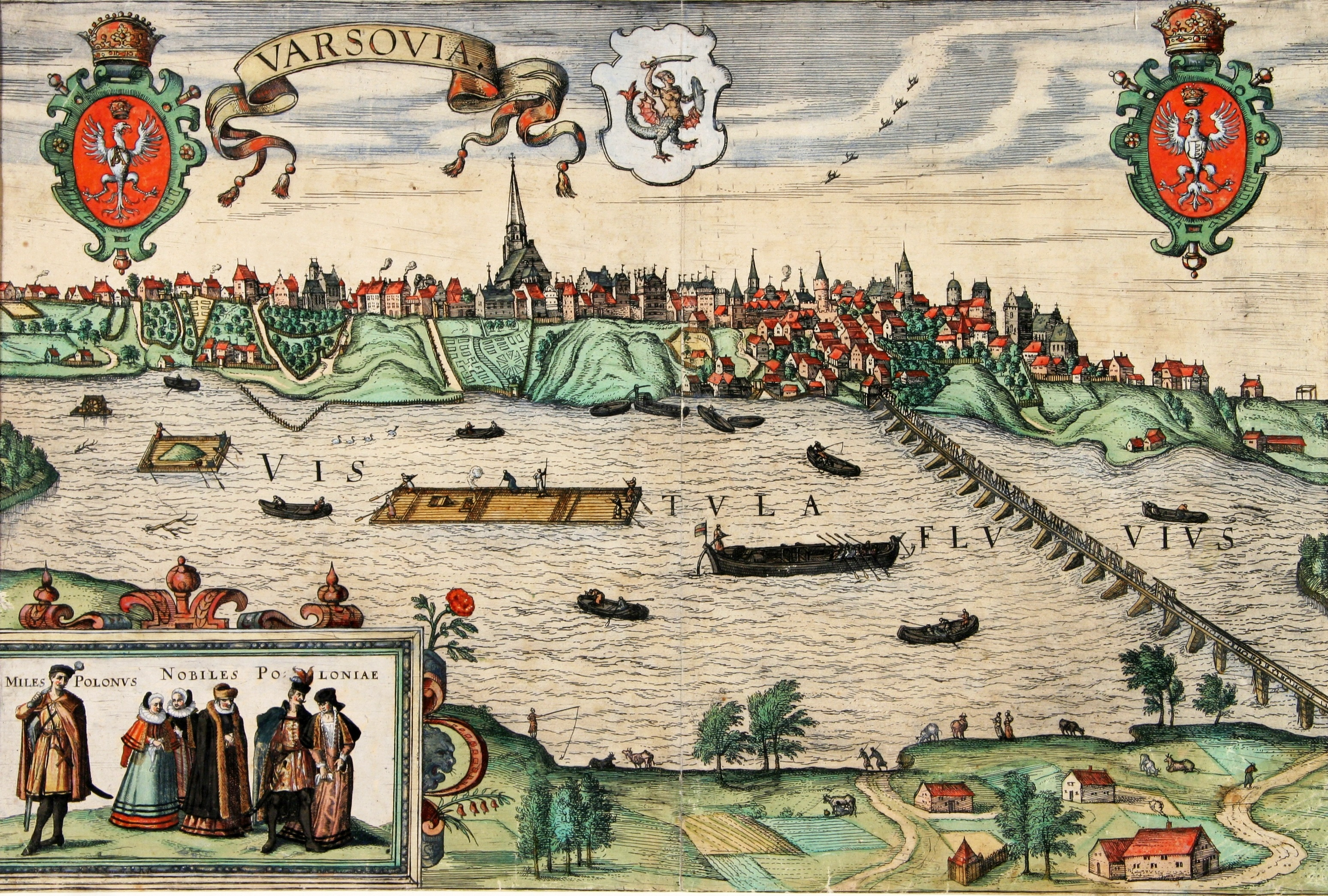
An engraving from Civitates orbis terrarum of 16th-century Warsaw showing the Sigismund Augustus Bridge and St. Mary's Church to the right, and St. John's Archcathedral visible at the centre.

During the 15th century, the population migrated and spread beyond the northern city wall into a newly formed self-governing precinct called New Town. The existing older settlement became eventually known as the Old Town. Both possessed their own town charter and independent councils. The aim of establishing a separate district was to accommodate new incomers or "undesirables" who were not permitted to settle in Old Town, particularly Jews. Social and financial disparities between the classes in the two precincts led to a minor revolt in 1525. Following the sudden death of Janusz III and the extinction of the local ducal line, Masovia was incorporated into the Kingdom of Poland in 1526. Bona Sforza, wife of Sigismund I of Poland, was widely accused of poisoning the duke to uphold Polish rule over Warsaw.

In 1529, Warsaw for the first time became the seat of a General Sejm and held that privilege permanently from 1569. The city's rising importance encouraged the construction of a new set of defenses, including the landmark Barbican. Renowned Italian architects were brought to Warsaw to reshape the Royal Castle, the streets and the marketplace, resulting in the Old Town's early Italianate appearance. In 1573, the city gave its name to the Warsaw Confederation which formally established religious freedom in the Polish–Lithuanian Commonwealth. Due to its central location between the capitals of the Commonwealth's two component parts, Poland and Lithuania, which were Kraków and Vilnius respectively, Warsaw became the capital of the Commonwealth and the Polish Crown when Sigismund III Vasa transferred his royal court in 1596. In the subsequent years the town significantly expanded to the south and westwards. Several private independent districts (jurydyka) were the property of aristocrats and the gentry, which they ruled by their own laws. Between 1655 and 1658 the city was besieged and pillaged by the Swedish, Brandenburgian and Transylvanian forces. The conduct of the Great Northern War (1700–1721) also forced Warsaw to pay heavy tributes to the invading armies.

The reign of Augustus II, Augustus III and Stanisław August Poniatowski was a time of great development for Warsaw, which turned into an early-capitalist city. The Saxon monarchs employed many German architects, sculptors and engineers, who added elements to the city in a style parallel with Dresden, chiefly the Saxon Axis, while Poniatowski boosted the native Polish architectural and artisanal scene. The year 1727 marked the opening of the Saxon Garden in Warsaw, the first publicly accessible park. The Załuski Library, the first Polish public library and the largest at the time, was founded in 1747. Stanisław II Augustus, who remodelled the interior of the Royal Castle, also made Warsaw a centre of culture and the arts. He extended the Royal Baths Park and ordered the construction or refurbishment of numerous palaces, mansions and richly decorated tenements. This earned Warsaw the nickname Paris of the North. Stanisław August Poniatowski created the first state theater in Warsaw, invested in the Royal Baths Park and created the Stanislavian Axis (Polish: Oś Stanisławowska), a large infrastructural undertaking.

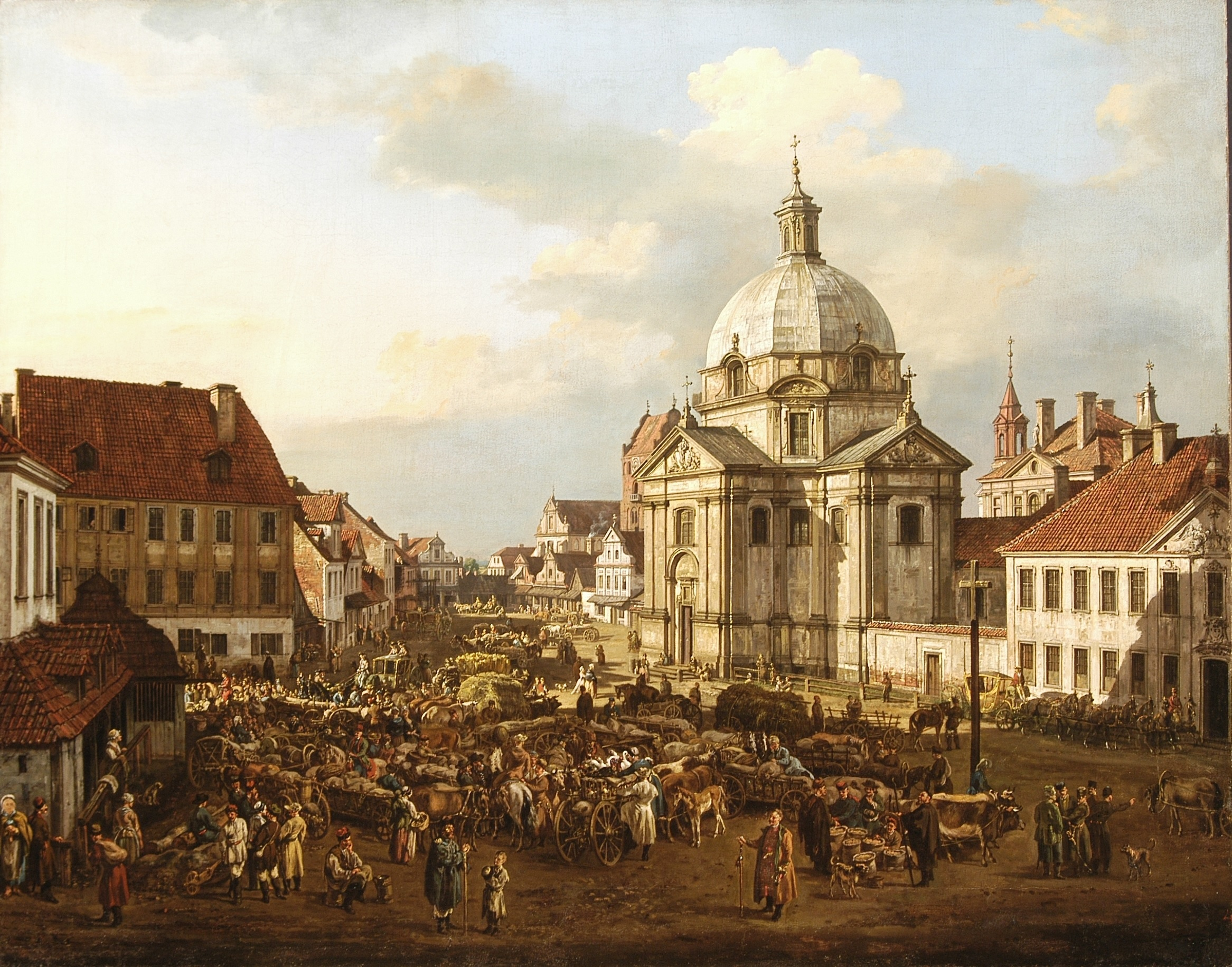
Warsaw New Town in 1778. Painted by Bernardo Bellotto.

Warsaw remained the capital of the Polish–Lithuanian Commonwealth until 1795 when it was annexed by the Kingdom of Prussia in the third and final partition of Poland; it subsequently became the capital of the province of South Prussia. During this time, Louis XVIII of France spent his exile in Warsaw under the pseudonym Comte de Lille.

=== 1800–1939 ===
Warsaw was made the capital of a newly created French client state, known as the Duchy of Warsaw, after a portion of Poland's territory was liberated from Prussia, Russia and Austria by Napoleon in 1806. Following Napoleon's defeat and exile, the 1815 Congress of Vienna assigned Warsaw to Congress Poland, a constitutional monarchy within the easternmost sector (or partition) under a personal union with Imperial Russia. The Royal University of Warsaw was established in 1816.

With the violation of the Polish constitution, the 1830 November Uprising broke out against foreign influence. The Polish-Russian war of 1831 ended in the uprising's defeat and in the curtailment of Congress Poland's autonomy. On 27 February 1861, a Warsaw crowd protesting against Russian control over Congress Poland was fired upon by Russian troops. Five people were killed. The Underground Polish National Government resided in Warsaw during the January Uprising in 1863–64.

Warsaw flourished throughout the 19th century under Mayor Sokrates Starynkiewicz (1875–92), who was appointed by Alexander III. Under Starynkiewicz Warsaw saw its first water and sewer systems designed and built by the English engineer William Lindley and his son, William Heerlein Lindley, as well as the expansion and modernisation of trams, street lighting, and gas infrastructure. Between 1850 and 1882, the population grew by 134% to 383,000 as a result of rapid urbanisation and industrialisation. Many migrated from surrounding rural Masovian towns and villages to the city for employment opportunities. The western borough of Wola was transformed from an agricultural periphery occupied mostly by small farms and windmills (mills being the namesake of Wola's central neighbourhood Młynów) to an industrial and manufacturing centre. Metallurgical, textile and glassware factories were commonplace, with chimneys dominating the westernmost skyline.

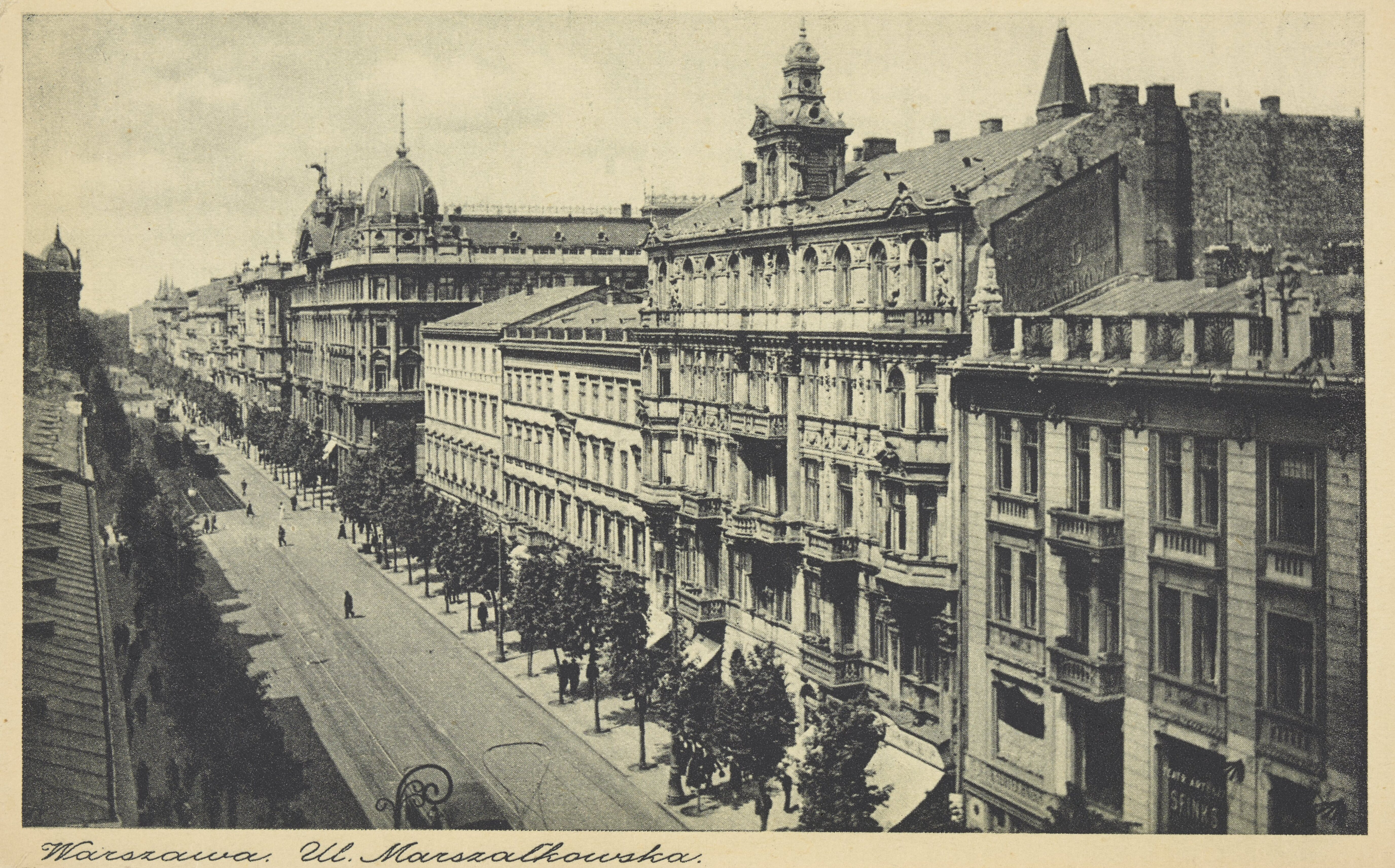
Marszałkowska Street, before 1920

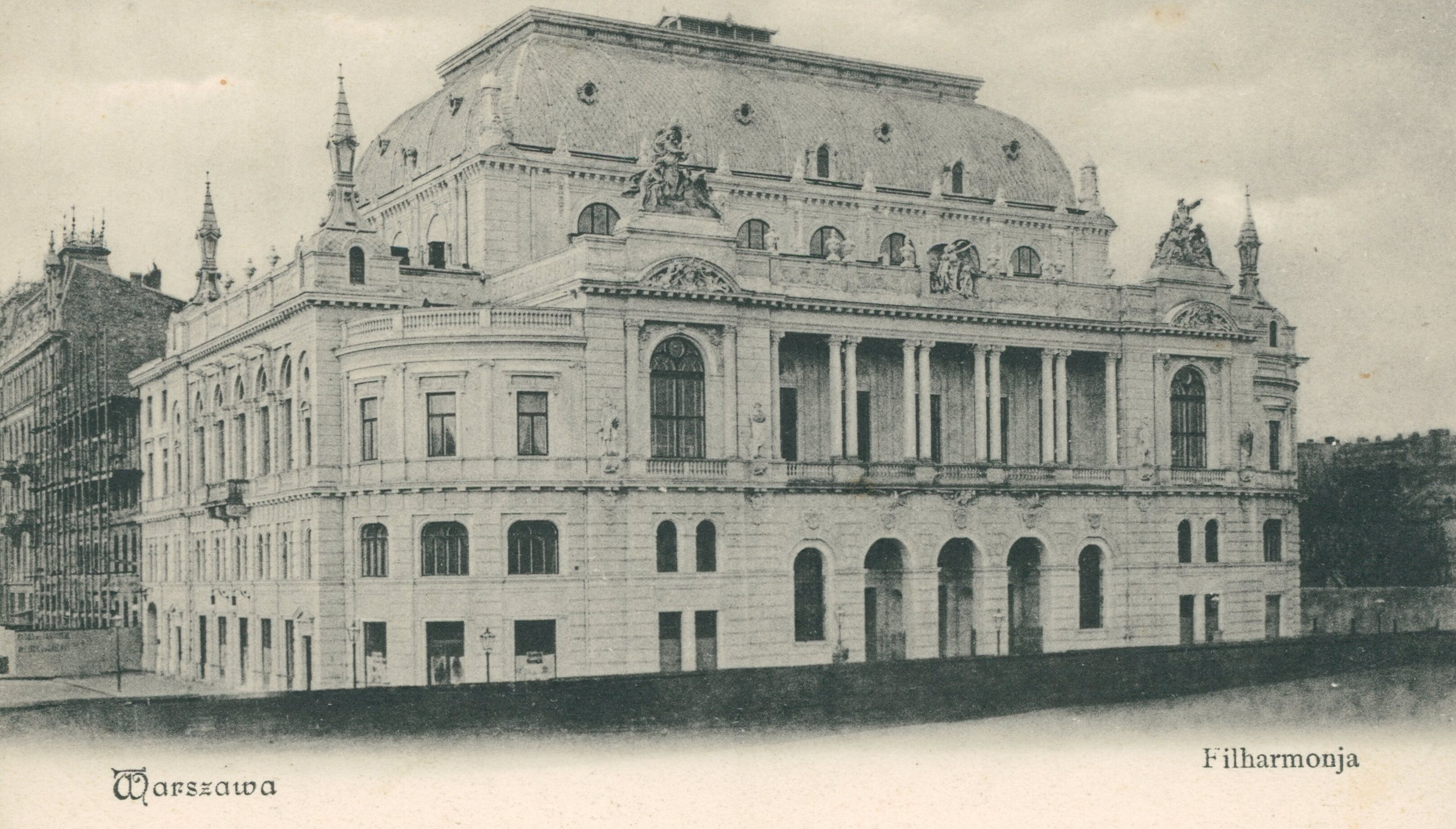
National Philharmonic, before 1906

Like London, Warsaw's population was subjected to income segmentation. Gentrification of inner suburbs forced poorer residents to move across the river into Praga or Powiśle and Solec districts, similar to the East End of London and London Docklands. Poorer religious and ethnic minorities, such as the Jews, settled in the crowded parts of northern Warsaw, in Muranów. The Imperial Census of 1897 recorded 626,000 people living in Warsaw, making it the third-largest city of the Empire after St. Petersburg and Moscow as well as the largest city in the region. Grand architectural complexes and structures were also erected in the city centre, including the Warsaw Philharmonic, the Church of the Holiest Saviour and tenements along Marszałkowska Street.

During World War I, Warsaw was occupied by Germany from 4 August 1915 until November 1918. The Armistice of 11 November 1918 concluded that defeated Germany is to withdraw from all foreign areas, which included Warsaw. Germany did so, and underground leader Józef Piłsudski returned to Warsaw on the same day which marked the beginning of the Second Polish Republic, the first truly sovereign Polish state after 1795. In the course of the Polish–Soviet War (1919–1921), the 1920 Battle of Warsaw was fought on the eastern outskirts of the city. Poland successfully defended the capital, stopped the brunt of the Bolshevik Red Army and temporarily halted the "export of the communist revolution" to other parts of Europe.

The interwar period (1918–1939) was a time of major development in the city's infrastructure. New modernist housing estates were built in Mokotów to de-clutter the densely populated inner suburbs. In 1921, Warsaw's total area was estimated at only 124.7 km^{2} (48.1 sq mi) with 1 million inhabitants–over 8,000 people/km^{2} made Warsaw more densely populated than contemporary London. The Średnicowy Bridge was constructed for railway (1921–1931), connecting both parts of the city across the Vistula. Warszawa Główna railway station (1932–1939) was not completed due to the outbreak of the Second World War.

Stefan Starzyński was the Mayor of Warsaw between 1934 and 1939.

=== World War II ===
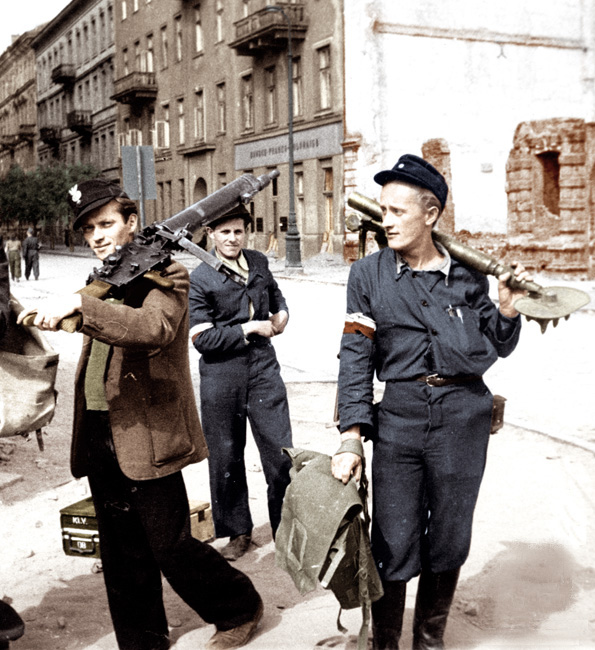
The Warsaw Uprising took place in 1944. The Polish Home Army attempted to liberate Warsaw from the Germans before the arrival of the Red Army.

After the German invasion of Poland on 1 September 1939 started World War II, Warsaw was defended until 27 September. Central Poland, including Warsaw, came under the rule of the General Government, a German Nazi colonial administration. All higher education institutions were immediately closed and Warsaw's entire Jewish population – several hundred thousand, some 30% of the city – were herded into the Warsaw Ghetto. In July 1942, the Jews of the Warsaw Ghetto began to be deported en masse to the Aktion Reinhard extermination camps, particularly Treblinka. The city would become the centre of urban resistance to Nazi rule in occupied Europe. When the order came to annihilate the ghetto as part of Hitler's "Final Solution" on 19 April 1943, Jewish fighters launched the Warsaw Ghetto Uprising. Despite being heavily outgunned and outnumbered, the ghetto held out for almost a month. When the fighting ended, almost all survivors were massacred, with only a few managing to escape or hide.

By July 1944, the Red Army was deep into Polish territory and pursuing the Nazis toward Warsaw. The Polish government-in-exile in London gave orders to the underground Home Army (AK) to try to seize control of Warsaw before the Red Army arrived. Thus, on 1 August 1944, as the Red Army was nearing the city, the Warsaw Uprising began. The armed struggle, planned to last 48 hours, was partially successful, however, it went on for 63 days. Eventually, the Home Army fighters and civilians assisting them were forced to capitulate. They were transported to PoW camps in Germany, while the entire civilian population was expelled. Polish civilian deaths are estimated at between 150,000 and 200,000.

Hitler, ignoring the agreed terms of the capitulation, ordered the entire city to be razed to the ground and the library and museum collections taken to Germany or burned. Monuments and government buildings were blown up by special German troops known as Verbrennungs- und Vernichtungskommando ("Burning and Destruction Detachments"). About 85% of the city was destroyed, including the historic Old Town and the Royal Castle.

On 17 January 1945 – after the beginning of the Vistula–Oder Offensive of the Red Army – Soviet troops and Polish troops of the First Polish Army entered the ruins of Warsaw, and liberated Warsaw's suburbs from German occupation. The city was swiftly freed by the Soviet Army, which rapidly advanced towards Łódź, as German forces regrouped at a more westward position.

=== 1945–1989 ===
In 1945, after the bombings, revolts, fighting, and demolition had ended, most of Warsaw lay in ruins. The area of the former ghetto was razed to the ground, with only a sea of rubble remaining. The immense destruction prompted a temporary transfer of the new government and its officials to Łódź, which became the transitional seat of power. Nevertheless, Warsaw officially resumed its role as the capital of Poland and the country's centre of political and economic life.

After World War II, the "Bricks for Warsaw" campaign was initiated and large prefabricated housing projects were erected in Warsaw to address the major housing shortage. Plattenbau-styled apartment buildings were seen as a solution to avoid Warsaw's former density problem and to create more green spaces. Some of the buildings from the 19th century that had survived in a reasonably reconstructible form were nonetheless demolished in the 1950s and 1960s, like the Kronenberg Palace. The Śródmieście (central) region's urban system was completely reshaped; former cobblestone streets were asphalted and significantly widened for traffic use. Many notable streets such as Gęsia, Nalewki and Wielka disappeared as a result of these changes and some were split in half due to the construction of Plac Defilad (Parade Square), one of the largest of its kind in Europe.

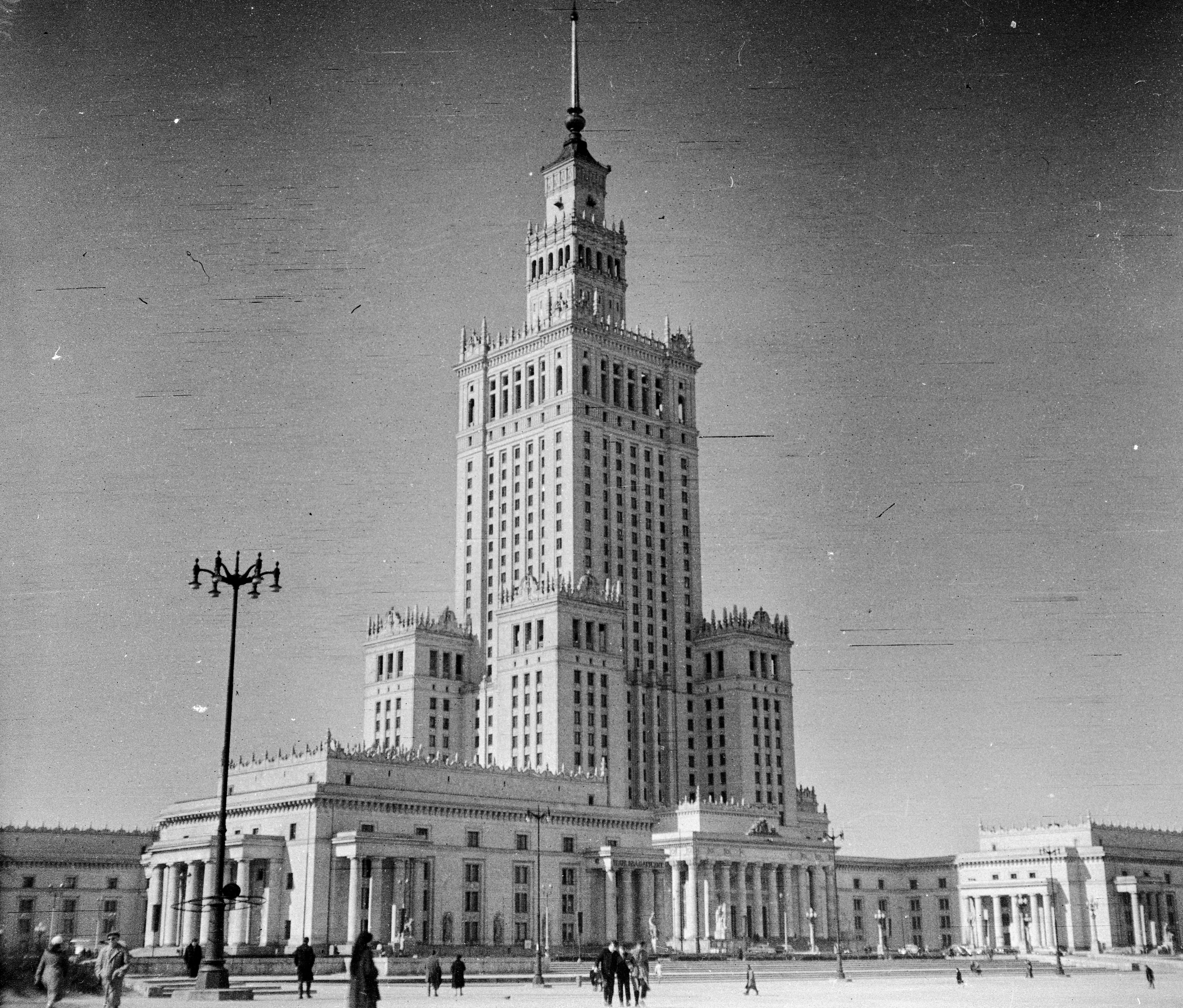
Palace of Culture and Science in 1960.

Much of the central district was also designated for future skyscrapers. The 237-metre Palace of Culture and Science resembling New York's Empire State Building was built as a gift from the Soviet Union. Warsaw's urban landscape is one of modern and contemporary architecture. Despite wartime destruction and post-war remodelling, many of the historic streets, buildings, and churches were restored to their original form.

John Paul II's visits to his native country in 1979 and 1983 brought support to the budding "Solidarity" movement and encouraged the growing anti-communist fervor there. In 1979, less than a year after becoming pope, John Paul celebrated Mass in Victory Square in Warsaw and ended his sermon with a call to "renew the face" of Poland. These words were meaningful for Varsovians and Poles who understood them as the incentive for liberal-democratic reforms.

=== 1989–present ===
In 1995, the Warsaw Metro opened with a single line. A second line was opened in March 2015. On 28 September 2022, three new Warsaw metro stations were opened, increasing the number of Warsaw Metro stations to 36 and its length to 38.3 kilometers. In February 2023, Warsaw's mayor, Rafał Trzaskowski, announced plans to more than double the size of the city's metro system by 2050.

With the entry of Poland into the European Union in 2004, Warsaw is experiencing a large economic boom. The opening fixture of UEFA Euro 2012 took place in Warsaw and the city also hosted the 2013 United Nations Climate Change Conference and the 2016 NATO Summit. As of August 2022, Warsaw had received around 180,000 refugees from Ukraine, because of the 2022 Russian invasion of Ukraine. The amount means a tenth of the Polish capital's population of 1.8 million—the second-largest single group of Ukrainian refugees.

== Geography ==
=== Location and topography ===
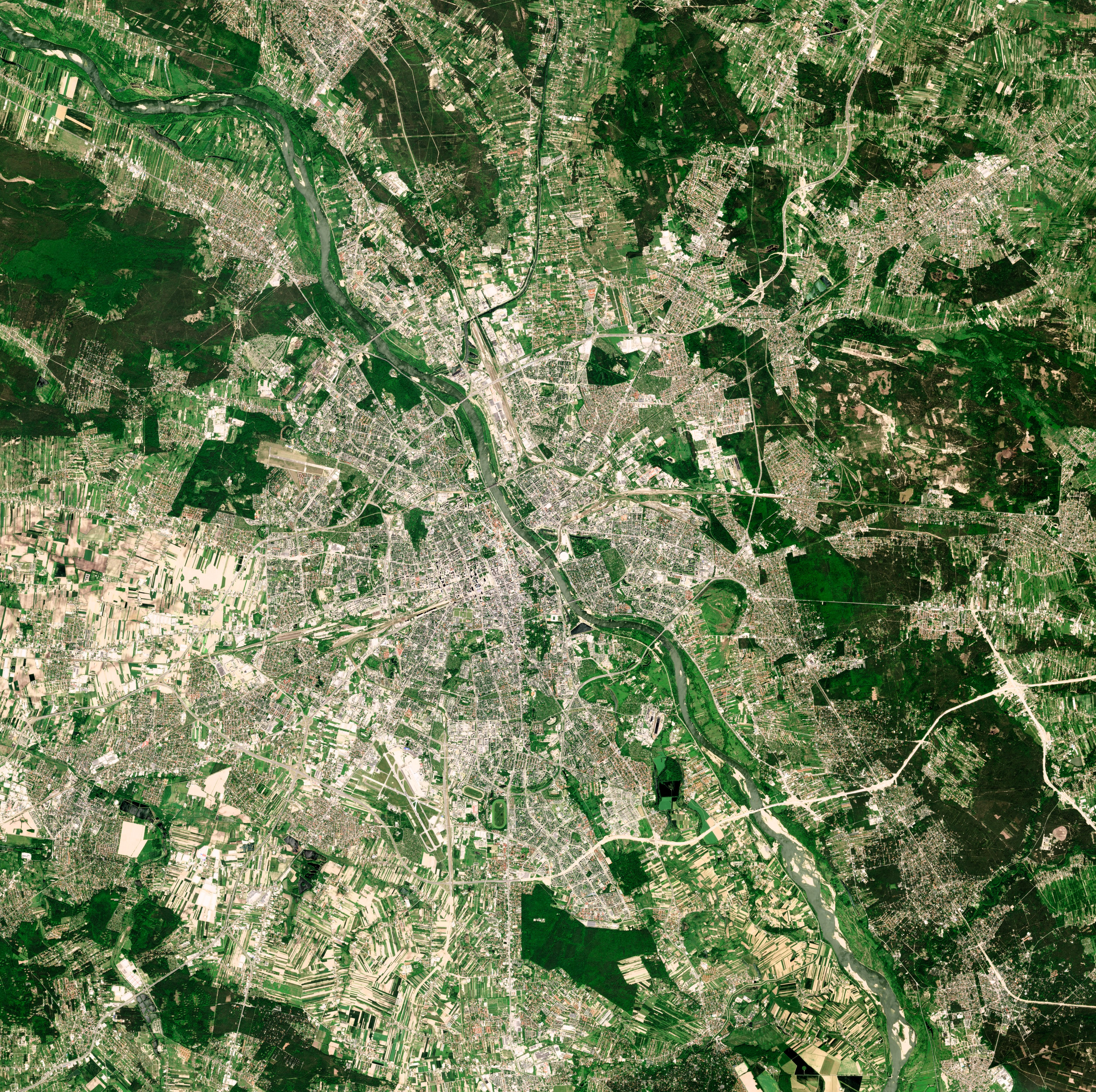
Warsaw, as seen from the European Space Agency (ESA) Sentinel-2

Warsaw lies in east-central Poland about 300 kilometres (190 mi) from the Carpathian Mountains and about 260 kilometres (160 mi) from the Baltic Sea, 523 kilometres (325 mi) east of Berlin, Germany. The city straddles the Vistula River. It is located in the heartland of the Masovian Plain, and its average elevation is 100 metres (330 ft) above sea level. The highest point on the West side of the city lies at a height of 115.7 metres (380 ft) ("Redutowa" bus depot, district of Wola), on the East side – 122.1 metres (401 ft) ("Groszówka" estate, district of Wesoła, by the eastern border). The lowest point lies at a height 75.6 metres (248 ft) (at the right bank of the Vistula, by the eastern border of Warsaw). There are some hills (mostly artificial) located within the confines of the city – e.g. Warsaw Uprising Hill (121 metres (397 ft)) and Szczęśliwice hill (138 metres (453 ft)) – the highest point of Warsaw in general).

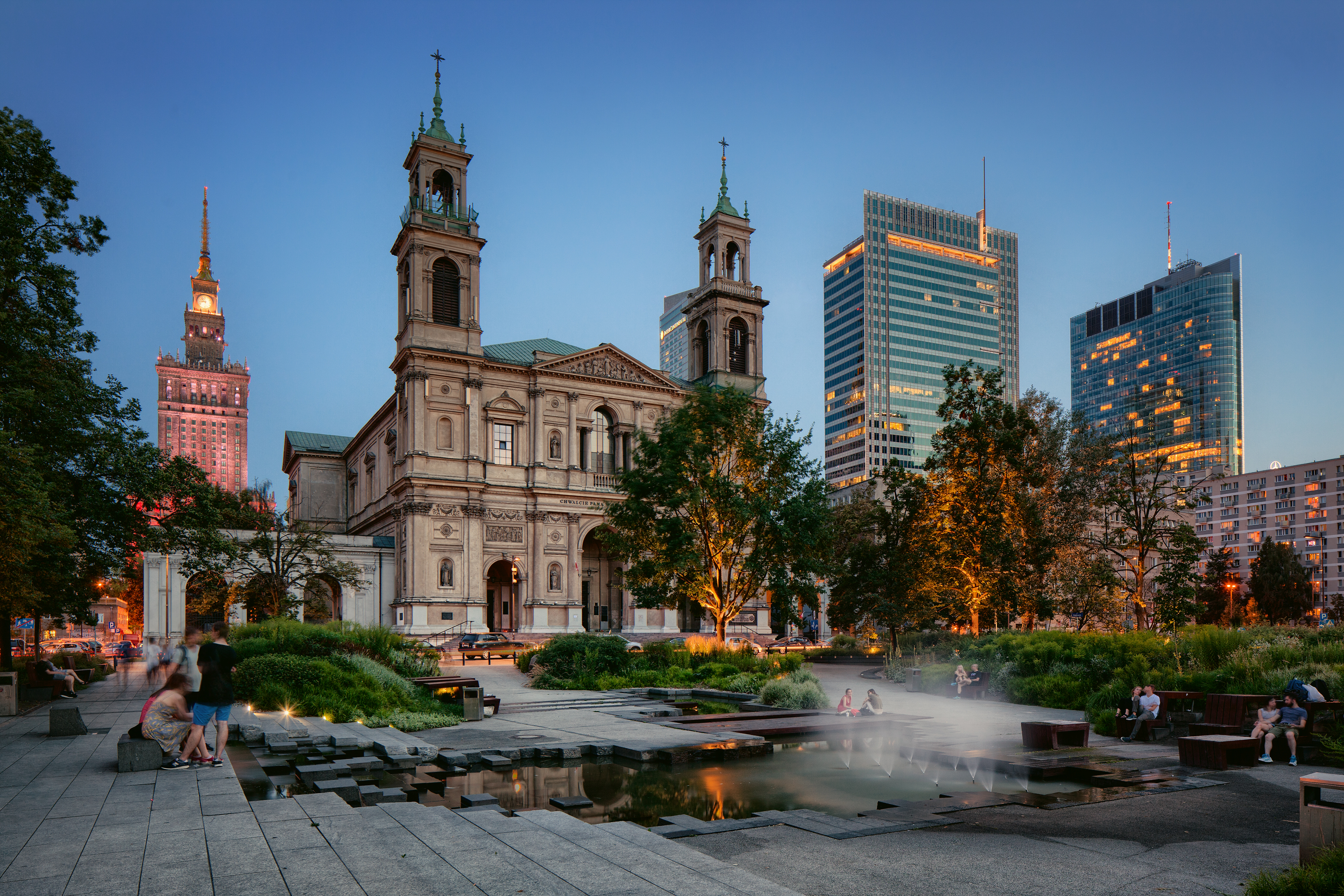
Grzybowski Square – central Warsaw is located on the flat Masovian Plain, but at a higher elevation than the Powiśle riverside.

Warsaw is located on two main geomorphologic formations: the plain moraine plateau and the Vistula Valley with its asymmetrical pattern of different terraces. The Vistula River is the specific axis of Warsaw, which divides the city into two parts, left and right. The left one is situated both on the moraine plateau (10 to 25 metres (33 to 82 ft) above Vistula level) and on the Vistula terraces (max. 6.5 metres (21 ft) above Vistula level). The significant element of the relief, in this part of Warsaw, is the edge of moraine plateau called Warsaw Escarpment. It is 20 to 25 metres (66 to 82 ft) high in the Old Town and Central district and about 10 metres (33 ft) in the north and south of Warsaw. It goes through the city and plays an important role as a landmark.

The plain moraine plateau has only a few natural and artificial ponds and also groups of clay pits. The pattern of the Vistula terraces is asymmetrical. The left side consists mainly of two levels: the highest one contains former flooded terraces and the lowest one is the floodplain terrace. The contemporary flooded terrace still has visible valleys and ground depressions with water systems coming from the old Vistula – riverbed. They consist of still quite natural streams and lakes as well as the pattern of drainage ditches. The right side of Warsaw has a different pattern of geomorphological forms. There are several levels of the Vistula plain terraces (flooded as well as formerly flooded), and only a small part is a not-so-visible moraine escarpment. Aeolian sand with a number of dunes parted by peat swamps or small ponds cover the highest terrace. These are mainly forested areas (pine forest).

=== Climate ===
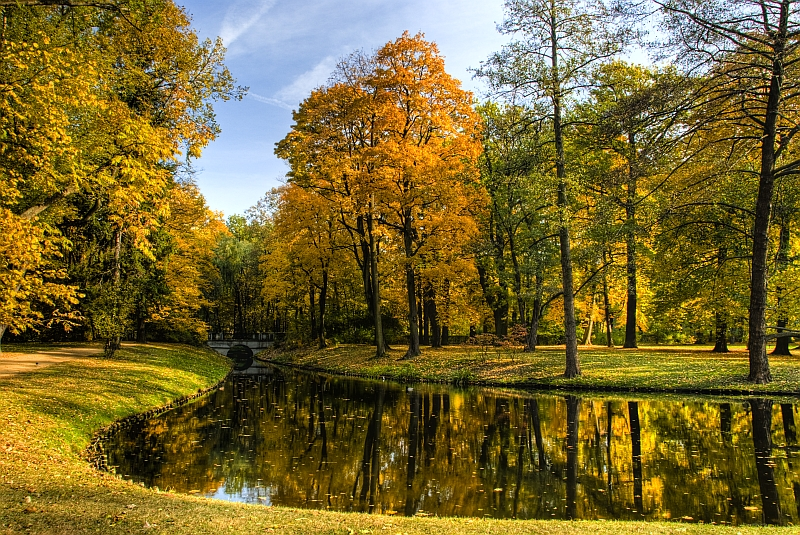
Autumn in Warsaw's Royal Baths

Warsaw experiences an oceanic (Köppen: Cfb) or humid continental (Köppen: Dfb) climate, depending on the isotherm used; although the city used to be humid continental regardless of isotherm prior to the recent effect of climate change and the city's urban heat island. Meanwhile, by the genetic climate classification of Wincenty Okołowicz, it has a temperate "fusion" climate, with both oceanic and continental features.

The city has cold, sometimes snowy, cloudy winters, and warm, relatively sunny but frequently stormy summers. Spring and autumn can be unpredictable, highly prone to sudden weather changes; however, temperatures are usually mild, especially around May and September. The daily average temperature ranges between −1.5 °C (29 °F) in January and 19.7 °C (67.5 °F) in July and the mean year temperature is 9.0 °C (48.2 °F). Temperatures may reach 30 °C (86 °F) in the summer, although the effects of hot weather are usually offset by relatively low dew points and large diurnal temperature differences. Warsaw is Europe's sixth driest major city (driest in Central Europe), with yearly rainfall averaging 550 mm (22 in), the wettest month being July. The coldest temperature ever recorded was −31 °C (−24 °F) on 11 January 1940 during a devastating cold wave which occurred while the city was under German occupation.

Climate data for Warsaw (WAW), 1991–2020 normals, extremes 1779–present
| Month | Jan | Feb | Mar | Apr | May | Jun | Jul | Aug | Sep | Oct | Nov | Dec | Year |
|---|---|---|---|---|---|---|---|---|---|---|---|---|---|
| Record high °C (°F) | 18.9 (66.0) | 18.3 (64.9) | 25.3 (77.5) | 30.4 (86.7) | 32.8 (91.0) | 38.1 (100.6) | 36.5 (97.7) | 37.0 (98.6) | 34.5 (94.1) | 25.9 (78.6) | 19.2 (66.6) | 15.4 (59.7) | 38.1 (100.6) |
| Mean maximum °C (°F) | 8.6 (47.5) | 10.1 (50.2) | 16.6 (61.9) | 23.9 (75.0) | 27.6 (81.7) | 30.7 (87.3) | 32.2 (90.0) | 32.0 (89.6) | 26.7 (80.1) | 21.7 (71.1) | 14.8 (58.6) | 9.4 (48.9) | 33.7 (92.7) |
| Mean daily maximum °C (°F) | 1.0 (33.8) | 2.6 (36.7) | 7.4 (45.3) | 14.6 (58.3) | 19.8 (67.6) | 23.1 (73.6) | 25.2 (77.4) | 24.7 (76.5) | 19.1 (66.4) | 12.9 (55.2) | 6.5 (43.7) | 2.3 (36.1) | 13.3 (55.9) |
| Daily mean °C (°F) | −1.5 (29.3) | −0.4 (31.3) | 3.2 (37.8) | 9.2 (48.6) | 14.3 (57.7) | 17.7 (63.9) | 19.7 (67.5) | 19.1 (66.4) | 14.0 (57.2) | 8.7 (47.7) | 3.8 (38.8) | −0.1 (31.8) | 9.0 (48.2) |
| Mean daily minimum °C (°F) | −4.0 (24.8) | −3.3 (26.1) | −0.6 (30.9) | 4.0 (39.2) | 8.8 (47.8) | 12.4 (54.3) | 14.5 (58.1) | 13.8 (56.8) | 9.5 (49.1) | 5.0 (41.0) | 1.3 (34.3) | −2.5 (27.5) | 4.9 (40.8) |
| Mean minimum °C (°F) | −15.5 (4.1) | −12.9 (8.8) | −8.2 (17.2) | −2.9 (26.8) | 1.4 (34.5) | 6.7 (44.1) | 9.0 (48.2) | 7.8 (46.0) | 2.7 (36.9) | −2.9 (26.8) | −6.4 (20.5) | −11.7 (10.9) | −17.8 (0.0) |
| Record low °C (°F) | −30.7 (−23.3) | −27.6 (−17.7) | −22.6 (−8.7) | −6.9 (19.6) | −3.1 (26.4) | 1.8 (35.2) | 4.6 (40.3) | 3.0 (37.4) | −1.6 (29.1) | −9.6 (14.7) | −17.0 (1.4) | −24.8 (−12.6) | −30.7 (−23.3) |
| Average precipitation mm (inches) | 31.0 (1.22) | 29.8 (1.17) | 29.0 (1.14) | 35.1 (1.38) | 55.5 (2.19) | 63.9 (2.52) | 82.2 (3.24) | 60.6 (2.39) | 50.4 (1.98) | 40.2 (1.58) | 36.0 (1.42) | 36.1 (1.42) | 549.7 (21.64) |
| Average extreme snow depth cm (inches) | 6.4 (2.5) | 6.6 (2.6) | 4.0 (1.6) | 1.0 (0.4) | 0.0 (0.0) | 0.0 (0.0) | 0.0 (0.0) | 0.0 (0.0) | 0.0 (0.0) | 0.2 (0.1) | 2.4 (0.9) | 3.7 (1.5) | 6.6 (2.6) |
| Average precipitation days (≥ 1.0 mm) | 8.3 | 7.7 | 7.8 | 6.8 | 9.1 | 9.1 | 9.4 | 8.2 | 8.0 | 7.6 | 8.1 | 8.4 | 98.6 |
| Average snowy days (≥ 0 cm) | 18.3 | 15.5 | 10.2 | 6.7 | 1.4 | 0.0 | 0.0 | 0.0 | 2.2 | 4.5 | 6.8 | 13.7 | 68.0 |
| Average relative humidity (%) | 86.8 | 83.6 | 75.8 | 67.6 | 68.3 | 69.3 | 70.9 | 71.6 | 78.9 | 83.6 | 88.5 | 86.6 | 77.8 |
| Average dew point °C (°F) | −3 (27) | −3 (27) | −1 (30) | 3 (37) | 8 (46) | 11 (52) | 14 (57) | 13 (55) | 10 (50) | 6 (43) | 2 (36) | −2 (28) | 5 (41) |
| Mean monthly sunshine hours | 44.6 | 66.5 | 139.4 | 210.1 | 272.4 | 288.8 | 295.4 | 280.2 | 193.1 | 122.6 | 50.6 | 33.6 | 1,997.1 |
| Average ultraviolet index | 1 | 1 | 2 | 4 | 5 | 6 | 6 | 5 | 4 | 2 | 1 | 0 | 3 |
Source 1: Institute of Meteorology and Water Management
Source 2: Meteomodel.pl (records, relative humidity 1991–2020) Weather Atlas (UV), Time and Date (dewpoints, 1985–2015)

Climate data for Warsaw-Bielany, 1991–2020 normals, extremes 1951–present
| Month | Jan | Feb | Mar | Apr | May | Jun | Jul | Aug | Sep | Oct | Nov | Dec | Year |
|---|---|---|---|---|---|---|---|---|---|---|---|---|---|
| Record high °C (°F) | 18.9 (66.0) | 18.3 (64.9) | 23.1 (73.6) | 30.5 (86.9) | 32.9 (91.2) | 36.2 (97.2) | 36.9 (98.4) | 38.0 (100.4) | 34.3 (93.7) | 26.4 (79.5) | 19.2 (66.6) | 15.4 (59.7) | 38.0 (100.4) |
| Mean maximum °C (°F) | 8.7 (47.7) | 10.4 (50.7) | 17.2 (63.0) | 24.5 (76.1) | 28.3 (82.9) | 31.2 (88.2) | 32.6 (90.7) | 32.3 (90.1) | 27.1 (80.8) | 22.1 (71.8) | 15.0 (59.0) | 9.8 (49.6) | 34.2 (93.6) |
| Mean daily maximum °C (°F) | 1.4 (34.5) | 3.1 (37.6) | 7.9 (46.2) | 15.1 (59.2) | 20.4 (68.7) | 23.5 (74.3) | 25.6 (78.1) | 25.1 (77.2) | 19.5 (67.1) | 13.3 (55.9) | 6.9 (44.4) | 2.7 (36.9) | 13.7 (56.7) |
| Daily mean °C (°F) | −1.1 (30.0) | −0.1 (31.8) | 3.6 (38.5) | 9.7 (49.5) | 14.8 (58.6) | 18.2 (64.8) | 20.2 (68.4) | 19.4 (66.9) | 14.2 (57.6) | 8.9 (48.0) | 4.2 (39.6) | 0.3 (32.5) | 9.4 (48.9) |
| Mean daily minimum °C (°F) | −3.3 (26.1) | −2.6 (27.3) | 0.2 (32.4) | 4.9 (40.8) | 9.3 (48.7) | 12.9 (55.2) | 14.9 (58.8) | 14.5 (58.1) | 10.2 (50.4) | 5.7 (42.3) | 2.0 (35.6) | −1.8 (28.8) | 5.6 (42.0) |
| Mean minimum °C (°F) | −14.3 (6.3) | −11.3 (11.7) | −6.9 (19.6) | −1.6 (29.1) | 2.6 (36.7) | 7.3 (45.1) | 10.2 (50.4) | 9.0 (48.2) | 3.8 (38.8) | −1.9 (28.6) | −5.1 (22.8) | −10.4 (13.3) | −16.8 (1.8) |
| Record low °C (°F) | −27.9 (−18.2) | −28.0 (−18.4) | −18.1 (−0.6) | −5.5 (22.1) | −2.6 (27.3) | 2.8 (37.0) | 6.5 (43.7) | 5.1 (41.2) | −1.3 (29.7) | −8.3 (17.1) | −15.9 (3.4) | −24.8 (−12.6) | −28.0 (−18.4) |
| Average precipitation mm (inches) | 35.6 (1.40) | 34.4 (1.35) | 34.2 (1.35) | 36.8 (1.45) | 58.1 (2.29) | 67.8 (2.67) | 81.5 (3.21) | 63.3 (2.49) | 50.9 (2.00) | 42.6 (1.68) | 40.8 (1.61) | 41.7 (1.64) | 587.9 (23.15) |
| Average precipitation days (≥ 0.1 mm) | 16.2 | 14.2 | 13.3 | 11.3 | 13.5 | 13.6 | 13.7 | 12.5 | 11.7 | 13.1 | 14.1 | 15.7 | 162.9 |
| Average relative humidity (%) | 85.0 | 82.5 | 75.8 | 66.5 | 66.5 | 66.9 | 69.9 | 70.9 | 79.5 | 83.1 | 86.4 | 86.4 | 76.7 |
Source: meteomodel.pl

Climate data for Warsaw
| Month | Jan | Feb | Mar | Apr | May | Jun | Jul | Aug | Sep | Oct | Nov | Dec | Year |
|---|---|---|---|---|---|---|---|---|---|---|---|---|---|
| Mean daily daylight hours | 8.0 | 10.0 | 12.0 | 14.0 | 16.0 | 17.0 | 16.0 | 15.0 | 13.0 | 11.0 | 9.0 | 8.0 | 12.4 |
Source: Weather Atlas (sunshine data)

== Cityscape ==
=== Urbanism and architecture ===
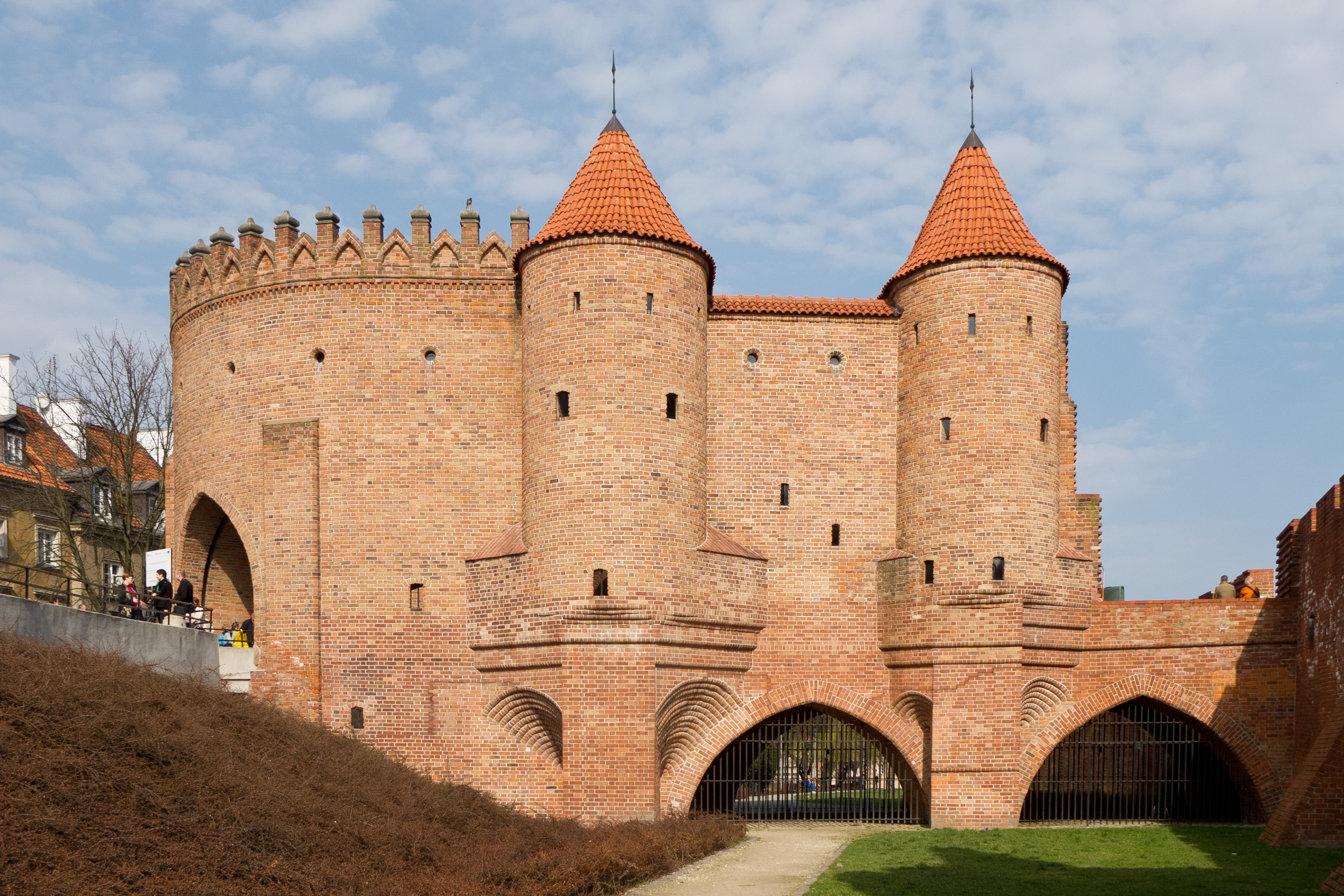
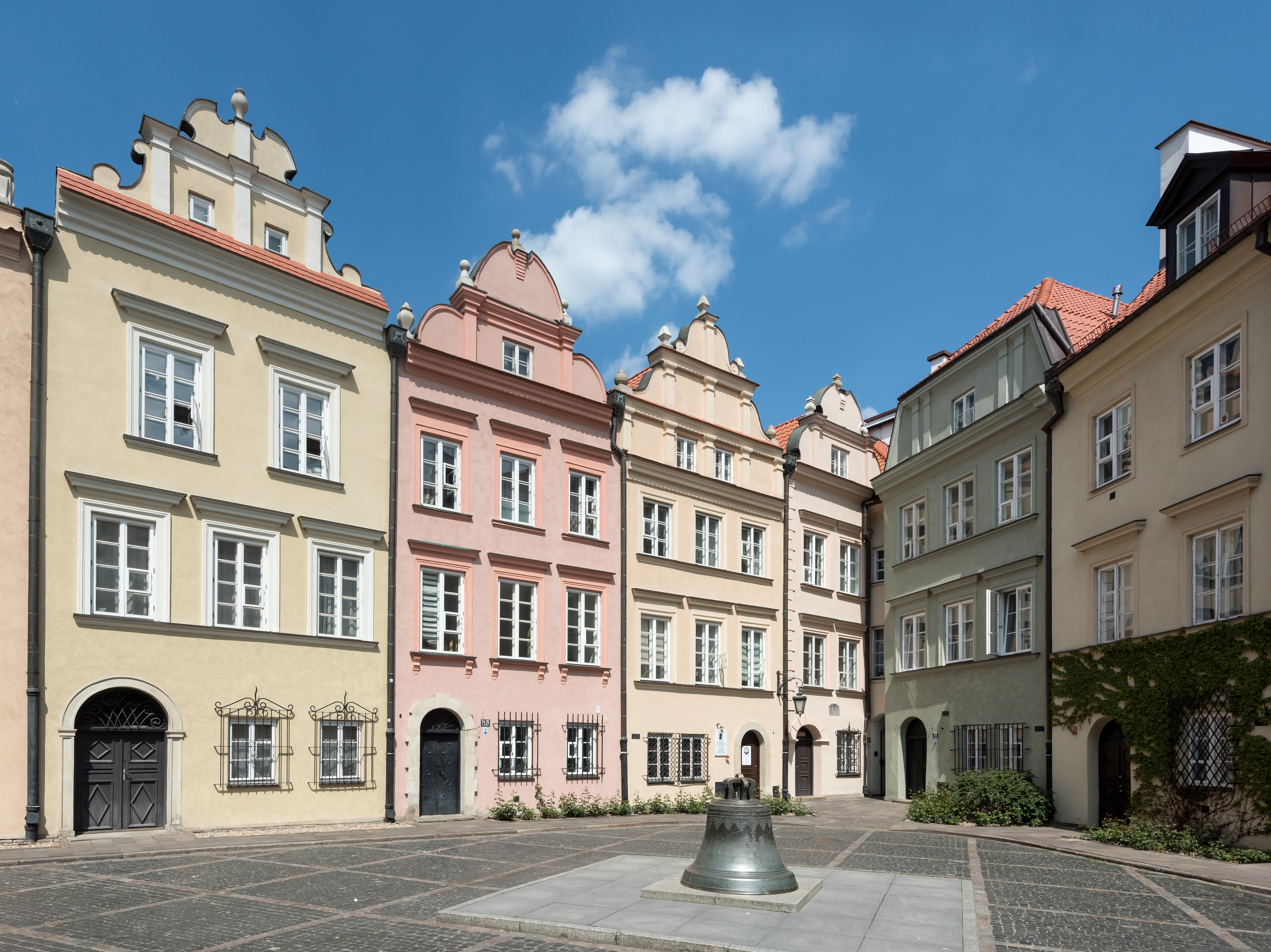
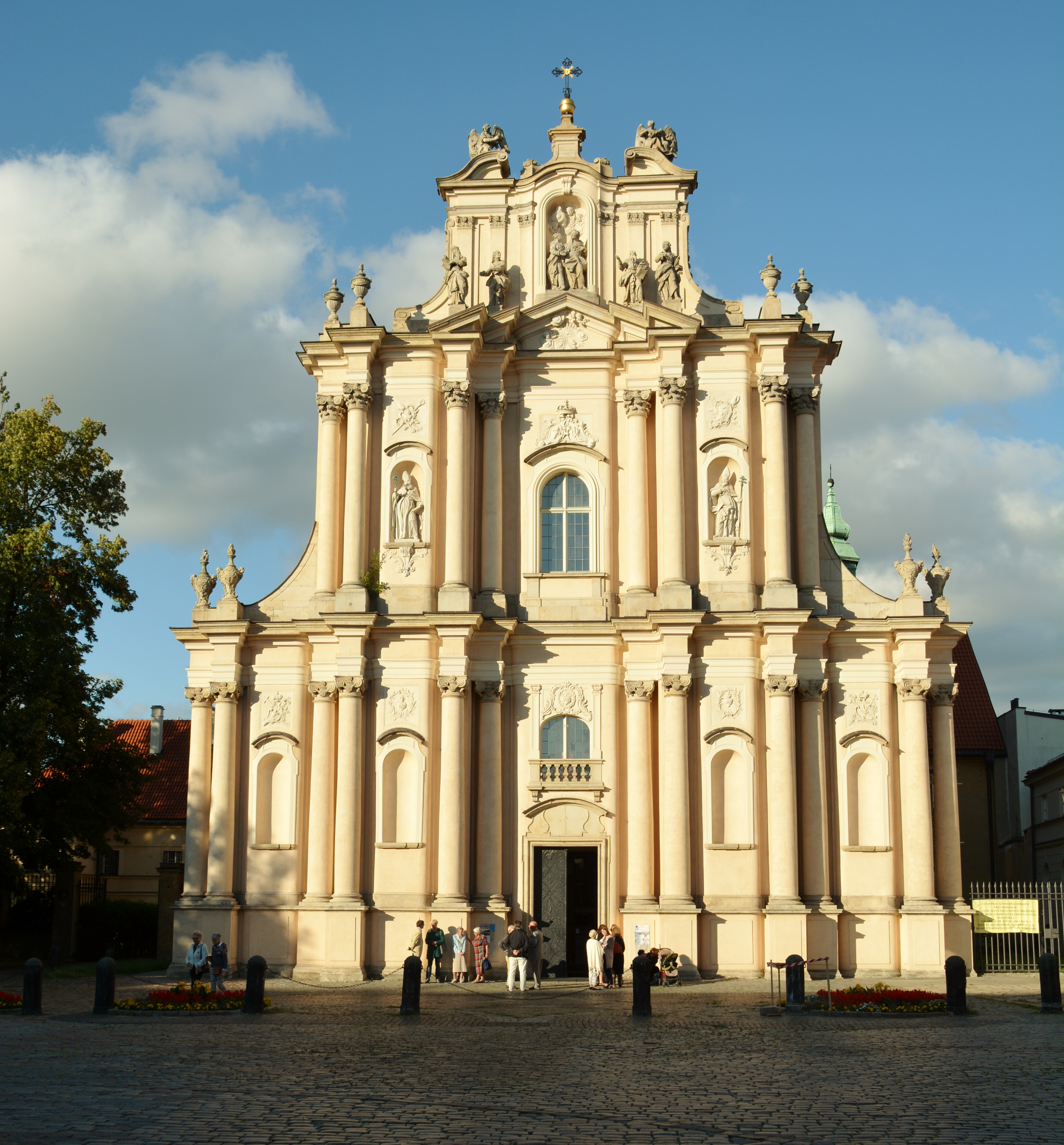
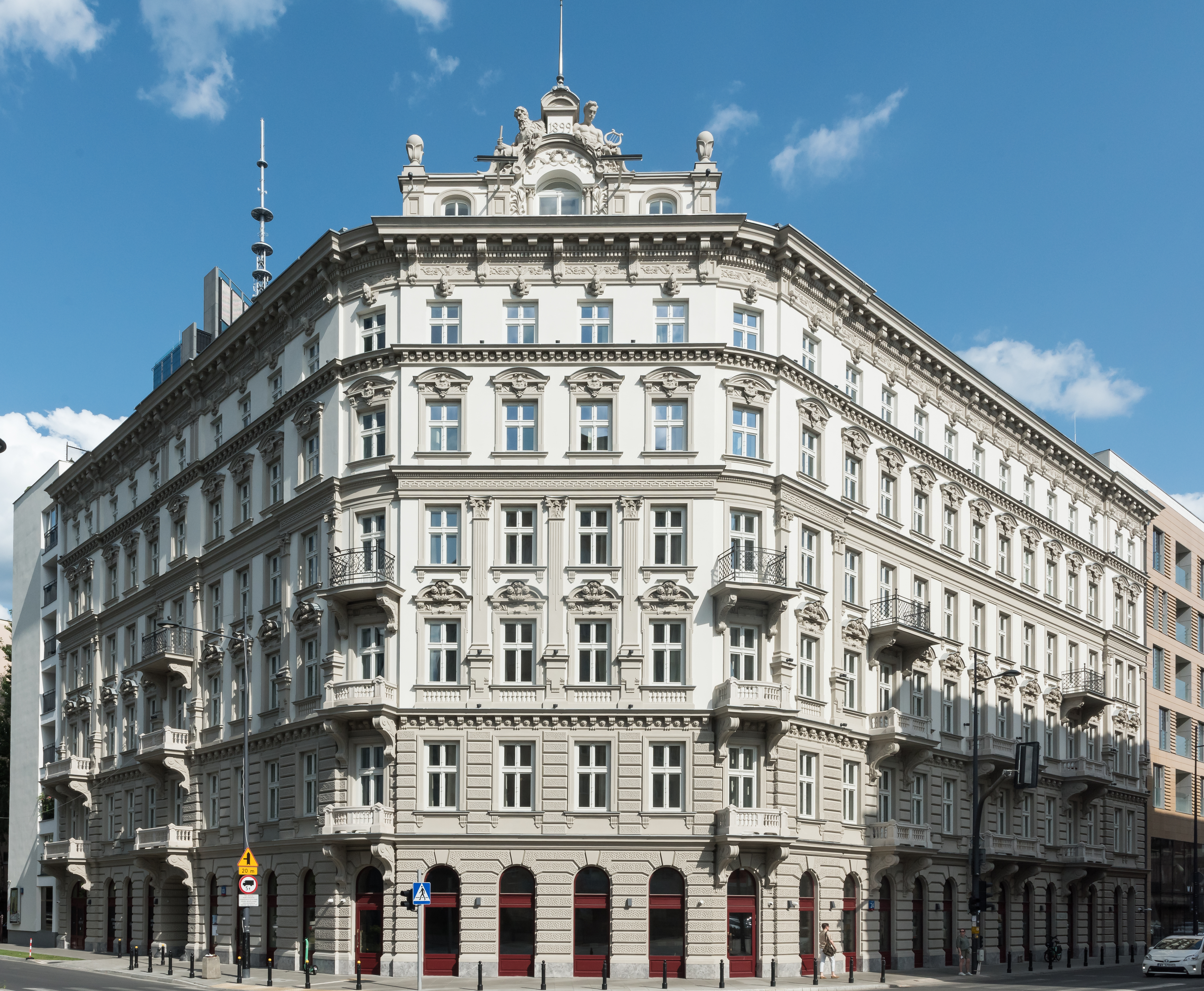
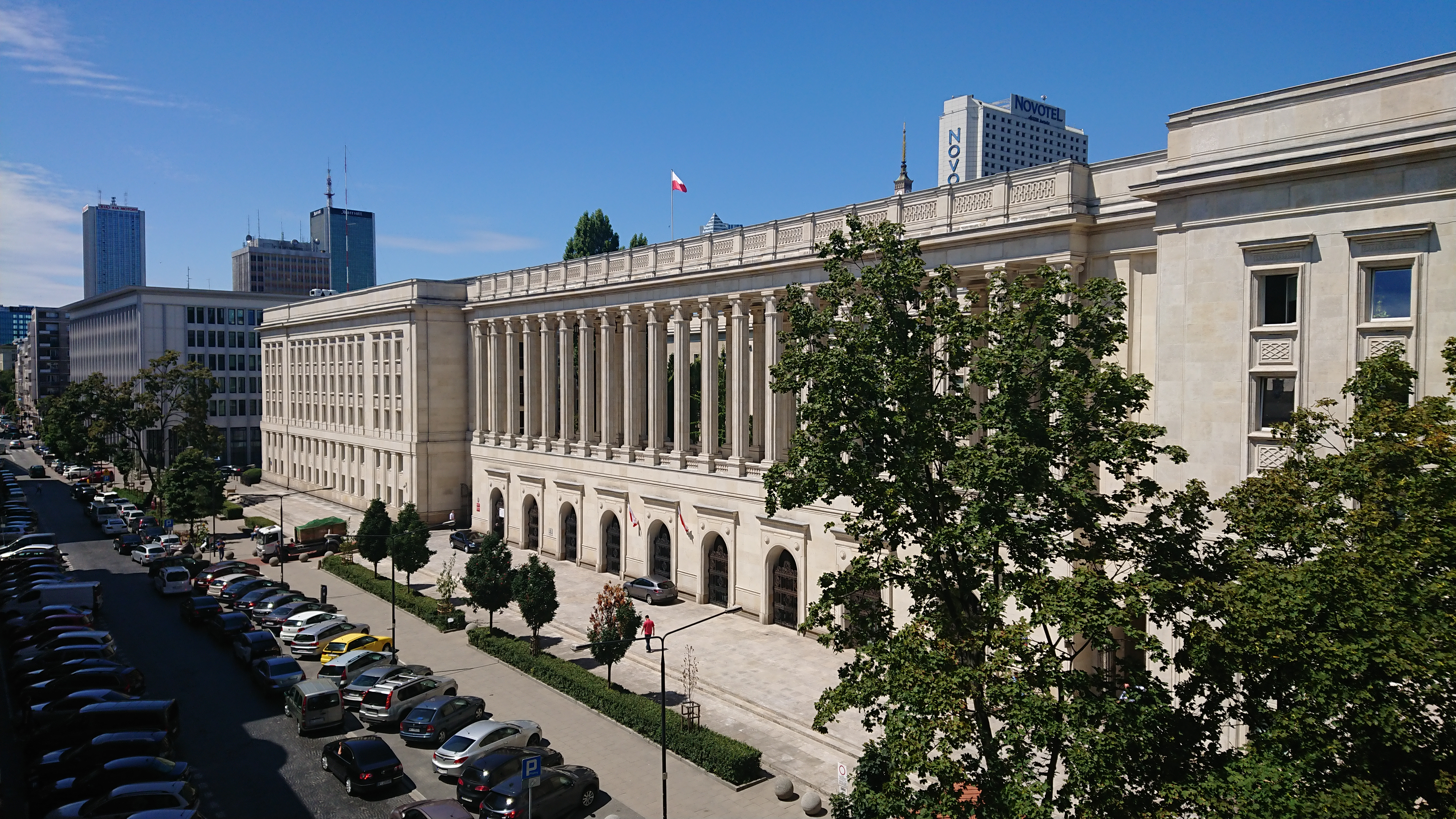
Warsaw is an eclectic city, combining divergent architectural styles and designs. Clockwise: Barbican outpost (16th century), Kanonia Street (17th century), Visitationist Church (18th century), Krongold Tenement (19th century), and the Ministry of Agriculture with skyscrapers (20th century, 21st century).

Warsaw's long and eclectic history left a noticeable mark on its architecture and urban form. Unlike most Polish cities, Warsaw's cityscape is dominated by contemporary architecture, with functionalist and modern edifices. Nonetheless, built heritage is still present in the Old Town and the southern part of the central district. Warsaw is among the European cities with the highest number of skyscrapers in Europe and is home to European Union's tallest building. Skyscrapers are mostly centred around the Śródmieście district, with many located in the commercial district of Wola. A concentric zone pattern emerged within the last decades; the majority of Warsaw's residents live outside the commercial city centre and commute by metro, bus or tram. Residential property in the central neighbourhoods is often reserved for commercial activity or temporary (tourist, student) accommodation. The nearest residential zones are predominantly located on the outskirts of the inner borough, in Ochota, Mokotów and Żoliborz or along the Vistula in Powiśle.

A seat of Polish monarchs since the end of the 16th century, Warsaw remained a small city with only privately owned palaces, mansions, villas and several streets of townhouses designed by the finest German, Italian and Dutch architects, among them Tylman van Gameren, Andreas Schlüter, Jakub Fontana, and Enrico Marconi. The buildings situated in the vicinity of the Warsaw Old Town represent nearly every European architectural style and historical period. Warsaw has excellent examples of architecture from the Gothic, Renaissance, Baroque and Neoclassical periods, all of which are located within walking distance of the centre. This architectural richness has led to Warsaw being described by some commentators as either Paris of the East or Paris of the North.

Gothic architecture is represented in the majestic churches, burgher houses and fortifications. The most significant buildings are St John's Cathedral (1390), a typical Masovian Brick Gothic example; St Mary's Church (1411); the Burbach townhouse (14th century); Gunpowder Tower (after 1379); and Royal Castle's Curia Maior (1407–1410). The most notable examples of Renaissance architecture in the city are the house of the Baryczko merchant family (1562), a building called "The Negro" (early 17th century), and Salwator tenement (1632), all situated on the Old Market Place. Noteworthy examples of Mannerism are the Royal Castle (1596–1619) and the Jesuit Church (1609–1626). Elements of Baroque architecture appeared at the turn of the 17th century with artists from the royal court circle, and with the construction of St. Hyacinth's Church and Sigismund's Column. The Counter-Reformation enforced the Baroque style, as exemplified by the Church of St. Anthony of Padua, the Carmelite Church and the Holy Cross Church. The most significant secular building of this style is the Wilanów Palace, erected for John III Sobieski. The late Baroque era was the epoch of the Saxon Kings (1697–1763). The Saxon Axis and the Visitationist Church date from this period.

The Neoclassical architecture began to be favoured in the second half of the 18th century thanks to King Stanisław August Poniatowski. The best-known architect who worked in Warsaw at the time was Domenico Merlini. Significant buildings from this period include the Rabbit House, Holy Trinity Church, and the façade of St. Anne's Church. Neoclassicism dominated the cityscape of Warsaw throughout the 19th century and its revival affected all aspects of architecture; the most notable examples being the Great Theater, Bank Square, Warsaw Society of Friends of Sciences (Staszic Palace), St. Alexander's Church, the Belweder, and the tenements at Nowy Świat Street. The Saxon Palace underwent a complete reconstruction, where the central body of the building was demolished and replaced by a monumental 11-bay colonnade. The turn of the 20th century also precipitated the Art Nouveau and Neo-Renaissance movements in secular buildings.

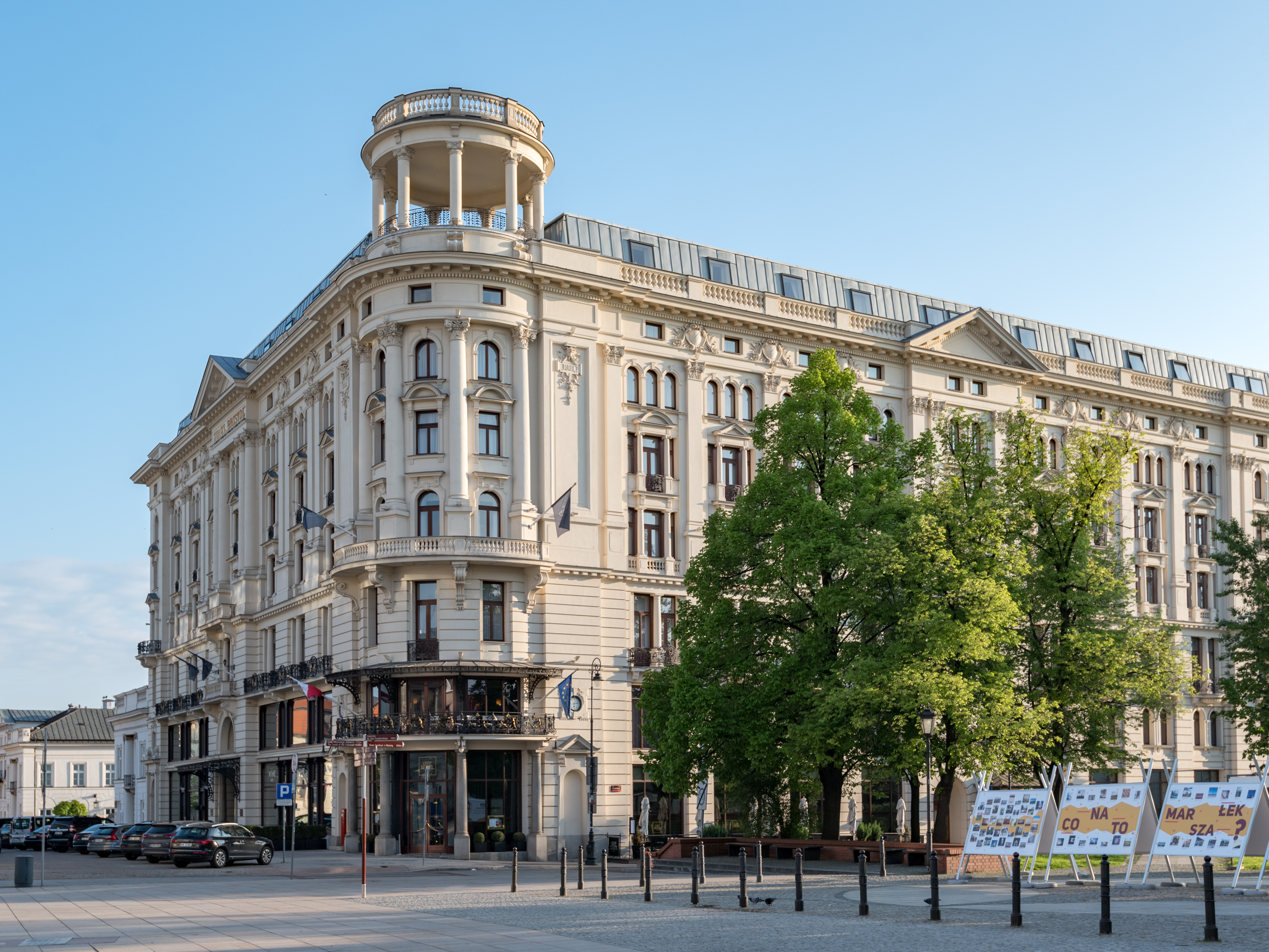
Hotel Bristol is a unique example of Warsaw's architectural heritage, combining Art Nouveau and Neo-Renaissance designs.

After Poland regained its independence in 1918, national historicism became dominant and Art Deco forms also began appearing. The formation of state structures necessitated office space leading to the construction of monumental public buildings, including the buildings of the Sejm and the Senate, the Ministry of Religious Affairs and Public Education, the Ministry of Public Works, the National Museum, the State Geological Institute, the Domestic Economy Bank, the Supreme Audit Office, and the campus of the Warsaw School of Economics. New districts were also established in Żoliborz, Ochota, and Mokotów, often designed around a central square with radiating streets (Narutowicz Square, Wilson Square). Examples of new large urban projects are the Lubecki colonies in Ochota.

Exceptional examples of bourgeois architecture of the later periods were not restored by the communist authorities after the war or were remodelled. Notable examples of post-war architecture include the Palace of Culture and Science, a Stalinist skyscraper based on the Empire State Building in New York. The Constitution Square, with its monumental socialist realist forms, was modelled on the grand squares of Paris, London, Moscow and Rome. Italianate tuscan-styled colonnades based on those at Piazza della Repubblica in Rome were also erected on Saviour Square. Contemporary architecture in Warsaw is represented by the Metropolitan Office Building at Pilsudski Square and Varso tower, both by Norman Foster, Warsaw University Library (BUW) by Marek Budzyński and Zbigniew Badowski, featuring a garden on its roof and view of the Vistula River, Rondo 1 office building by Skidmore, Owings & Merrill, Złota 44 residential skyscraper by Daniel Libeskind, Museum of the History of Polish Jews by Rainer Mahlamäki and the Golden Terraces, a mixed-use retail and business centre featuring a steel diagrid roof.

=== Landmarks ===
Historic Centre of Warsaw
UNESCO World Heritage Site
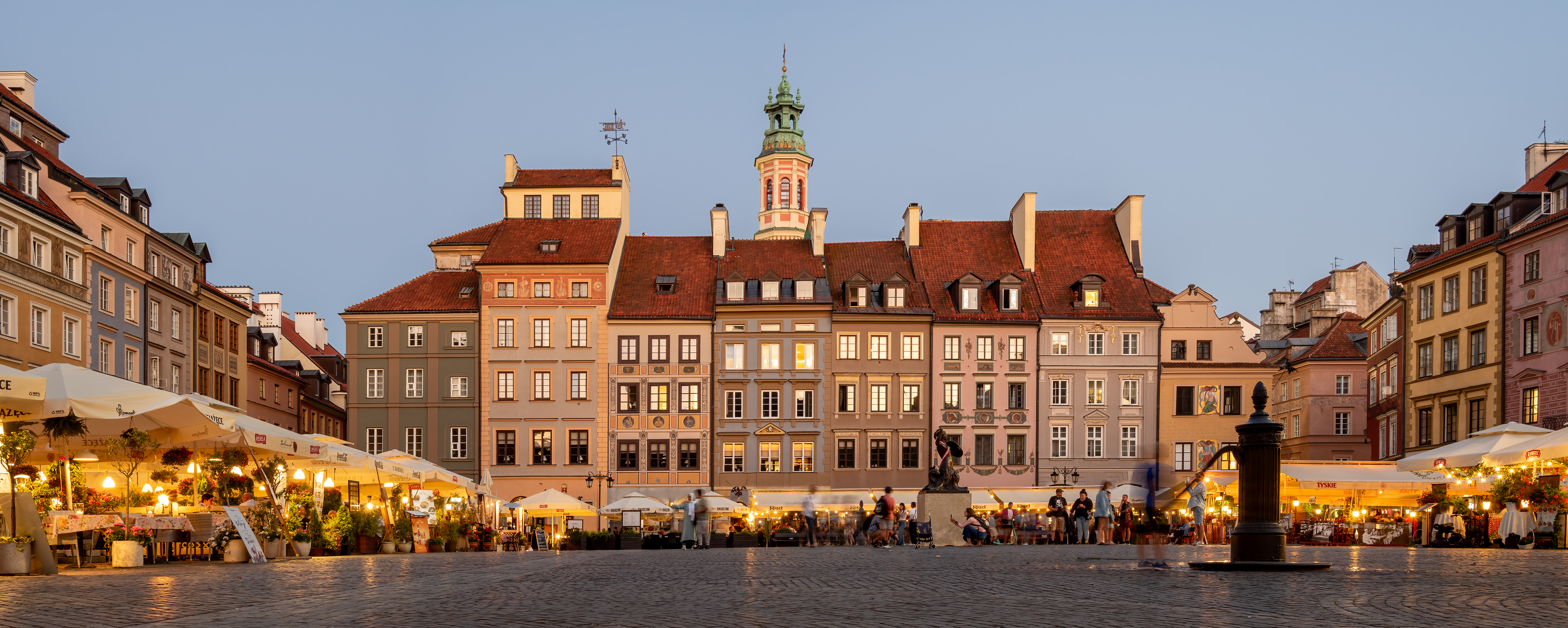
- Main Market Square in Old Town, a UNESCO World Heritage Site
- Interactive map of Historic Centre of Warsaw
- Criteria: Cultural: II, VI
- Reference: 30
- Inscription: 1980 (4th Session)

Map of Warsaw Old Town

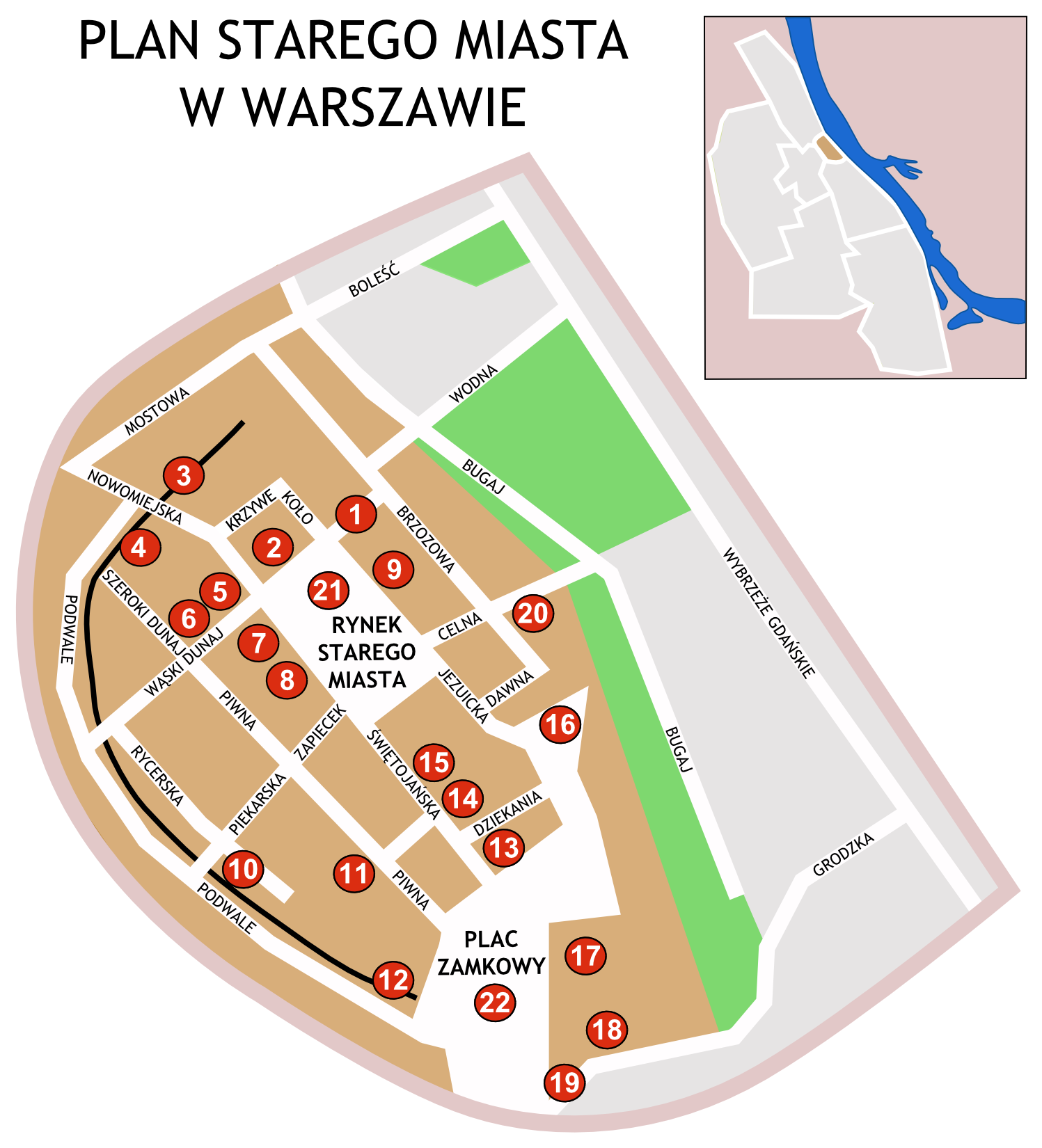
1. Stone stairs; 2. Museum of Warsaw; 3. Barbican; 4. Defensive walls; 5. Salwator tenement; 6. Museum of Leather Crafts; 7. St. Anne's tenement; 8. Fukier tenement; 9. Museum of Literature; 10. Museum of Artistic and Precision Crafts; 11. St. Mary's Church; 12. Gothic Bridge; 13. Pelican house; 14. St. John's Cathedral; 15. Jesuit Church; 16. Canonicity; 17. Royal Castle; 18. Copper-Roof Palace; 19. East – West Route tunnel; 20. Dung Hill; 21. Warsaw Mermaid statue; 22. Sigismund's Column

Although contemporary Warsaw is a fairly young city compared to other European capitals, it has numerous tourist attractions and architectural monuments dating back centuries. Apart from the Warsaw Old Town area, reconstructed after World War II, each borough has something to offer. Among the most notable landmarks of the Old Town are the Royal Castle, Sigismund's Column, Market Square, and the Barbican.

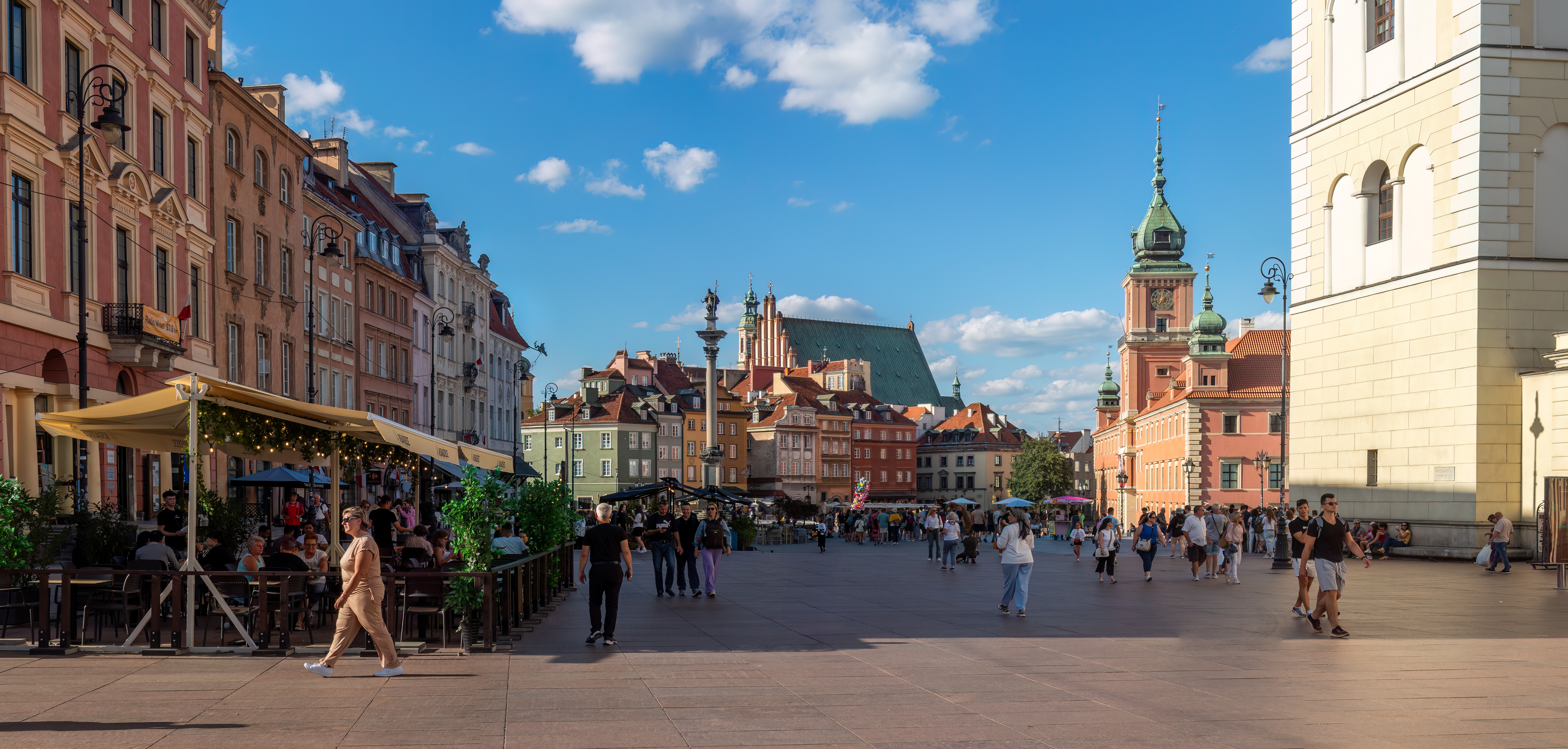
Castle Square, with the Royal Castle and Sigismund's Column in the background

Further south is the so-called Royal Route, with many historical churches, Baroque and Classicist palaces, most notably the Presidential Palace, and the University of Warsaw campus. The former royal residence of King John III Sobieski at Wilanów is notable for its Baroque architecture and eloquent palatial garden.

In many places in the city the Jewish culture and history resonates down through time. Among them the most notable are the Jewish theater, the Nożyk Synagogue, Janusz Korczak's Orphanage and the picturesque Próżna Street. The tragic pages of Warsaw's history are commemorated in places such as the Monument to the Ghetto Heroes, the Umschlagplatz, fragments of the ghetto wall on Sienna Street and a mound in memory of the Jewish Combat Organization.

Many places commemorate the heroic history of Warsaw such as Pawiak, a German Gestapo prison now occupied by a Mausoleum of Memory of Martyrdom and a museum. The Warsaw Citadel, a 19th-century fortification built after the defeat of the November Uprising, was a place of martyrdom for the Poles. Another important monument, the statue of Little Insurrectionist located at the ramparts of the Old Town, commemorates the children who served as messengers and frontline troops in the Warsaw Uprising, while the Warsaw Uprising Monument by Wincenty Kućma was erected in memory of the largest insurrection of World War II.

In Warsaw there are many places connected with the life and work of Frédéric Chopin who was born near the city in Żelazowa Wola. The heart of the Polish composer is sealed inside Warsaw's Holy Cross Church. During summer, the Chopin Statue in Łazienki Park is a place where pianists give concerts to the park audience.

Also many references to Marie Curie, her work and her family can be found in Warsaw; Curie's birthplace at the Warsaw New Town, the working places where she did her first scientific works and the Radium Institute at Wawelska Street for the research and the treatment of which she founded in 1925.

=== Cemeteries ===
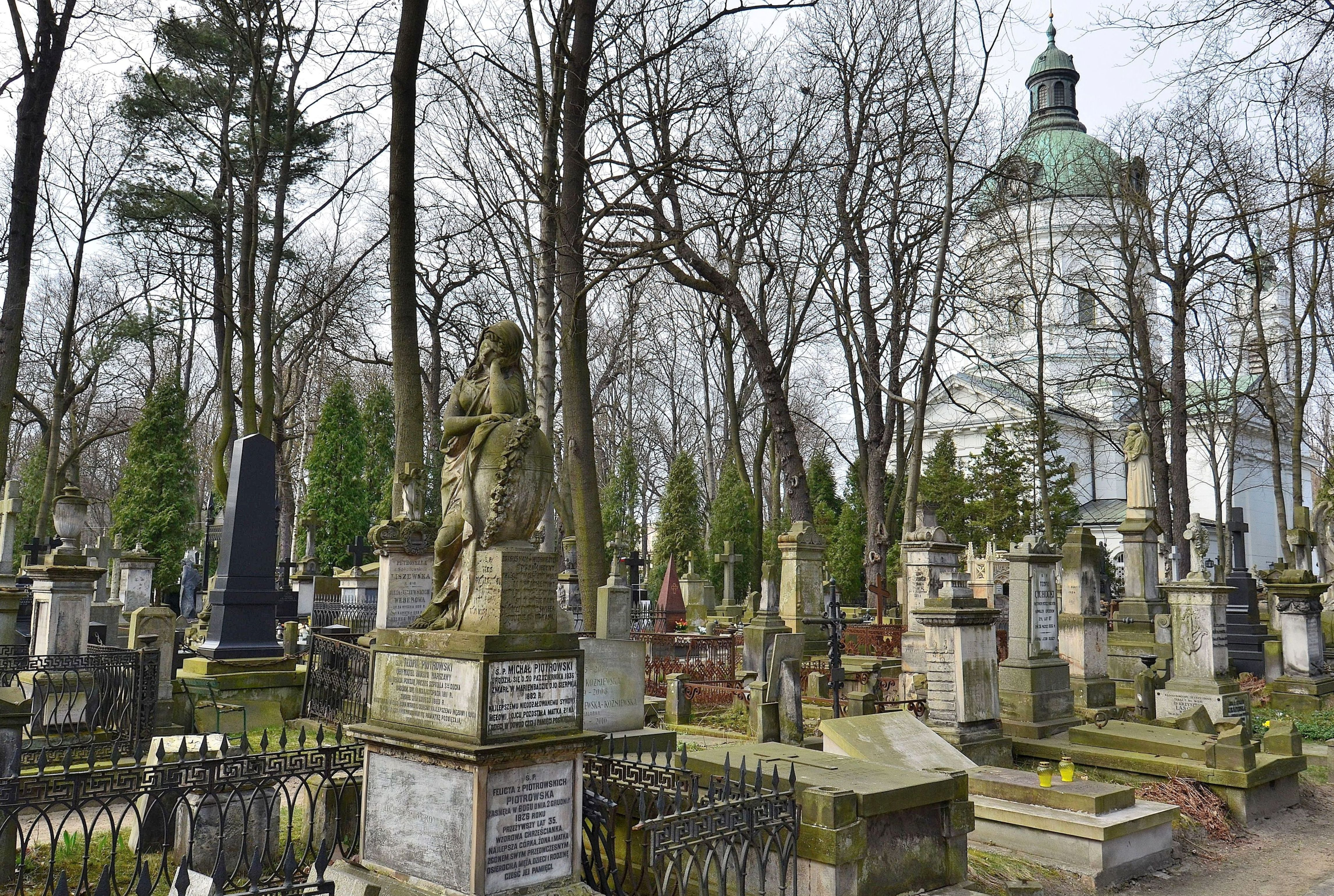
Powązki Cemetery (1790), Warsaw's oldest and most important necropolis

The oldest necropolis in Warsaw is Stare Powązki, established in 1790. It is one of Poland's national necropolises.

The cemetery covers an area of 43 ha. On the day of consecration of the Powązki Cemetery, the foundation stone was laid for the construction of the church of Saint Charles Borromeo, designed by the royal architect Domenico Merlini. Catacombs were intended to be a prestigious resting place intended mainly for the nobles, such as Michał Poniatowski, Hugo Kołłątaj, Michał Kazimierz Ogiński. Over a million people are buried at Stare Powązki. In the Avenue of Merit there are the graves of insurgents and soldiers, independence activists, writers, poets, scientists, artists and thinkers. The nearby Powązki Military Cemetery was established in 1912 for soldiers stationed in Warsaw. After World War II, the cemetery became a burial place for people associated with the Polish People's Republic - politicians, officials and military personnel.

The complex of non-Roman Catholic cemeteries consists of Evangelical–Augsburg Cemetery, Evangelical Reformed Cemetery, Jewish Cemetery, Orthodox Cemetery and Muslim Tatar Cemetery. Other significant Warsaw necropolises are: Bródno Cemetery, Warsaw Insurgents Cemetery, Służew Old Cemetery, Służew New Cemetery. There are two large municipal cemeteries in the city – Northern Communal Cemetery and Southern Communal Cemetery.

=== Memorials ===
The city's symbol is the mermaid placed in the capital's coat of arms. There are three mermaid monuments in Warsaw: one on the banks of the Vistula, the second on the Old Town Square, and the third in Praga-Południe. The oldest monument in Warsaw is the Sigismund's Column. It was built in 1644 according to the design of the Italians: Augustine Locci and Constantin Tencall. The King of Poland Sigismund III Vasa stands on a 22-meter high tower, holding a cross and a sword in his hand. The monument was destroyed and rebuilt many times.

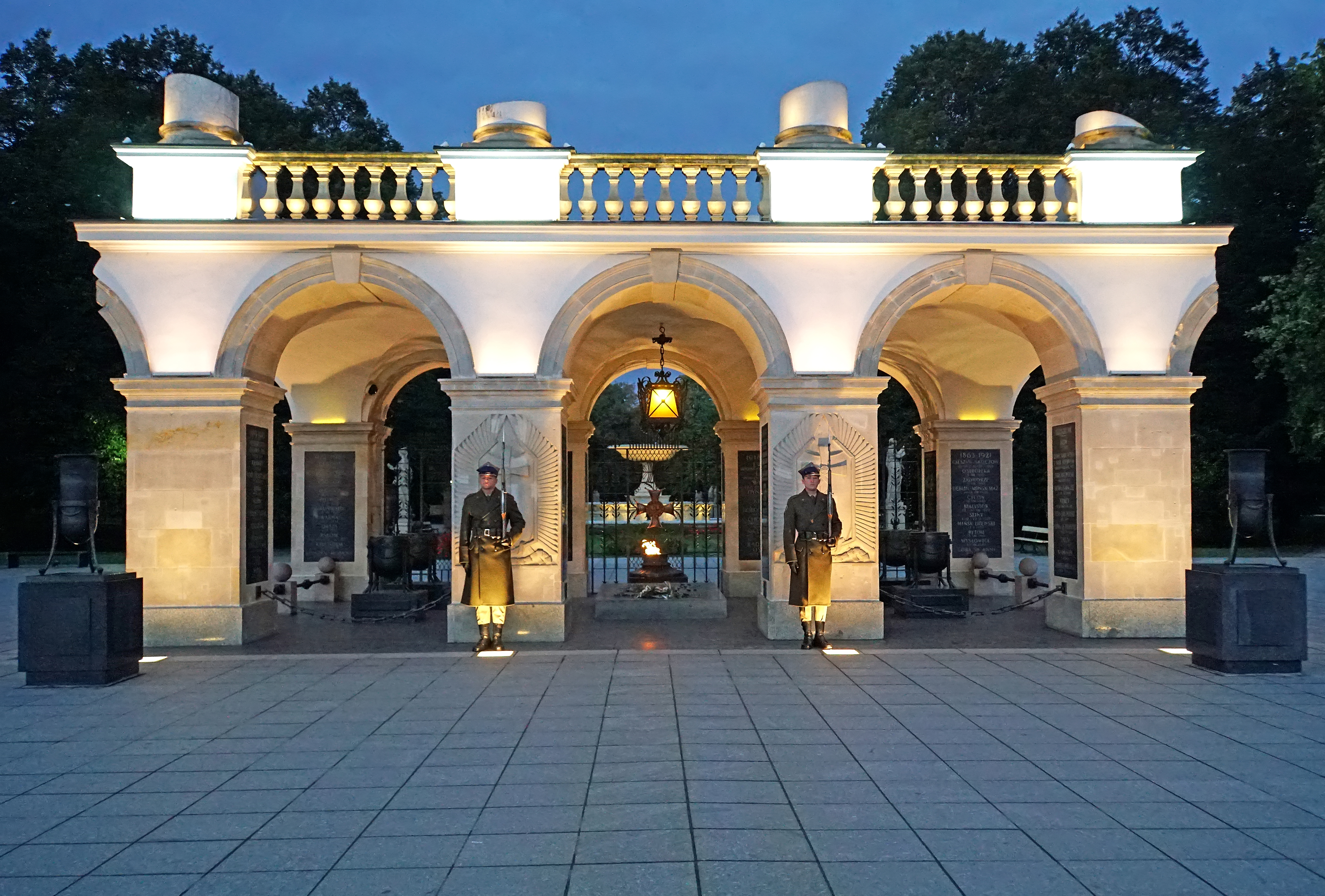
Tomb of the Unknown Soldier, once part of the colonnade of Saxon Palace

Many monuments commemorate heroic and tragic moments in the history of Poland and Warsaw. The Tomb of the Unknown Soldier located in Piłsudski Square was built on the initiative of General Władysław Sikorski in the arcades of the Saxon Palace. In 1925, the ashes of the unknown soldier who died during the defense of Lviv were placed under the colonnade, then urns with soil from 24 battlefields were buried here. Among the monuments related to the World War II are Nike Monument that commemorates the heroes of Warsaw from 1939 to 1945, Monument to the Polish Underground State and Home Army, Monument to the Little Insurrectionist and Warsaw Uprising Monument in front of the Supreme Court building at Krasiński Square. Monument to the Ghetto Heroes commemorates the Warsaw Ghetto Uprising of 1943.

In 1929, a monument to Frédéric Chopin was constructed in the Royal Łazienki Park. Every summer at its foot classical music concerts featuring world-famous pianists take place. Other important monuments are: Adam Mickiewicz Monument, Tadeusz Kościuszko Monument, Marie Curie Monument, Prince Józef Poniatowski Monument, Nicolaus Copernicus Monument, Stefan Starzyński Monument, Józef Piłsudski Monument, Janusz Korczak Monument.

=== Flora and fauna ===
Green space covers almost a quarter of Warsaw's total area. These range from small neighborhood parks and green spaces along streets or in courtyards, to tree-lined avenues, large historic parks, nature conservation areas and urban forests at the fringe of the city. There are as many as 82 parks in the city; the oldest ones were once part of representative palaces and include the Saxon and Krasiński Gardens, Łazienki Park (Royal Baths Park) and Wilanów Palace Parkland.

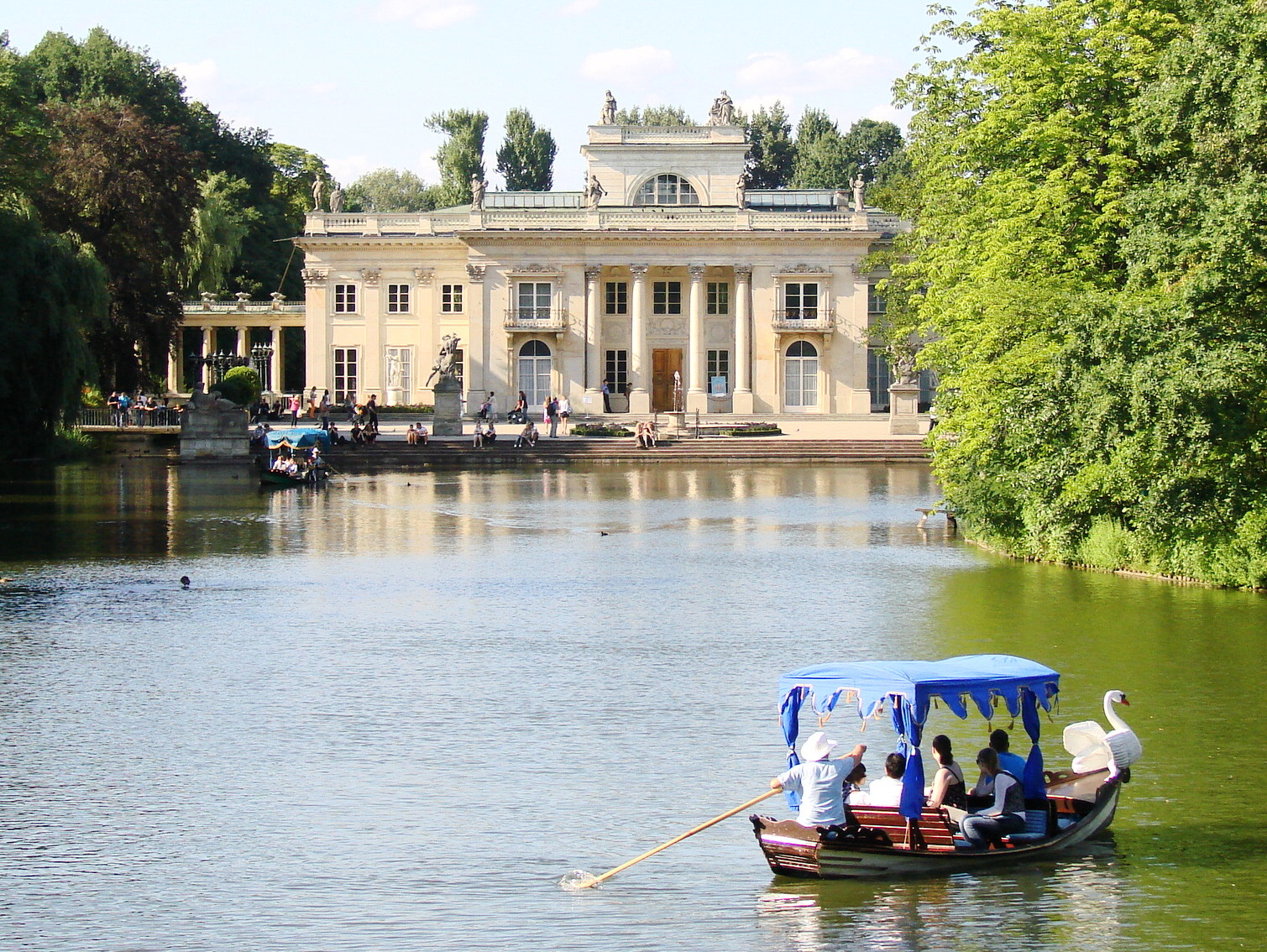
Łazienki Palace, also referred to as the Palace on the Isle

The Saxon Garden, covering an area of 15.5 ha, formally served as a royal garden to the now nonexistent Saxon Palace. In 1727, it was made into one of the world's first public parks and later remodelled in the forest-like English style. The Tomb of the Unknown Soldier is situated at the east end of the park near the central fountain, on Piłsudski Square. With its benches, flower carpets and a central pond, the Krasiński Palace Garden was once a notable strolling destination for most Varsovians. The Łazienki Park covers an area of 76 ha and its unique character and history is reflected in the landscape architecture (pavilions, sculptures, bridges, water cascades) and vegetation (domestic and foreign species of trees and shrubs). The presence of peacocks, pheasants and squirrels at Łazienki attracts tourists and locals. The Wilanów Palace Parkland on the outskirts of Warsaw traces it history to the second half of the 17th century and covers an area of 43 ha. Its French-styled alleys corresponds to the ancient, Baroque forms of the palace.

The Botanical Garden and the University Library rooftop garden host an extensive collection of rare domestic and foreign plants, while a palm house in the New Orangery displays plants of subtropics from all over the world. Mokotów Field (once a racetrack), Ujazdów Park and Skaryszewski Park are also located within the city borders. The oldest park in the Praga borough was established between 1865 and 1871.

The flora of Warsaw may be considered very rich in species on city standards. This is mainly due to the location of Warsaw within the border region of several big floral regions comprising substantial proportions of close-to-wilderness areas (natural forests, wetlands along the Vistula) as well as arable land, meadows and forests. The nearby Kampinos Nature Reserve is the last remaining part of the Masovian Primeval Forest and is protected by law. The Kabaty Woods are by the southern city border and are visited by the residents of southern boroughs such as Ursynów. There are 13 natural reserves in the vicinity and just 15 kilometres (9 miles) from Warsaw, the environment features a perfectly preserved ecosystem with a habitat of animals like the otter, beavers and hundreds of bird species. There are also several lakes in Warsaw – mainly the oxbow lakes at Czerniaków and Kamionek.

The Warsaw Zoo covers an area of 40 hectares (99 acres). There are about 5,000 animals representing nearly 500 species. Although officially created in 1928, it traces back its roots to 17th century private menageries, often open to the public.

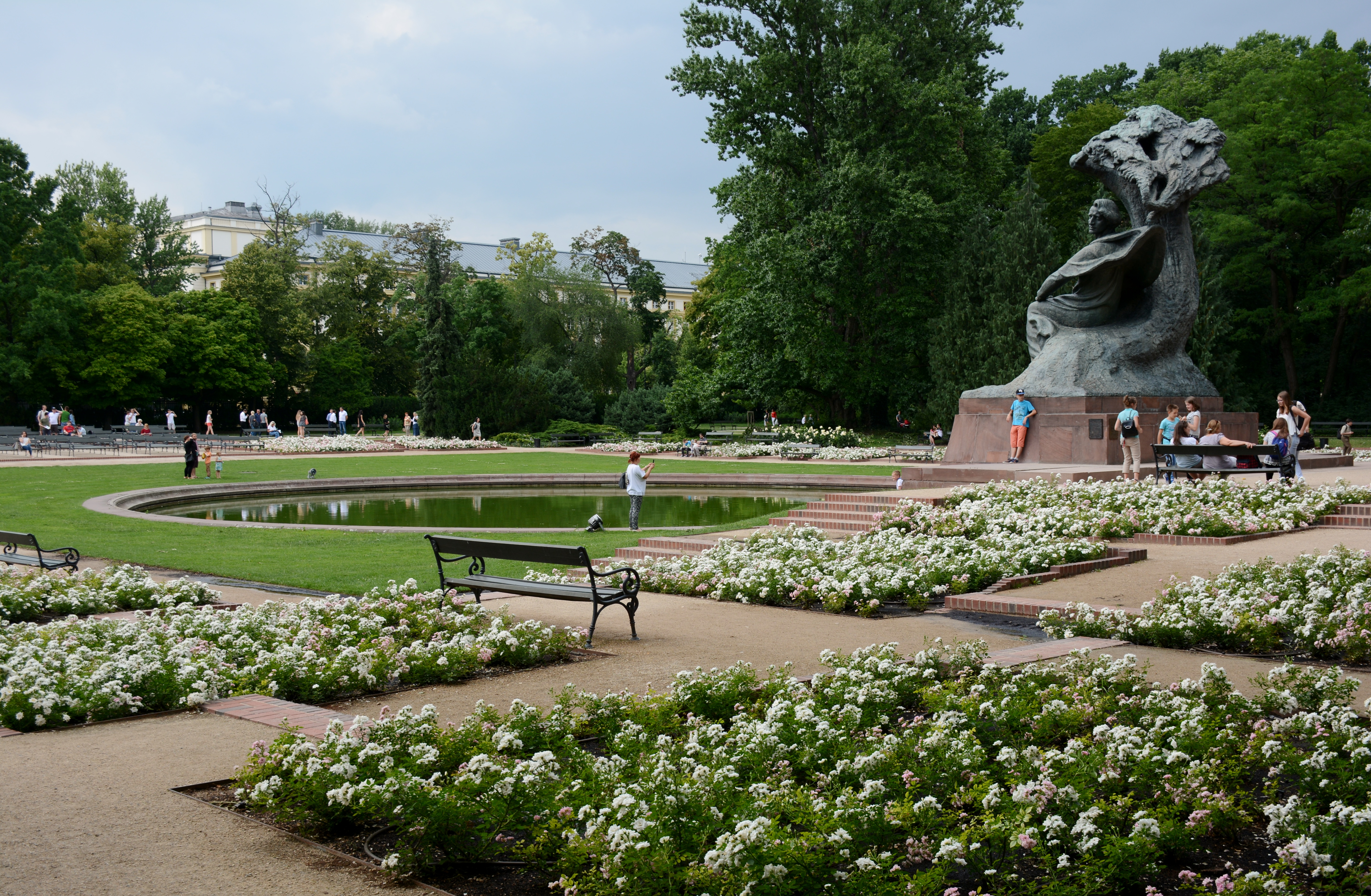
Frédéric Chopin's monument in Łazienki Park

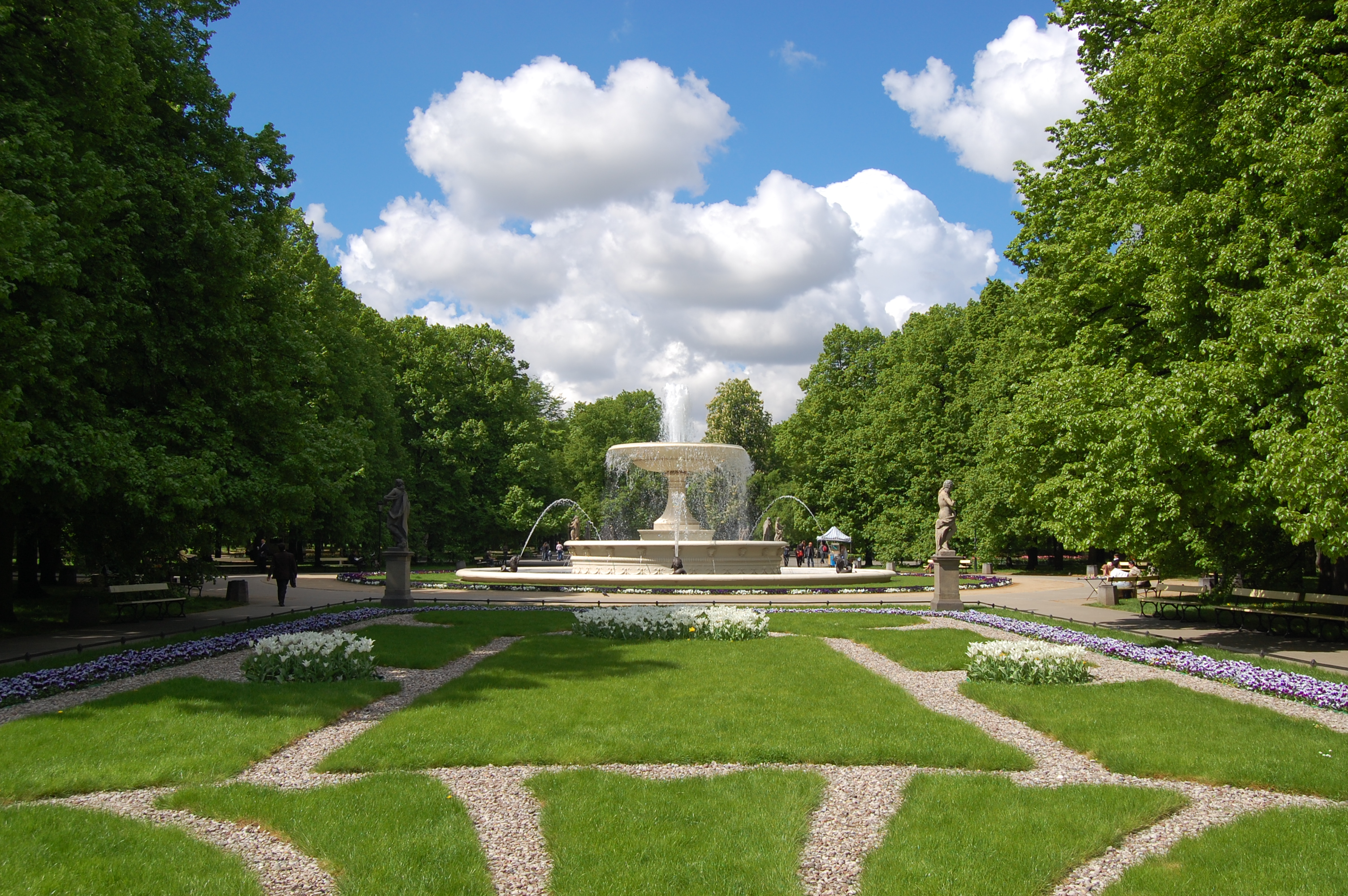
Saxon Garden with the central fountain

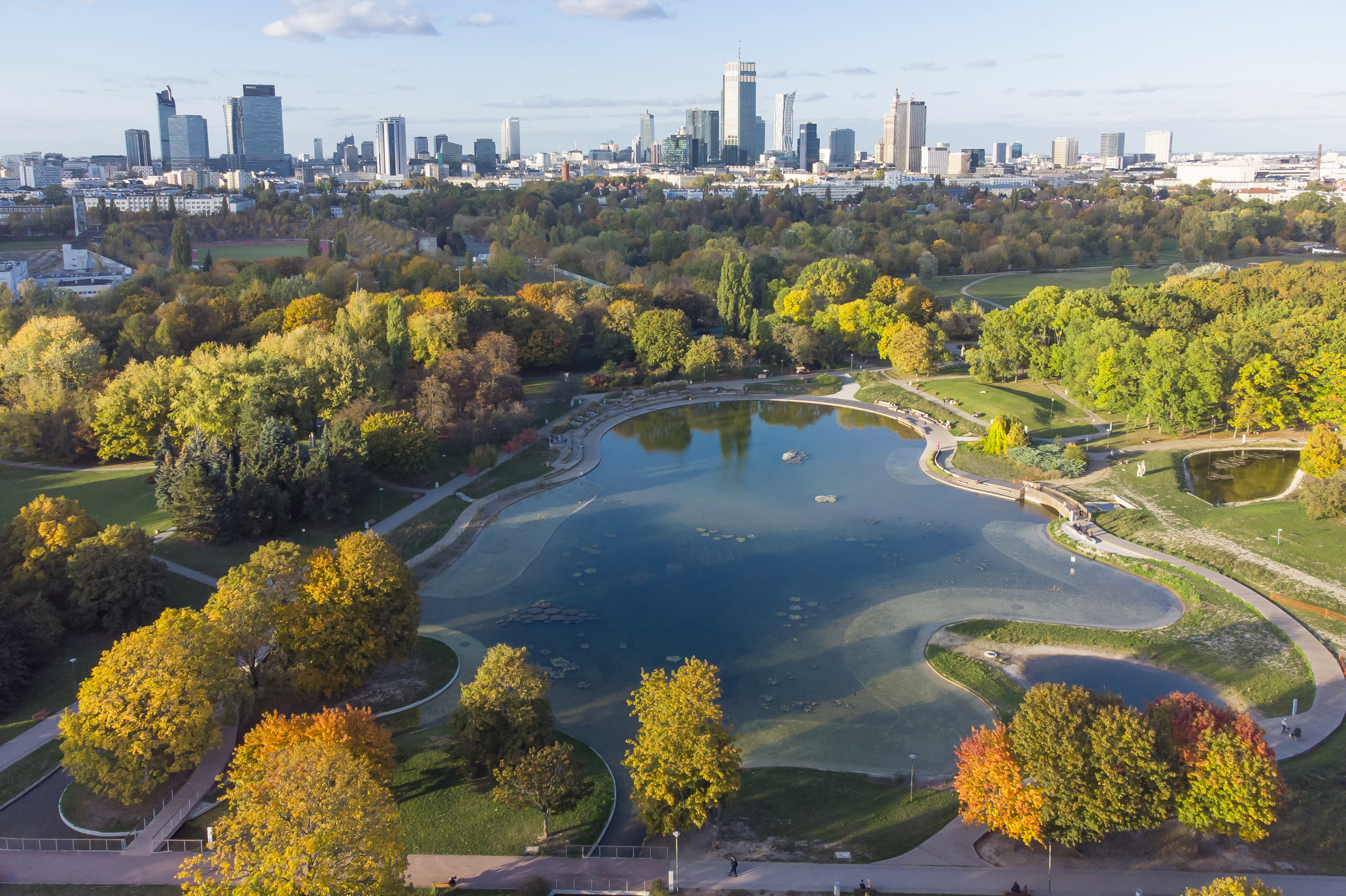
Mokotów Field, with Warsaw's skyline

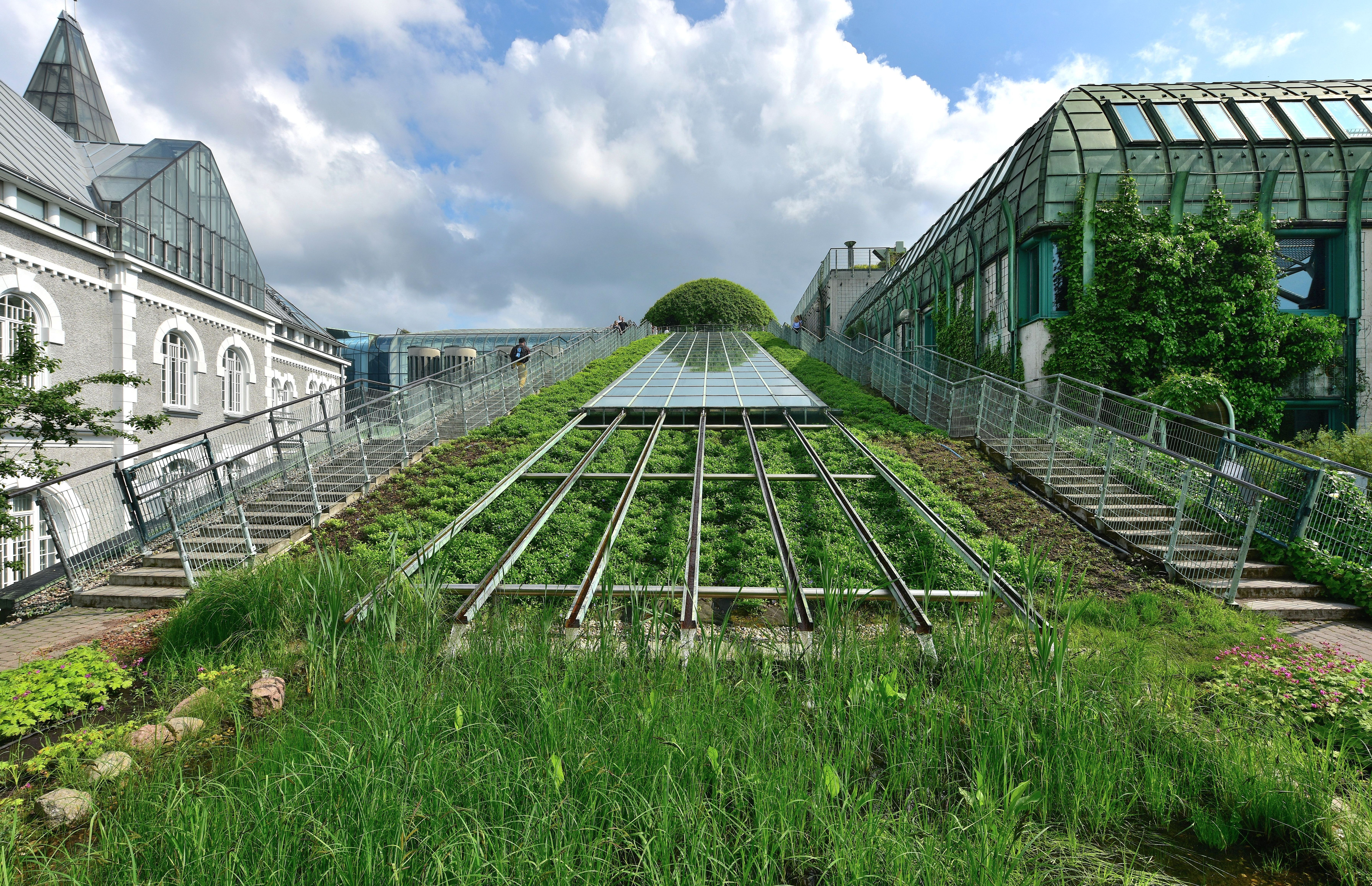
Botanical garden on the roof of University Library

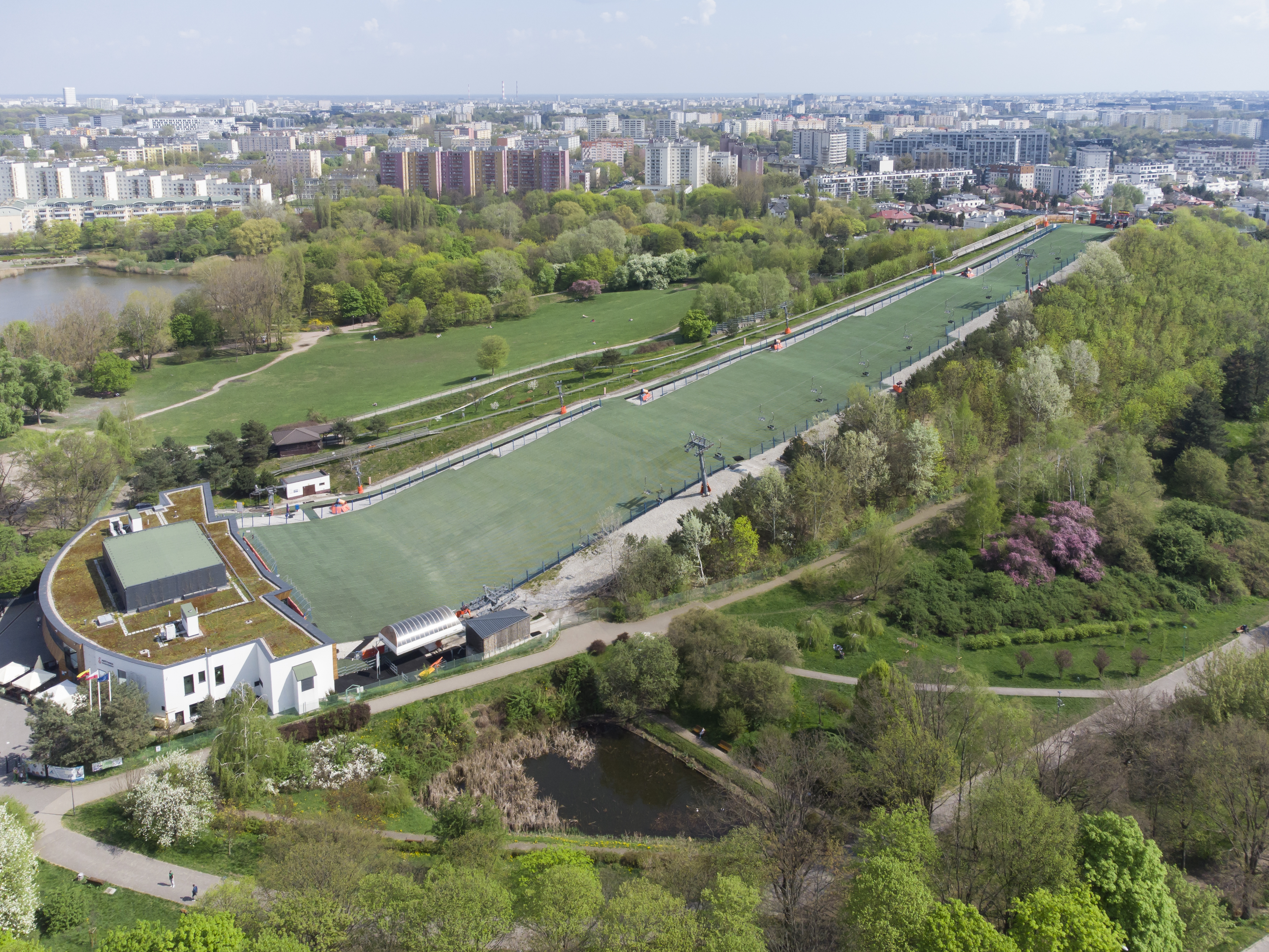
Artificial hill in Szczęśliwice Park, with a ski slope

== Demographics ==
Warsaw population pyramid in 2021

Demographically, Warsaw was the most diverse city in Poland. Prior to World War II, Warsaw hosted the world's second largest Jewish population after New York – approximately 30 percent of the city's total population in the late 1930s. In 1933, 833,500 out of 1,178,914 people declared Polish as their mother tongue. There was also a notable German community. The ethnic composition of contemporary Warsaw is incomparable to the diversity that existed for nearly 300 years. Most of the modern-day population growth is based on internal migration and urbanisation. In the 2021 census, 98.78% of Warsaw residents identified themselves as Polish, 0.46% as Ukrainian, 0.31% as Belarusian and 0.21% as Jewish.

Historical population
| Year | Pop. | ±% |
|---|---|---|
| 1700 | 30,000 | — |
| 1792 | 120,000 | +300.0% |
| 1800 | 63,400 | −47.2% |
| 1830 | 139,700 | +120.3% |
| 1850 | 163,600 | +17.1% |
| 1882 | 383,000 | +134.1% |
| 1901 | 711,988 | +85.9% |
| 1909 | 764,054 | +7.3% |
| 1925 | 1,003,000 | +31.3% |
| 1933 | 1,178,914 | +17.5% |
| 1939 | 1,300,900 | +10.3% |
| 1945 | 422,000 | −67.6% |
| 1950 | 803,888 | +90.5% |
| 1960 | 1,139,189 | +41.7% |
| 1970 | 1,314,892 | +15.4% |
| 1978 | 1,555,406 | +18.3% |
| 1988 | 1,655,272 | +6.4% |
| 2002 | 1,689,201 | +2.0% |
| 2011 | 1,700,612 | +0.7% |
| 2021 | 1,860,281 | +9.4% |

Foreign residents (2024)
| Nationality | Population |
|---|---|
| Ukraine | 102,634 |
| Belarus | 41,834 |
| Vietnam | 7,773 |
| India | 7,438 |
| Russia | 6,032 |
| Turkey | 4,179 |
| China | 4,037 |
| Georgia | 3,867 |
| France | 2,088 |
| Italy | 1,891 |

In 1939, approximately 1,300,000 people resided in Warsaw; by 1945 the population had dropped to 420,000. During the first years after the war, the population growth rate was high and the city soon began to suffer from the lack of flats and dwellings to house new incomers. The first remedial measure was the enlargement of Warsaw's total area (1951) – however the city authorities were still forced to introduce limitations; only the spouses and children of permanent residents as well as some persons of public importance (renowned specialists, artists, engineers) were permitted to stay. This negatively affected the image of an average Warsaw citizen, who was perceived as more privileged than those migrating from rural areas, towns or other cities. While all restrictions on residency registration were scrapped in 1990, the negative opinion of Varsovians in some form continues to this day.

Warsaw metropolitan area is an example of the development of a strongly polarized region. The capital, along with its immediate surroundings, concentrates over half of the demographic potential of the Masovian Voivodeship, 2/3 of residents with higher education, and 3/4 of larger economic entities employing more than 50 workers. Current demographic development trends are as follows:

- a clear increase in the number of residents after the 1989 transformations, from 1.6 to about 2.0 million inhabitants (including unregistered population), mainly due to positive migration balance.
- the highest migration attractiveness in the country for many decades, causing a strong drain of people in the mobile age (18–44 years), including a relatively more frequent influx of women, resulting in high feminization
- processes of internal deconcentration of population, consisting of centrifugal migration direction (from central districts to external ones, from external districts to suburban areas). Between 1989 and 2017, 213 thousand registered people moved from Warsaw to the suburbs, and in the opposite direction it was only 110 thousand.
- a clear aging of the population: at the end of 2017, people aged 60 and over constituted 27.2% of the registered population, and those aged 70 and over – 13.5%, while for example in 2002, it was respectively 21.5 and 11.5%

In the coming years, an increase in the city's population is predicted, with migration being the main factor determining the state and structure of Warsaw's population, including mainly internal (national) and external (foreign) influx. Changes in the population are not uniform for the entire Warsaw and in the division into districts, the predicted demographic changes will have a varied course. A decrease in population is forecasted in some central districts (Praga-Północ, Śródmieście) and an increase in other districts.

=== Immigrant population ===
In 2019, it was estimated that 40,000 people living in Warsaw were foreign-born. Of those, Ukrainians, Vietnamese, Belarusians, and Russians were the most prominent groups. After the 2022 Russian invasion of Ukraine, over 1.1 million refugees from Ukraine passed through Warsaw, and at the beginning of March 2022, approximately 40,000 people applied for help every day. According to official data, over 104,000 of Ukrainian citizens who arrived in the first days after the outbreak of the war still reside in the city, including 17,000 young people and children attending urban educational institutions. Due to the Russo-Ukrainian war, the immigrant population has increased significantly to about 340,000.

=== Religion ===
Religion in Warsaw (2021)
1. Catholicism (51.0%)
2. Protestantism (0.60%)
3. Eastern Orthodoxy (0.40%)
4. Other Christian (0.10%)
5. Other (0.20%)
6. Undeclared (29.0%)
7. Irreligion (19.0%)

Throughout its existence, Warsaw had been a multi-cultural and multi-religious city. According to the 1901 census, out of 711,988 inhabitants 56.2% were Catholics, 35.7% Jews, 5% Greek Orthodox Christians and 2.8% Protestants. Eight years later, in 1909, there were 281,754 Jews (36.9%), 18,189 Protestants (2.4%) and 2,818 Mariavites (0.4%). This led to construction of hundreds of places of religious worship in all parts of the town. Most of them were destroyed in the aftermath of the Warsaw Uprising in 1944. After the war, the new communist authorities of Poland discouraged church construction and only a small number were rebuilt.

The archdiocese of Warsaw and the Diocese of Warsaw-Praga are the two ecclesiastical districts active in the city which serve the large Roman Catholic population of 1.4 million. The Lutheran Diocese of Warsaw is one of six in Poland; its main house of worship is the Holy Trinity Church from 1782, one of Warsaw's most important and historic landmarks. The Evangelical Reformed Parish (Calvinist) is leading the Polish Reformed Church. The main tserkva of the Orthodox Christians is Praga's Cathedral of St. Mary Magdalene from 1869. The Jewish Religious Community of Warsaw is one of eight in the country; Chief Rabbi of Poland Michael Schudrich resides in the city. There are also 3 active synagogues, one of which is the pre-war Nożyk Synagogue designated for Orthodox Jews. An Islamic Cultural Centre in Ochota and a small mosque in Wilanów serve the Muslims.

There are several Marian shrines in the city, including: sanctuary of the Gracious Mother of God with her image crowned in 1651 in the presence of King John Casimir. Another patron of the city is Blessed Władysław of Gielniów, bernardine from the St. Anne's Church. The greatest cult is that of St. Andrew Bobola, patron of the metropolis of Warsaw, whose relics are in the sanctuary of St. Andrew Bobola in Mokotów.

== Government and politics ==
As the capital of Poland, Warsaw is the political centre of the country. Almost all central government institutions are located there, including the Chancellery of the President, both houses of the Polish Parliament (the lower house called Sejm and the upper house called Senate), the Chancellery of the Prime Minister, the Constitutional Tribunal, the Supreme Court, and the Supreme Administrative Court. Warsaw is also host to many major international organizations, including Frontex and the Office for Democratic Institutions and Human Rights (the oldest and principal institution of the Organization for Security and Co-operation in Europe).

The city is represented in the parliament by 20 members of Sejm (out of 460) and 4 senators (out of 100). In addition, Warsaw together with its metropolitan area elects 6 MEPs (Members of the European Parliament) out of 705.

=== Municipal government ===
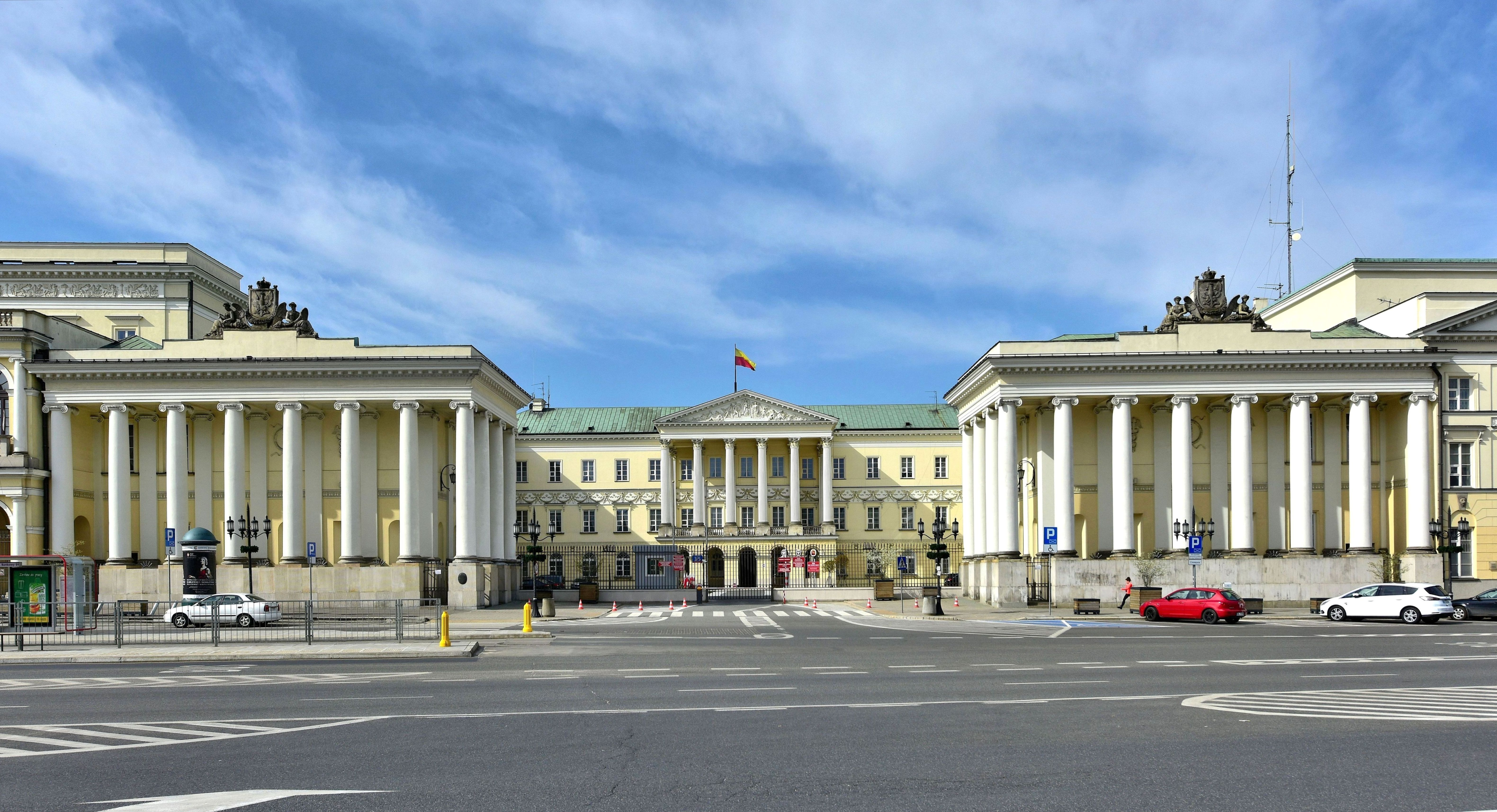
Commission Palace at Bank Square. It serves as the official city hall as well as the seat of the Mayor of Warsaw.

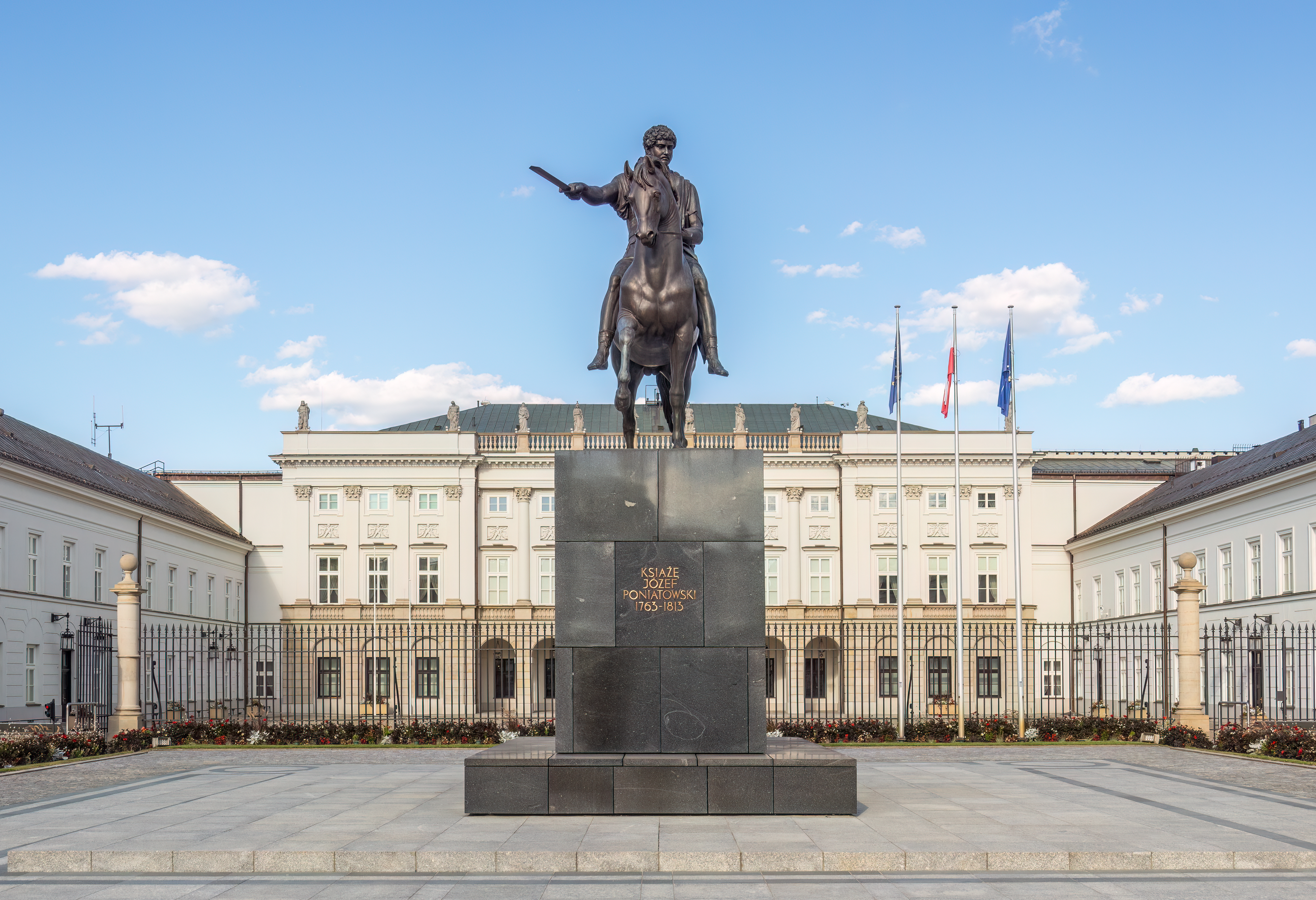
Presidential Palace is the official seat of the President of Poland.

The first city mayor of Warsaw was Jan Andrzej Menich (1695–1696). The municipal self-government existed in Warsaw until World War II and was restored in 1990 (during the communist times, the National City Council – Miejska Rada Narodowa – governed in Warsaw). Since 1990, the structure of city government has been modified several times. Between 1975 and 1990 the Warsaw city mayors simultaneously led the Warsaw Voivodeship. In the years 1990–1994, the city mayor of Warsaw was elected by the city council.

A controversial reform was introduced in 1994, which transformed the city into a loose municipal union of several gminas, dominated by one of them, the gmina Centrum encompassing the entire inner city. During this period, the mayor of gmina Centrum who was elected by its council was automatically designated as the city mayor of Warsaw, in spite of representing only a fraction of the population of the city. The city was becoming increasingly unmanageable, especially after the administrative reform of Poland in 1999 which further complicated the local government structure of Warsaw. In 2002, the new Warsaw Act of the Polish parliament restored Warsaw as a single urban gmina with the status of a city with powiat rights, led by a unified local government. At the same time, a significant reform was implemented in all Polish municipal governments, introducing direct elections of the wójt/town mayor/city mayor in all Polish gminas. The first city mayor of Warsaw elected according to these rules was Lech Kaczyński, who however resigned ahead of term when he was elected President of Polish Republic in 2005.

Warsaw has thereafter remained an urban gmina with the status of a city with powiat rights. Legislative power in Warsaw is vested in a unicameral Warsaw City Council (Rada Miasta), which comprises 60 members. Council members are elected directly every five years (since 2018 election). Like most legislative bodies, the city council divides itself into committees which have the oversight of various functions of the city government. The city mayor exercises the executive power in the city, being the superior of all unelected municipal- or county-level officials and other employees and supervising all subsidiary entities of the city. The incumbent city mayor of Warsaw is Rafał Trzaskowski.

The Warsaw Act imposes a mandatory division into 18 auxiliary units called dzielnica (district) on the city. In spite of remaining an integral part of the city as an entity, the districts have a degree of autonomy legally guaranteed through a form of an own local self-government exercising some powers devolved by law from the city. They have the duty to assist the city mayor and the City Council in their tasks, such as supervising some municipal companies, city-owned property or schools. Each of the 18 city districts has an own council (rada dzielnicy) which elects an executive board (zarząd dzielnicy) headed by a district mayor (burmistrz dzielnicy), the latter elected by the council among several candidates nominated by the city mayor of Warsaw among the council's members.

=== Districts ===
| District | Population | Area |
|---|---|---|
| Mokotów | 225,496 | 35.42 km^{2} (13.68 sq mi) |
| Praga Południe | 186,623 | 22.38 km^{2} (8.64 sq mi) |
| Białołęka | 154,596 | 73.00 km^{2} (28.19 sq mi) |
| Ursynów | 151,345 | 43.79 km^{2} (16.91 sq mi) |
| Wola | 150,977 | 19.26 km^{2} (7.44 sq mi) |
| Bielany | 132,803 | 32.34 km^{2} (12.49 sq mi) |
| Bemowo | 128,995 | 24.95 km^{2} (9.63 sq mi) |
| Targówek | 123,957 | 24.33 km^{2} (9.39 sq mi) |
| Śródmieście | 101,030 | 15.57 km^{2} (6.01 sq mi) |
| Wawer | 86,854 | 79.71 km^{2} (30.78 sq mi) |
| Ochota | 80,587 | 9.72 km^{2} (3.75 sq mi) |
| Ursus | 67,814 | 9.35 km^{2} (3.61 sq mi) |
| Praga Północ | 60,387 | 11.31 km^{2} (4.37 sq mi) |
| Żoliborz | 58,724 | 8.47 km^{2} (3.27 sq mi) |
| Wilanów | 51,603 | 36.73 km^{2} (14.18 sq mi) |
| Włochy | 49,332 | 28.63 km^{2} (11.05 sq mi) |
| Wesoła | 26,454 | 22.94 km^{2} (8.86 sq mi) |
| Rembertów | 24,768 | 19.30 km^{2} (7.45 sq mi) |
| Total | 1,862,345 | 521.81 km^{2} (201.47 sq mi) |

As a result, Warsaw has thereafter continued as an urban gmina holding status of a city with powiat rights, divided into 18 districts (dzielnica), auxiliary municipal units established within the city as an entity as its integral parts, though with some limited powers devolved from the city to their own local self-governments. Each of the districts is customarily subdivided into several neighbourhoods lacking any meaningful legal or administrative powers. The central district of Śródmieście includes the two founding neighbourhoods of the city, called the Old Town (Stare Miasto) and the New Town (Nowe Miasto).

Districts of Warsaw

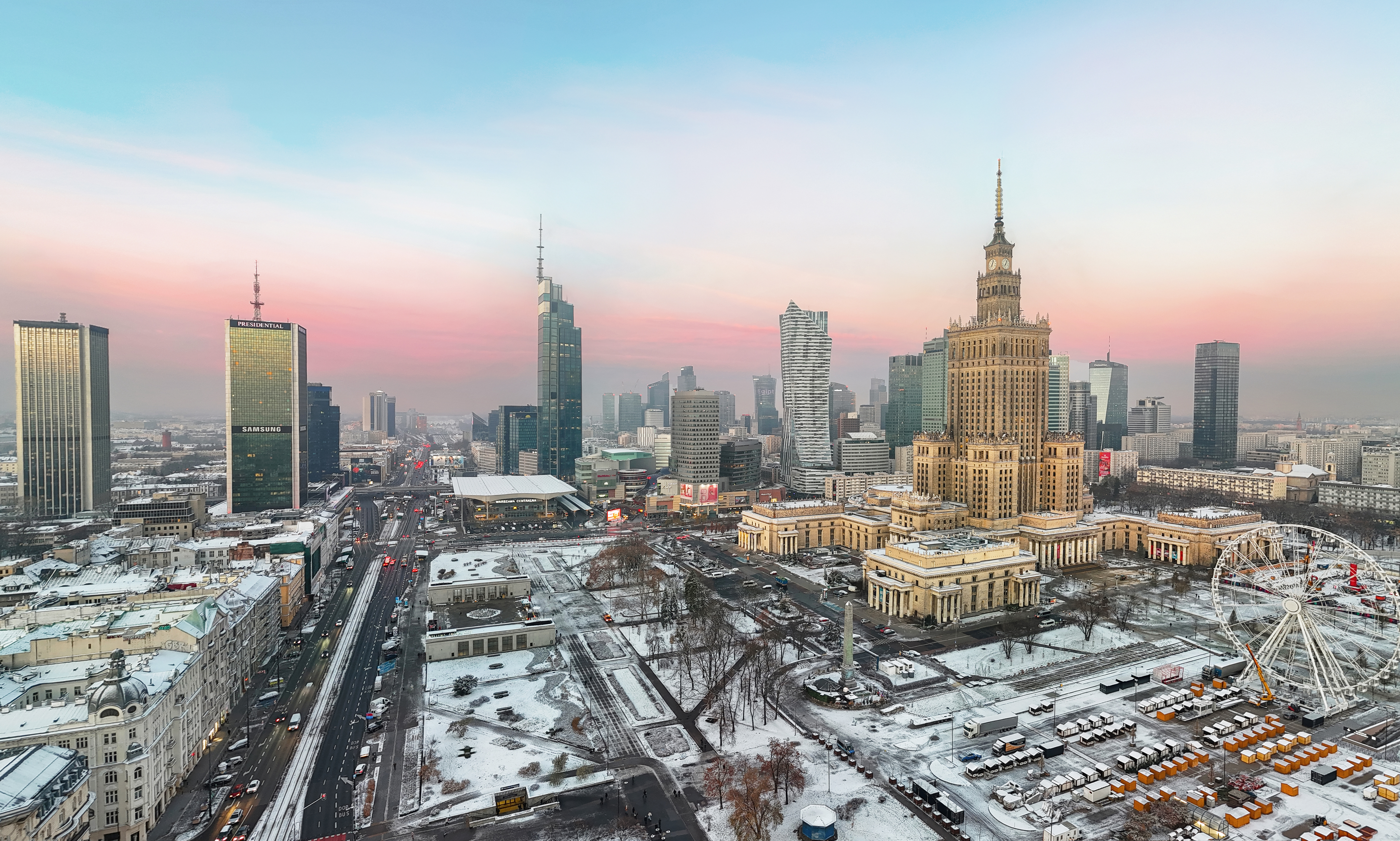
Śródmieście, the central district of Warsaw, houses the most important state and municipal institutions and most tourist attractions.

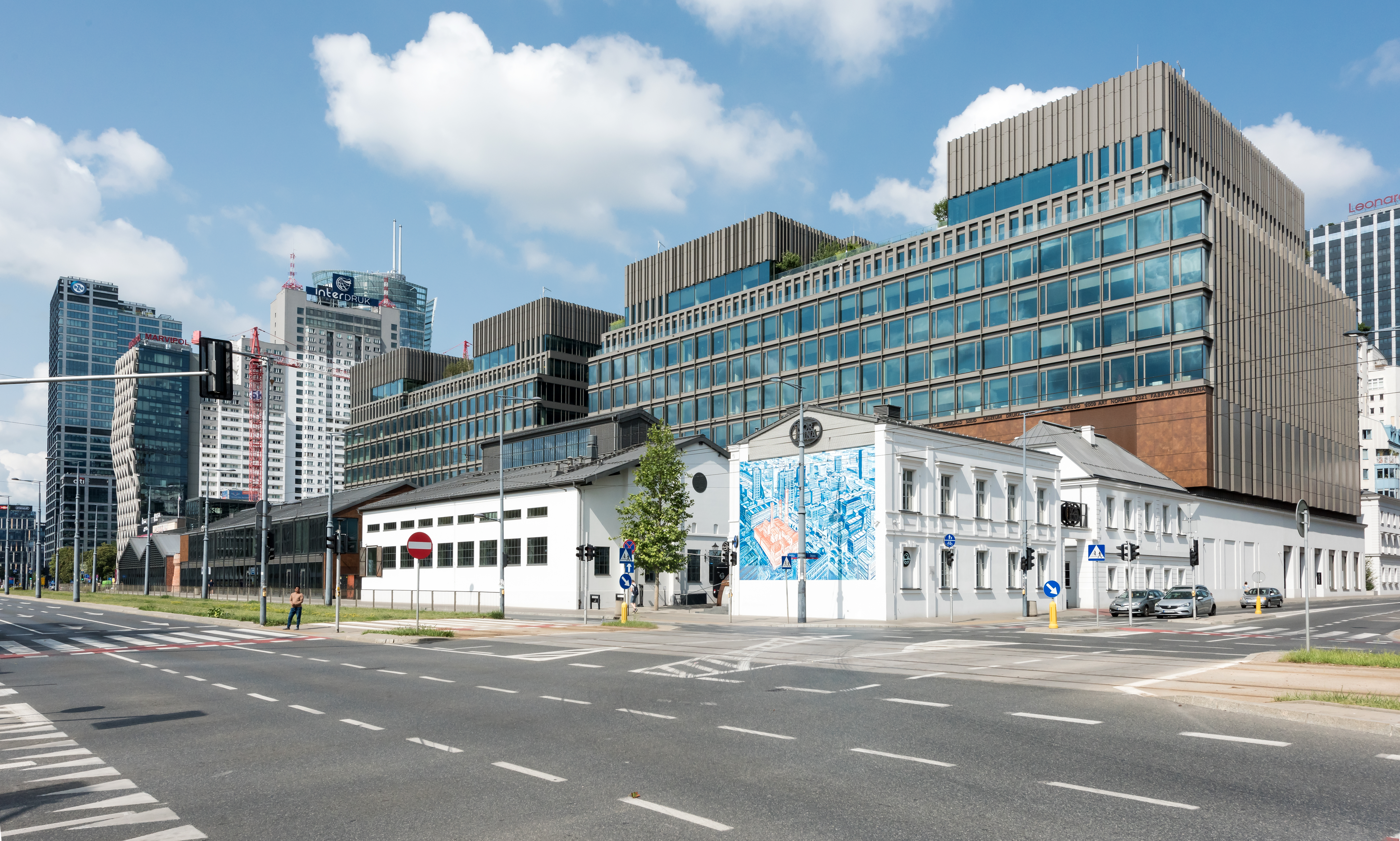
Wola, once an industrial district, is now becoming the business centre of the capital. The photo shows the revitalized Norblin Factory.

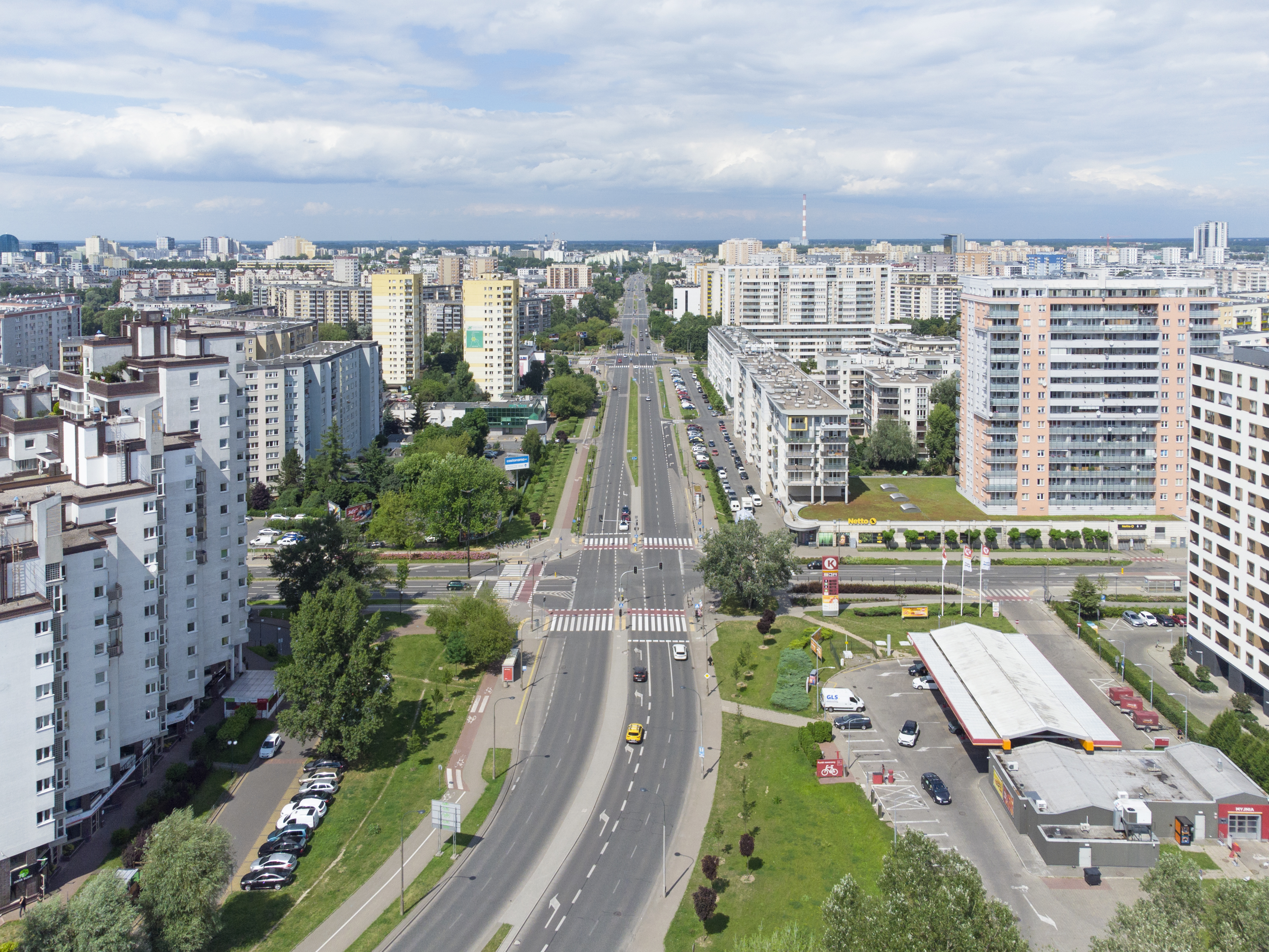
Praga-Południe, the most densely populated district of Warsaw (8,839 people/km^{2}), is composed mainly of apartment blocks built during the times of the Polish People's Republic.

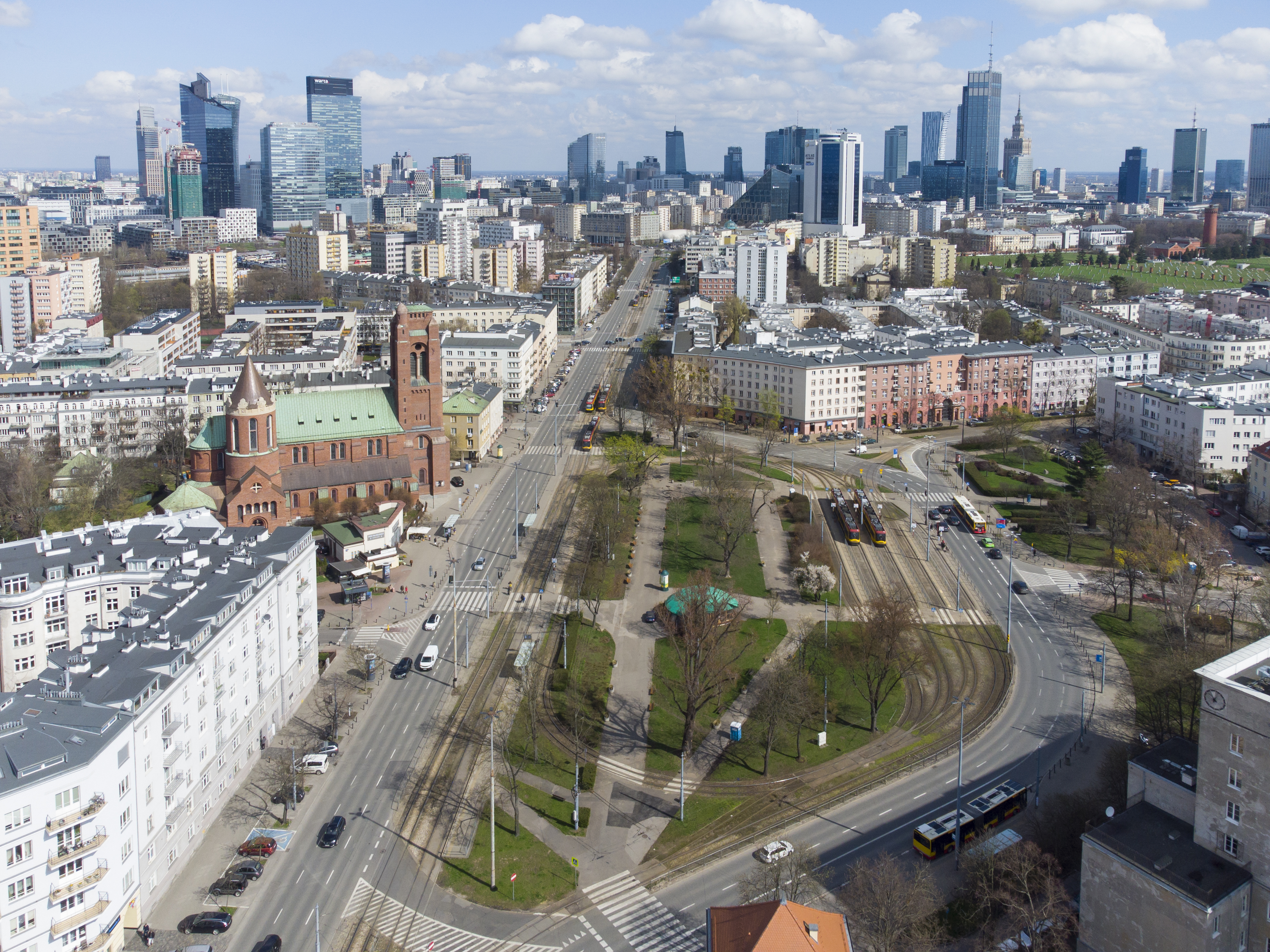
Ochota, a residential district that developed most intensively in the interwar period. The photo shows Narutowicz Square, the central point of the district.

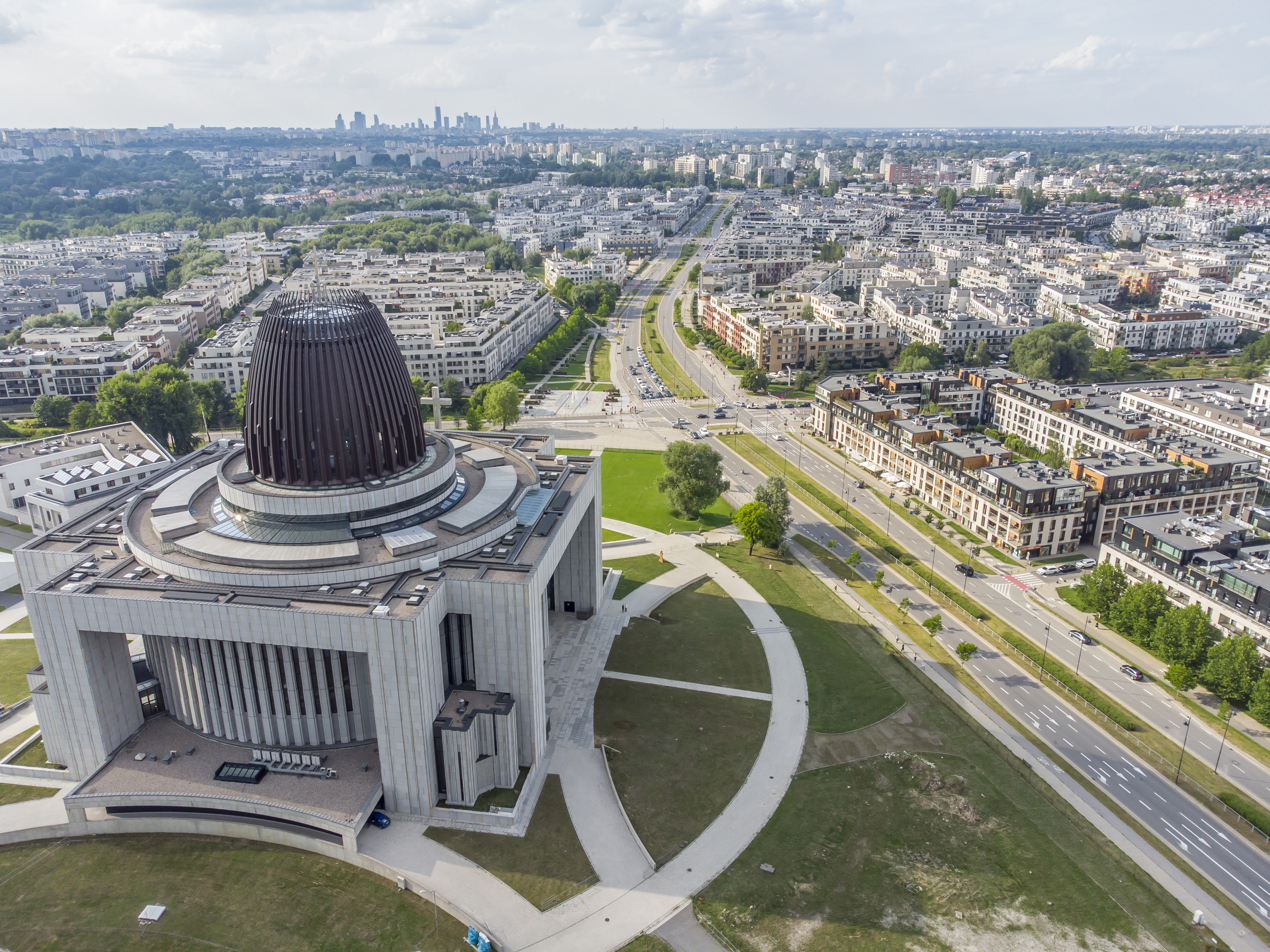
Wilanów, the district with the highest rate of natural increase (7.2/1000 inhabitants).

== Economy ==
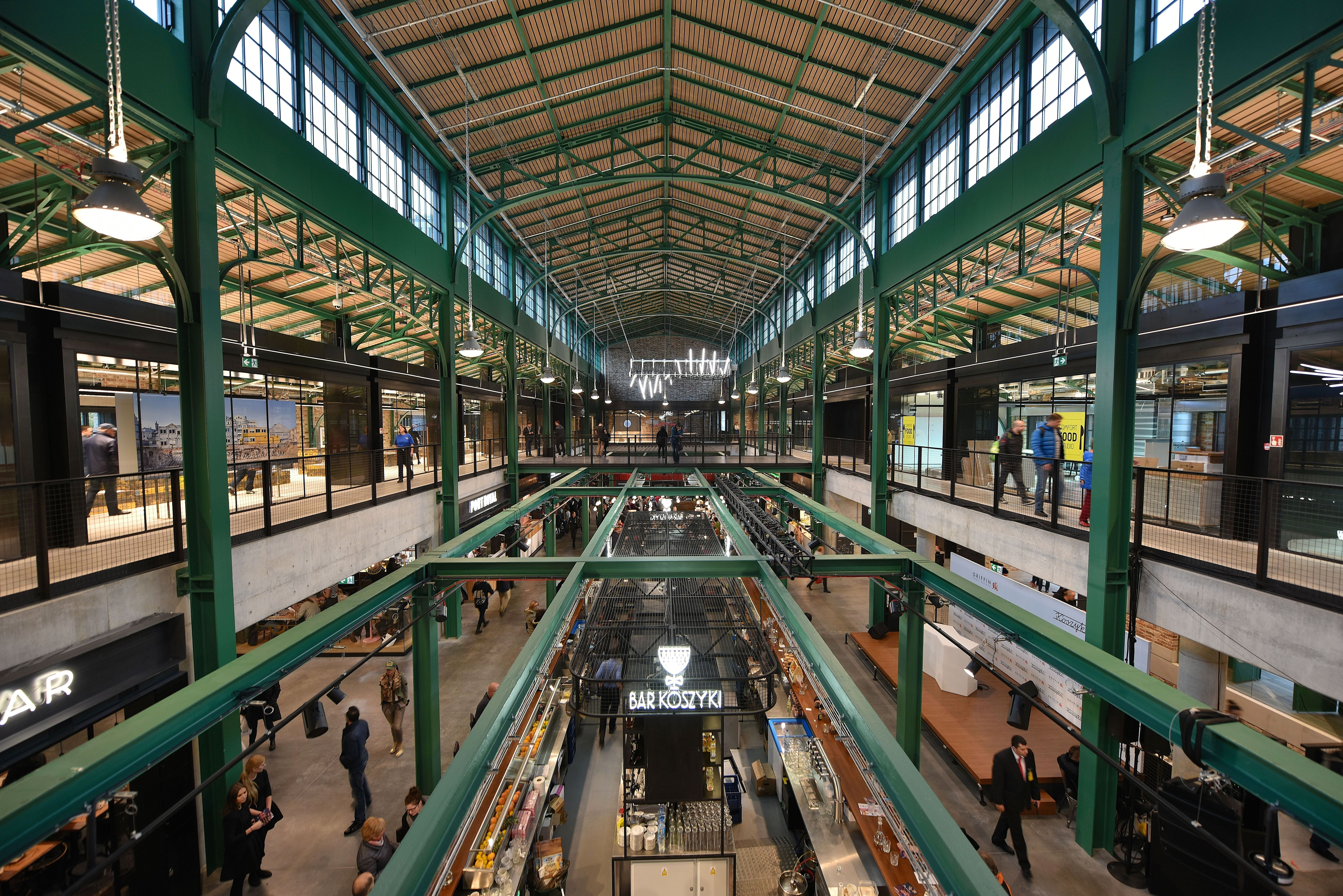
Hala Koszyki, a former market hall from the early 20th century, now a mixed-use centre

Warsaw is the leading economic and financial hub of the Visegrád Group and the Three Seas Initiative. In 2021, the city's gross metropolitan product (GDP) was estimated at €100 billion, which places Warsaw 20th among the metropolitan areas in the European Union with largest GDP. Warsaw generates almost 1/5 of the Polish GDP and the country's national income. In 2020, Warsaw was classified as a global city, because Warsaw is a major global city that links economic regions into the world economy.

Warsaw's city centre (Śródmieście) and commercial Wola district are home not only to many national institutions and government agencies, but also to many domestic and international companies. Warsaw has a quickly growing business community. In 2019, Warsaw was one of the top destinations for foreign investors in Europe.

The average monthly gross salary in the enterprise sector in the last quarter of 2022 amounted to 8,104 PLN and was 404 PLN higher than the average in the Masovian Voivodeship and as much as 1,450 PLN higher than in Poland. The highest gross salary was received by employees working in the information and communication section (11,701.47 PLN). There are 525,475 registered business entities in Warsaw, most of them in the districts of Śródmieście, Mokotów, Wola and Praga-Południe, 1.1 million people work in the enterprise sector. Warsaw has a well-developed office base, the office space is 6.27 million m2. The largest office buildings are Varso (63,800 m^{2}), Warsaw Spire (60,000 m^{2}), Forest Tower (51,500 m^{2}) and P180 (32,000 m^{2}), the largest projects under construction are The Bridge (47,000 m^{2}) and Skyliner II (38,000 m^{2}). The space resources of shopping centres in the Warsaw agglomeration in amount to over 1.7 million m^{2}.

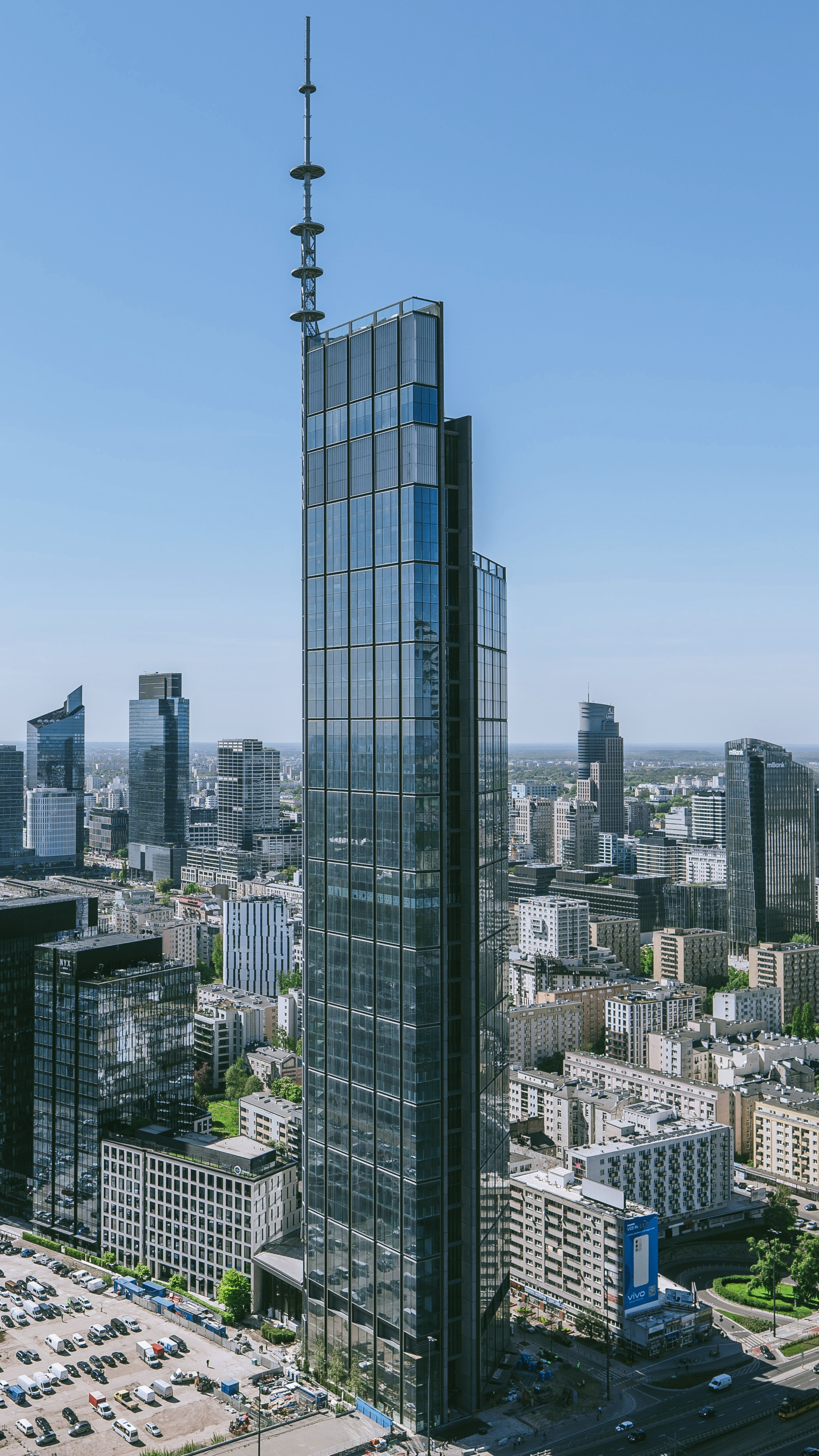
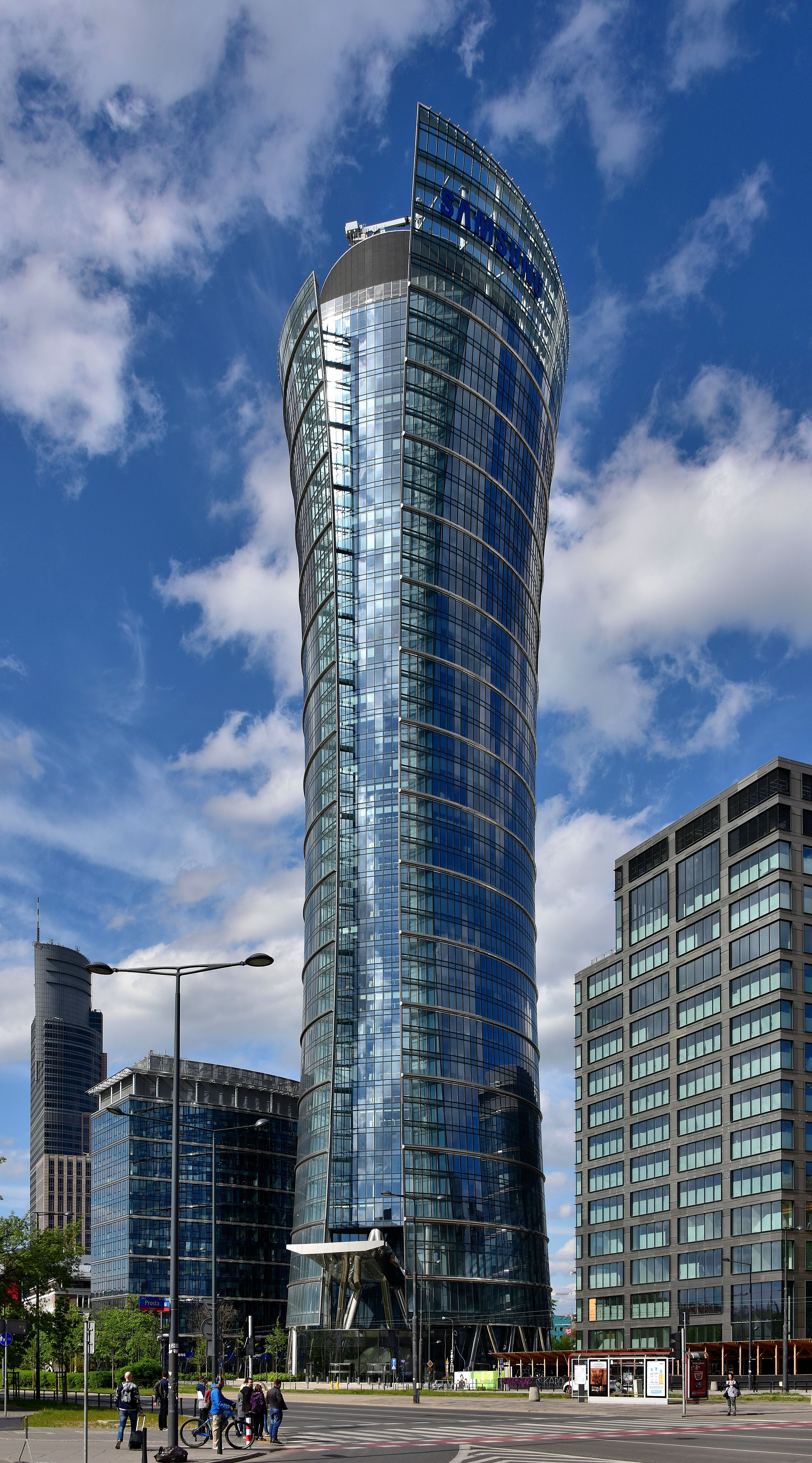
Varso and Warsaw Spire are the skyscrapers with the largest office space

In October 2019 Warsaw's unemployment rate was 1.3%, the lowest in the country. Shopping and consumerism is an important component of Warsaw's economy. The retail streets in Warsaw are New World Street (Nowy Świat) along with Krakowskie Przedmieście. These streets and their neighboring areas host many luxury stores and popular restaurants. However, most retailers choose to operate in the central shopping centres and malls such as Złote Tarasy-Golden Terraces, Galeria Mokotów and Westfield Arkadia. Luxury goods as well as designer labels can be found in the Vitkac Department Store and around Frascati.

=== Warsaw Stock Exchange ===
Warsaw's first stock exchange was established in 1817 and continued trading until World War II. It was re-established in April 1991, following the end of a communist planned economy and the reintroduction of a free-market economy. Today, the Warsaw Stock Exchange (WSE) is, according to many indicators, the largest market in the region, with 433 companies listed and total capitalisation of 1 trillion PLN as of 26 November 2020. From 1991 until 2000, the stock exchange was, ironically, located in the building previously used as the headquarters of the communist Polish United Workers' Party (PZPR).

=== Industry ===
The most prominent industries and industrial sectors include high-tech, electrotechnical, chemical, cosmetic, construction, food processing, printing, metallurgy, machinery and clothing. The majority of production plants and facilities are concentrated within the WOP Warsaw Industrial Precinct (Warszawski Okręg Przemysłowy) which is situated around the city's peripheral localities such as Praga, Pruszków, Sochaczew, Piaseczno, Marki and Żyrardów. Warsaw has developed a particularly strong retail market/sector, representing around 13% of the total retail stock in the country.

Following World War II, the authorities decided that the city will be transformed into a major centre for heavy industry and manufacturing. As a result, numerous large factories and production facilities were built in and around the city. Among the largest were Huta Warszawa steel works, now arcelor, the Ursus SA, and the Fabryka Samochodów Osobowych (FSO) car factory. The now-defunct FSO, established in 1951, was once Warsaw's most successful corporation. Notable vehicles assembled there over the decades include the FSO Warszawa, FSO Syrena, Polski Fiat 125p and the FSO Polonez. In 1995, the factory was purchased by the South Korean car manufacturer Daewoo, which assembled its models in Warsaw for the European market.

=== Tourism ===
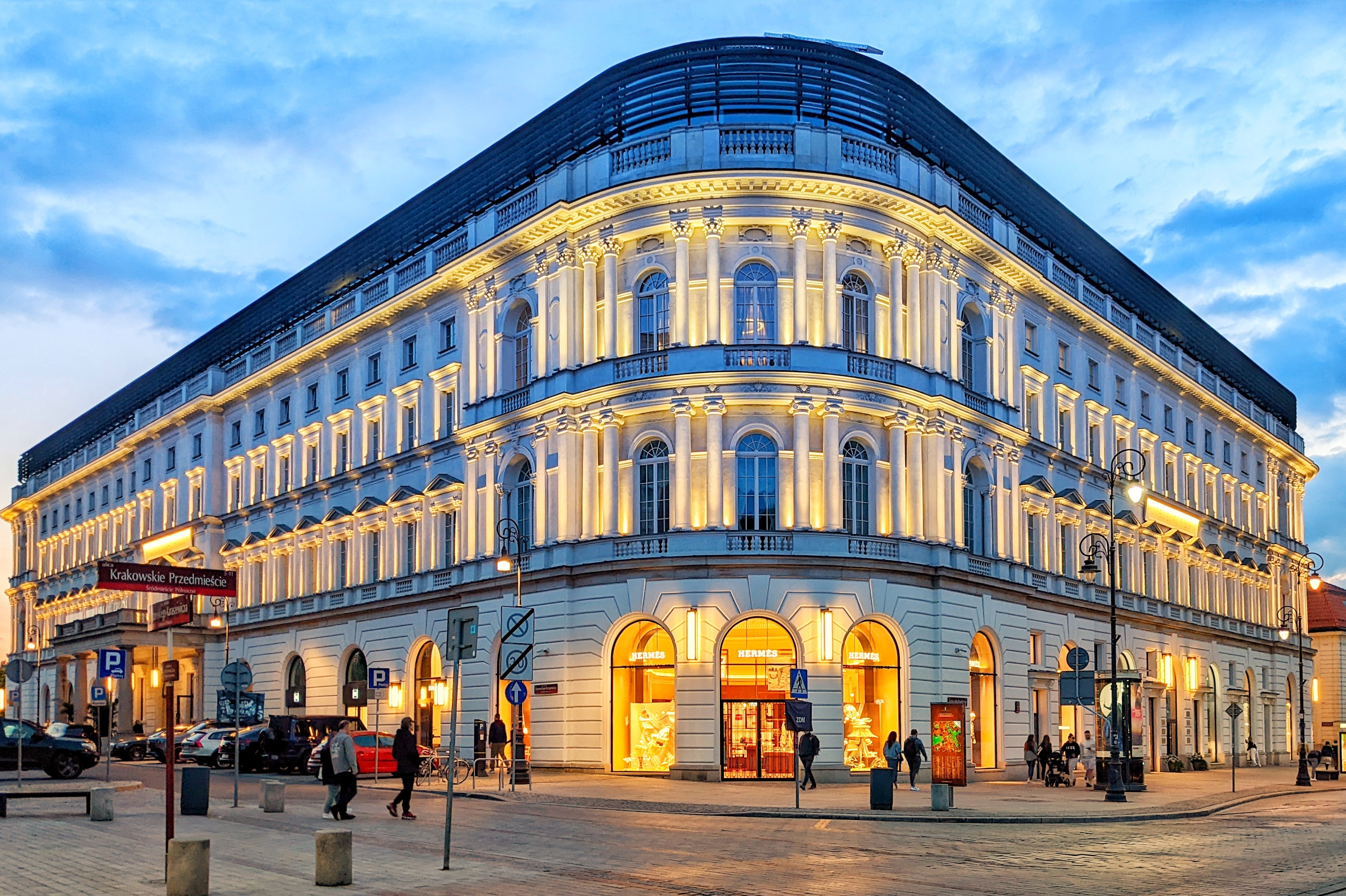
Hotel Europejski

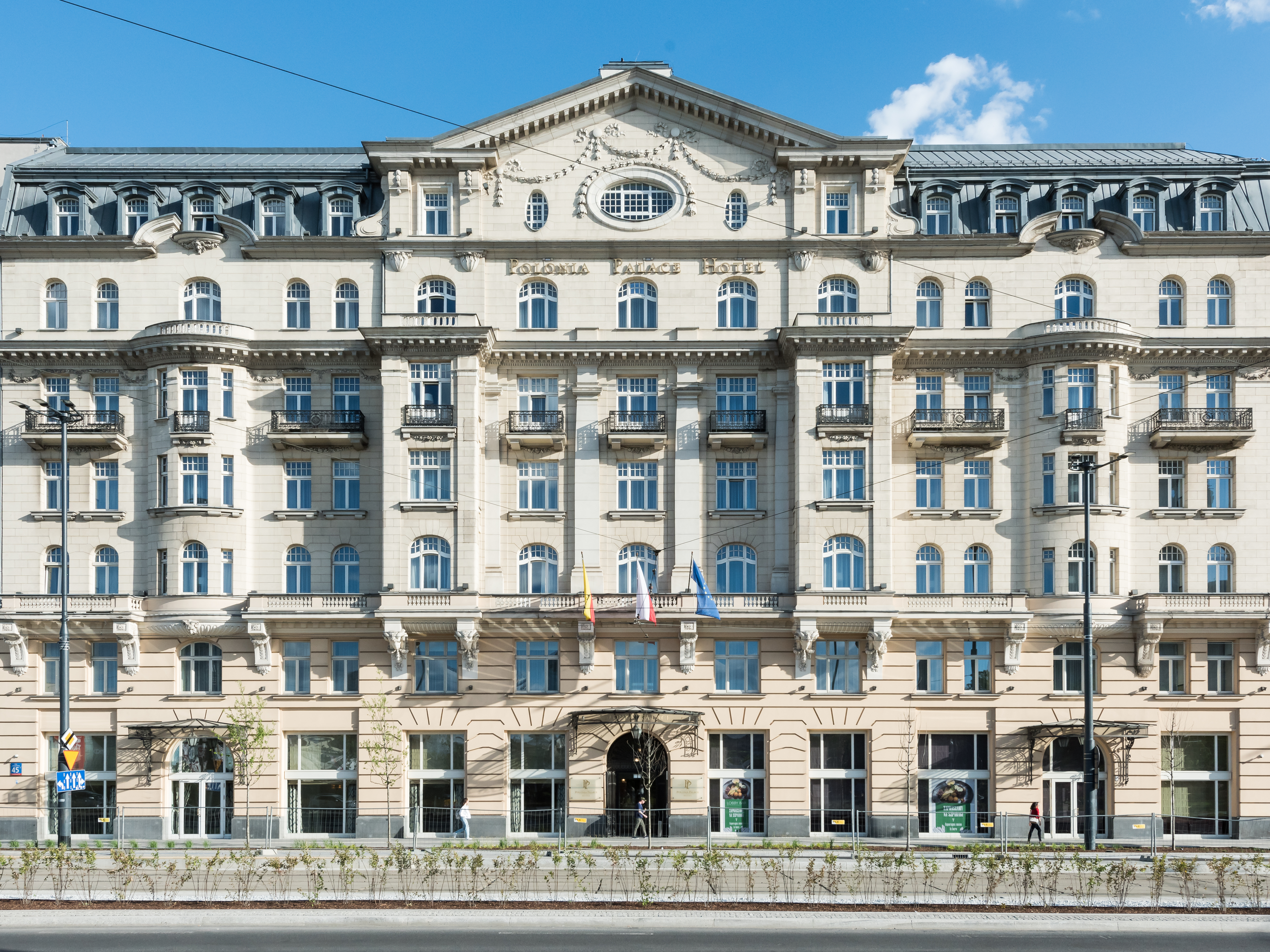
Hotel Polonia Palace

The estimated number of tourist arrivals to Warsaw in 2022 was over 9 million. Most tourists came from the United Kingdom (347,000), Germany (321,000), the United States (206,000) and France (145,000). Additionally, Warsaw was visited by 5.8 million one-day tourists, giving a total of over 14.8 million tourists in 2022. The above data does not include Ukrainian citizens who came to Warsaw during the Russo-Ukrainian war (2022–present). The accommodation base consists of 1,010 hotels offering over 56,000 beds. The estimated contribution of the tourism economy to Warsaw's GDP is 12.9 billion PLN, and the tourism industry employs 87,703 people.

144,220 people used Warsaw Tourist Lines in 2022 - almost 14,000 more than the previous year. In the summer, Warsaw residents and tourists could use ferries across the Vistula, a ship to Serock, bus and tram lines operated with historic rolling stock, and a narrow-gauge railway. The most popular attraction among tourists was the Royal Łazienki Museum, which was visited by 5,265,110 tourists.

Warsaw is an important centre for conferences and congresses. The Warsaw Convention Bureau collected information on 9,000 events in 2022, which gathered a total of 1,240,467 participants in Warsaw.

=== Media and film ===
Warsaw is the media centre of Poland, and the location of the main headquarters of TVP and other numerous local and national TV and radio stations, such as Polskie Radio (Polish Radio), TVN, Polsat, TV4, TV Puls, Canal+ Poland, Cyfra+ and MTV Poland. Warsaw also has a sizable movie and television industry. The city houses several movie companies and studios.

Since May 1661 the first Polish newspaper, the Polish Ordinary Mercury, was printed in Warsaw. The city is also the printing capital of Poland with a wide variety of domestic and foreign periodicals expressing diverse views, and domestic newspapers are extremely competitive. Rzeczpospolita, Gazeta Wyborcza and Dziennik Polska-Europa-Świat, Poland's large nationwide daily newspapers, have their headquarters in Warsaw.

Since World War II, Warsaw has been the most important centre of film production in Poland. Among the movie companies are TOR, Czołówka, Zebra and Kadr which is behind several international movie productions. The city itself has featured in numerous movies, both Polish and foreign, for example: Kanał and Korczak by Andrzej Wajda and The Decalogue by Krzysztof Kieślowski, also including Oscar winner The Pianist by Roman Polański. It is also home to the National Film Archive, which, since 1955, has been collecting and preserving Polish film culture.

== Education ==
Higher education in Warsaw

Name and year established

- University of Warsaw (1816)
- Warsaw University of Technology (1826)
- Warsaw School of Economics (1906)
- Warsaw University of Life Sciences (1816)
- Cardinal Stefan Wyszyński University (1999)
- Medical University of Warsaw (1809/1950)
- Academy of Fine Arts (1844)
- National Academy of Dramatic Art (1946)
- Academy of National Defence (1947/1990)
- Military University of Technology (1951)
- University of Physical Education in Warsaw (1929)
- Fryderyk Chopin University of Music (1810)
- Kozminski University (1993)
- SWPS University (1996)

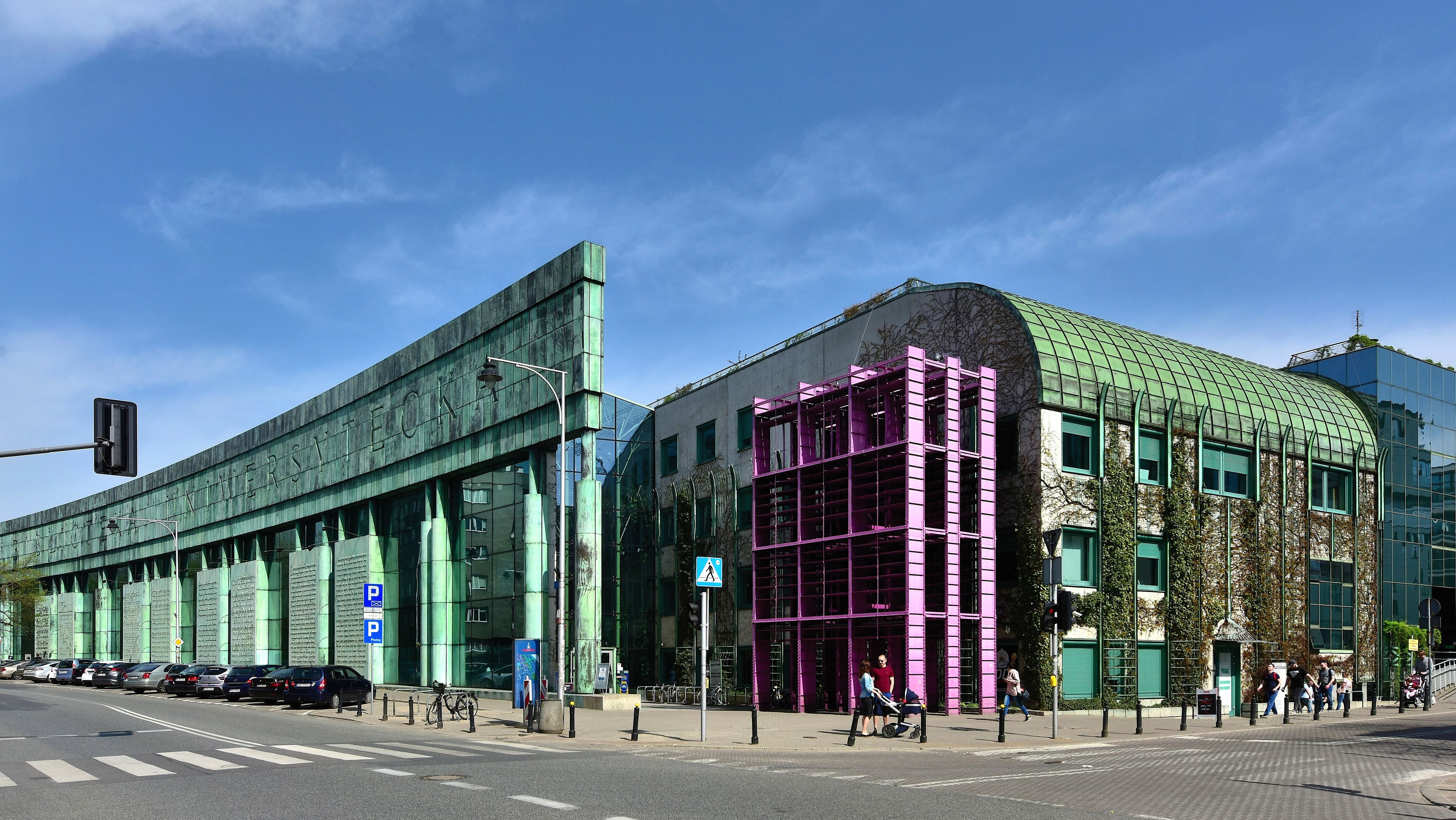
Warsaw University Library

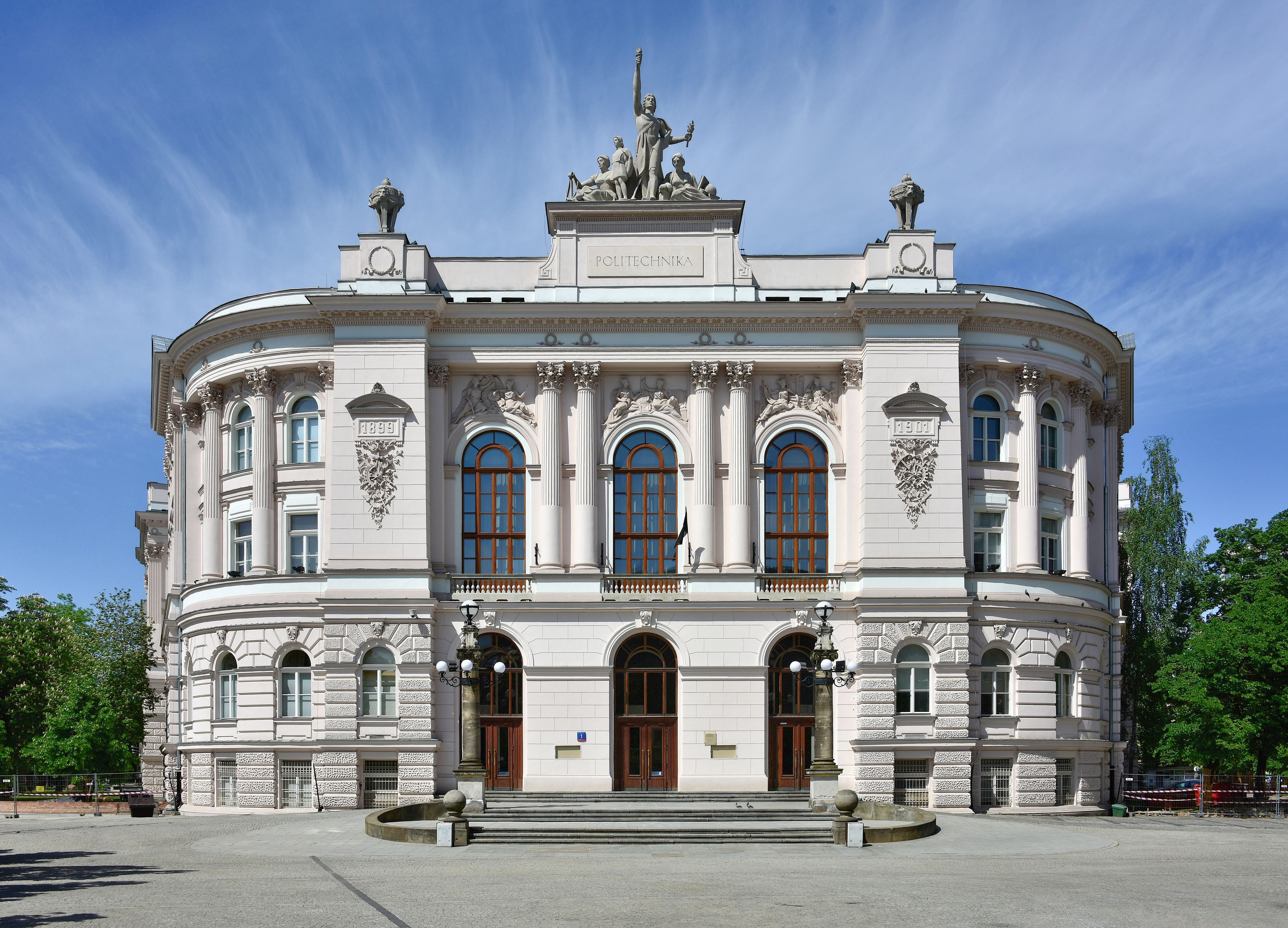
Warsaw University of Technology main building

Warsaw holds some of the finest institutions of higher education in Poland. It is home to four major universities and over 62 smaller schools of higher education. The overall number of students of all grades of education in Warsaw is almost 500,000 (29.2% of the city population; 2002). The number of university students is over 280,000. Most of the reputable universities are public, but in recent years there has also been an upsurge in the number of private universities.

The University of Warsaw was established in 1816, when the partitions of Poland separated Warsaw from the oldest and most influential Polish academic centre, in Kraków. The university is the largest in the country, and often regarded as one of the most prestigious, with international recognition in mathematics and science. Warsaw University of Technology is the second academic school of technology in the country, and one of the largest in East-Central Europe. Other institutions for higher education include the Medical University of Warsaw, the largest medical school in Poland and one of the most prestigious; the National Defence University, the highest military academic institution in Poland; the Fryderyk Chopin University of Music, the oldest and largest music school in Poland and one of the largest in Europe; the Warsaw School of Economics, the oldest and most renowned economic university in the country; the Warsaw University of Life Sciences, the largest agricultural university, founded in 1818; and the SWPS University, the first private secular university in the country.

Warsaw has numerous libraries, many of which contain vast collections of historic documents. The most important library in terms of historic document collections is the National Library of Poland. The library holds 8.2 million volumes in its collection. Formed in 1928, it sees itself as a successor to the Załuski Library, the biggest in Poland and one of the first and biggest libraries in the world.

Another important library, the Warsaw University Library, founded in 1816, features the collection of over two million items. The building was designed by architects Marek Budzyński and Zbigniew Badowski and opened on 15 December 1999. It is surrounded by green. The University Library garden, designed by Irena Bajerska, was opened on 12 June 2002. It is one of the largest roof gardens in Europe with an area of more than 10,000 m^{2} (110,000 sq ft), and plants covering 5,111 m^{2} (55,010 sq ft). As the university garden, it is open to the public every day.

== Transport ==
Warsaw is a considerable transport hub linking Western, Central and Eastern Europe. The city has a good network of buses and a continuously expanding perpendicular metro running north to south and east to west. The tram system is one of the biggest in Europe, with a total length of 133 km (83 mi). As a result of increased foreign investment, economic growth and EU funding, the city has undertaken the construction of new roads, flyovers and bridges. The supervising body is the City Roads Authority (ZDM – Zarząd Dróg Miejskich).

=== Public transport ===
The first section of the Warsaw Metro was opened in 1995 initially with a total of 11 stations. As of 2024, it has 39 stations running a distance of approximately 41 km (25 mi).

Public transport also extends to light rail Warszawska Kolej Dojazdowa line, urban railway Szybka Kolej Miejska, regional rail Masovian Railways, and bicycle sharing systems (Veturilo). The buses, trams, urban railway and Metro are managed by the Public Transport Authority and are collectively known as Warsaw Public Transport.

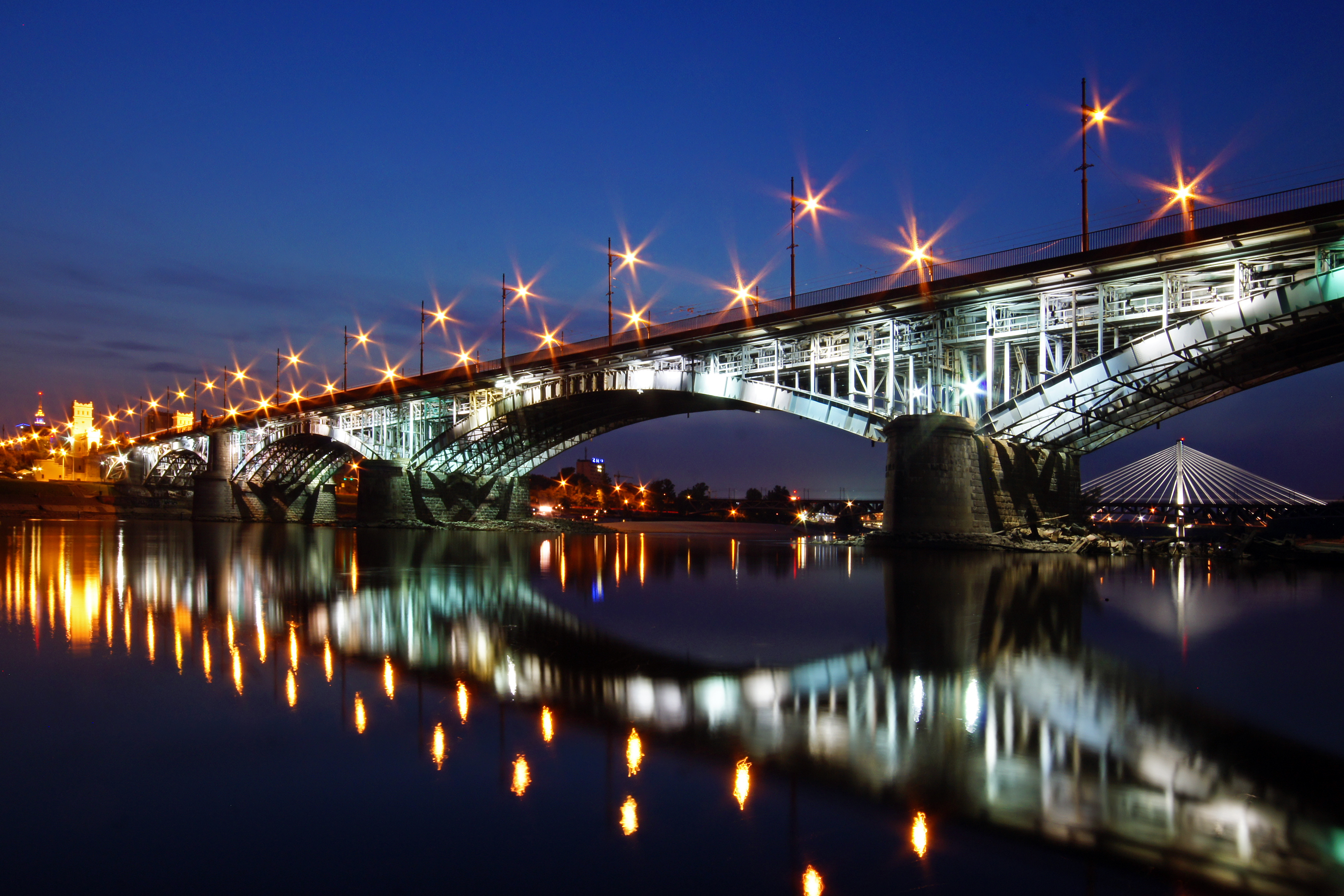
There are 11 bridges over the Vistula within the city. In the photo, Poniatowski Bridge and Świętokrzyski Bridge in the distance

The table presents statistics on public transport in Warsaw.

| System | Stations / Lines / Net length | Annual ridership | Operator / Notes |
|---|---|---|---|
| Metro | 39 / 2 / 41 km (25 mi) | 199,974,995 (2023) | ZTM / Underground rail system |
| Trams | 538 / 24 / 133 km (83 mi) | 248,903,710 (2023) | ZTM / Lines marked with one- or two-digit number |
| Bus | 3227 / 301 / 3,024 km (1,879 mi) | 452,220,927 (2023) | ZTM / Extensive services in all boroughs / 41 Night lines / Lines marked with three-digit number |
| Fast Urban Railway | 198 / 9 / 116 km (72 mi) | 15,161,224 (2023) | ZTM / Overground rapid transit rail system |
| Masovian Railways | 45 stations within the city | 36,018,918 (2023) | KM / Regional carrier / Within the city limits a common ticket with other means of public transport / Number of passengers using stations located in Warsaw |
| Commuter Railway | 28 / 2 / 33 km (21 mi) | 3,516,550 (2023) | WKD / Operates on a separate railway line |

=== Roads ===
Warsaw lacks a complete ring road system and most traffic goes directly through the city centre, leading to the eleventh highest level of congestion in Europe. The Warsaw ring road has been planned to consist of four express roads: S2 (south), S8 (north-west) and S17 (east). S8, S2 and a small 3 km (2 mi) section of S17 are open. Additionally, the S2 and S8 have a concurrency with the S7 and the S2 has a short concurrency with the S8. A second ring road consisting of the A50 motorway (south) and S50 expressway (north) is also planned but it is unknown when construction will start.

The A2 motorway opened in June 2012, stretches west from Warsaw and is a direct motorway connection with Łódź, Poznań and ultimately with Berlin.

=== Aviation ===
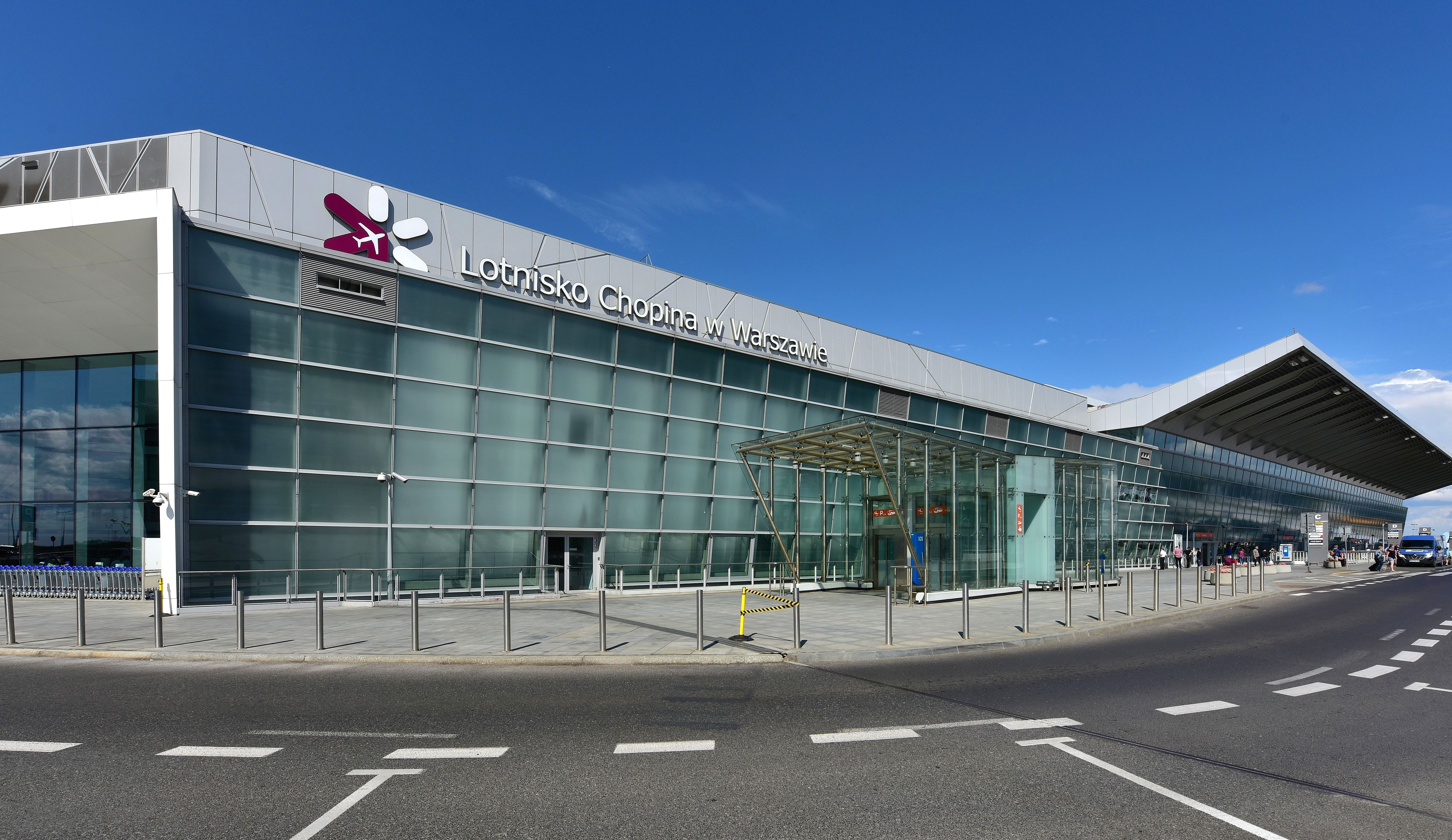
Warsaw Chopin Airport

The city has three international airports: Warsaw Chopin Airport, located just 10 kilometres (6.2 mi) from the city centre, Warsaw-Radom Airport, located 90 kilometres (56 mi) south of Warsaw, which serves mainly low-cost and charter operations and finally Warsaw-Modlin Airport, located 35 kilometres (22 mi) to the north, opened in July 2012. Warsaw Chopin Airport is the busiest airport in Poland with 21.3 million passengers in 2024 handling approximately 40% of the country's total air passenger traffic. The airport is a central hub for LOT Polish Airlines as well as a base for Enter Air and Wizz Air. There are 50 air operations performed at the airport per hour. London, Frankfurt, Paris, and Amsterdam are the busiest international connections, while Kraków, Wrocław, and Gdańsk are the most popular domestic ones. The complex contains 45 passenger gates, 27 of which are equipped with jetways. A rail link has been added to connect the city with the airport in 2012.

=== Rail ===
Long distance and intercity trains are operated by PKP Intercity. There are also some suburban bus lines run by private operators. Bus service covers the entire city, with approximately 256 routes totalling above 3,000 kilometres (1,900 mi), and with some 1,700 vehicles.

The main railway station is Warszawa Centralna serving both domestic traffic to almost every major city in Poland, and international connections. There are also five other major railway stations and a number of smaller suburban stations.

Public transport in Warsaw

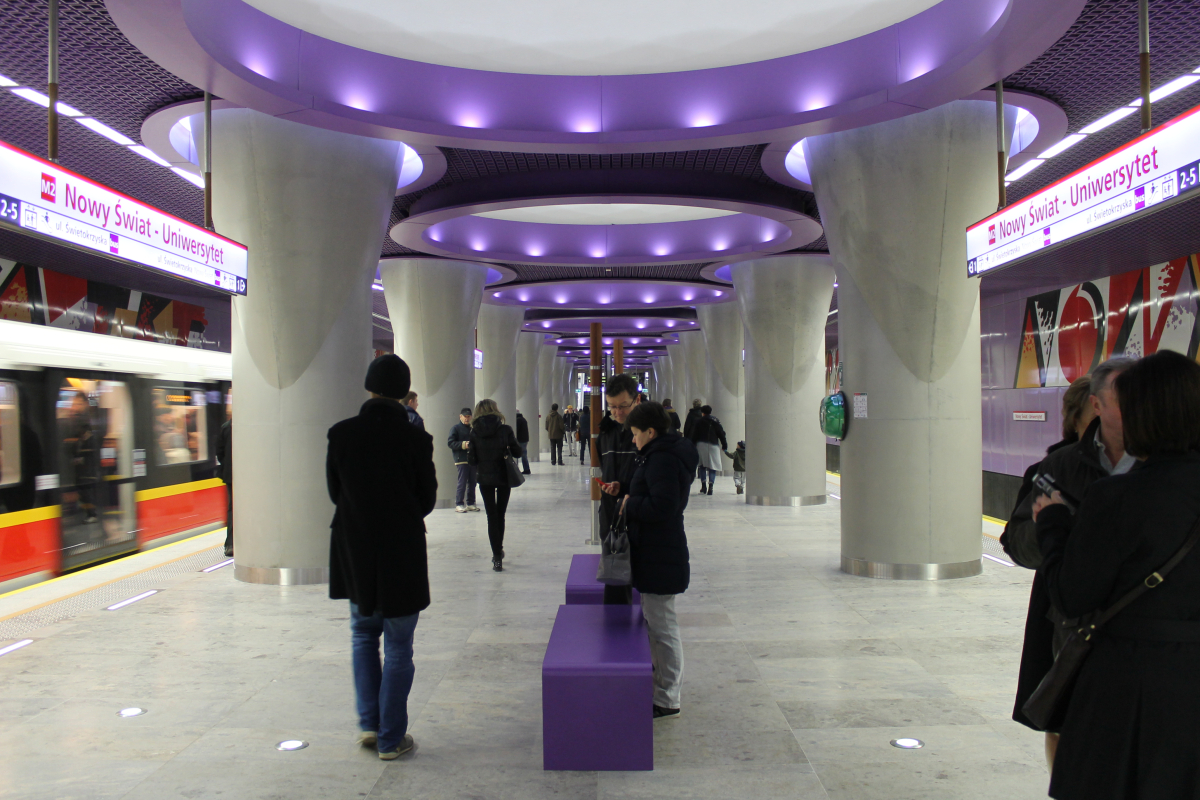
Metro Line 2, Nowy Świat-Uniwersytet station

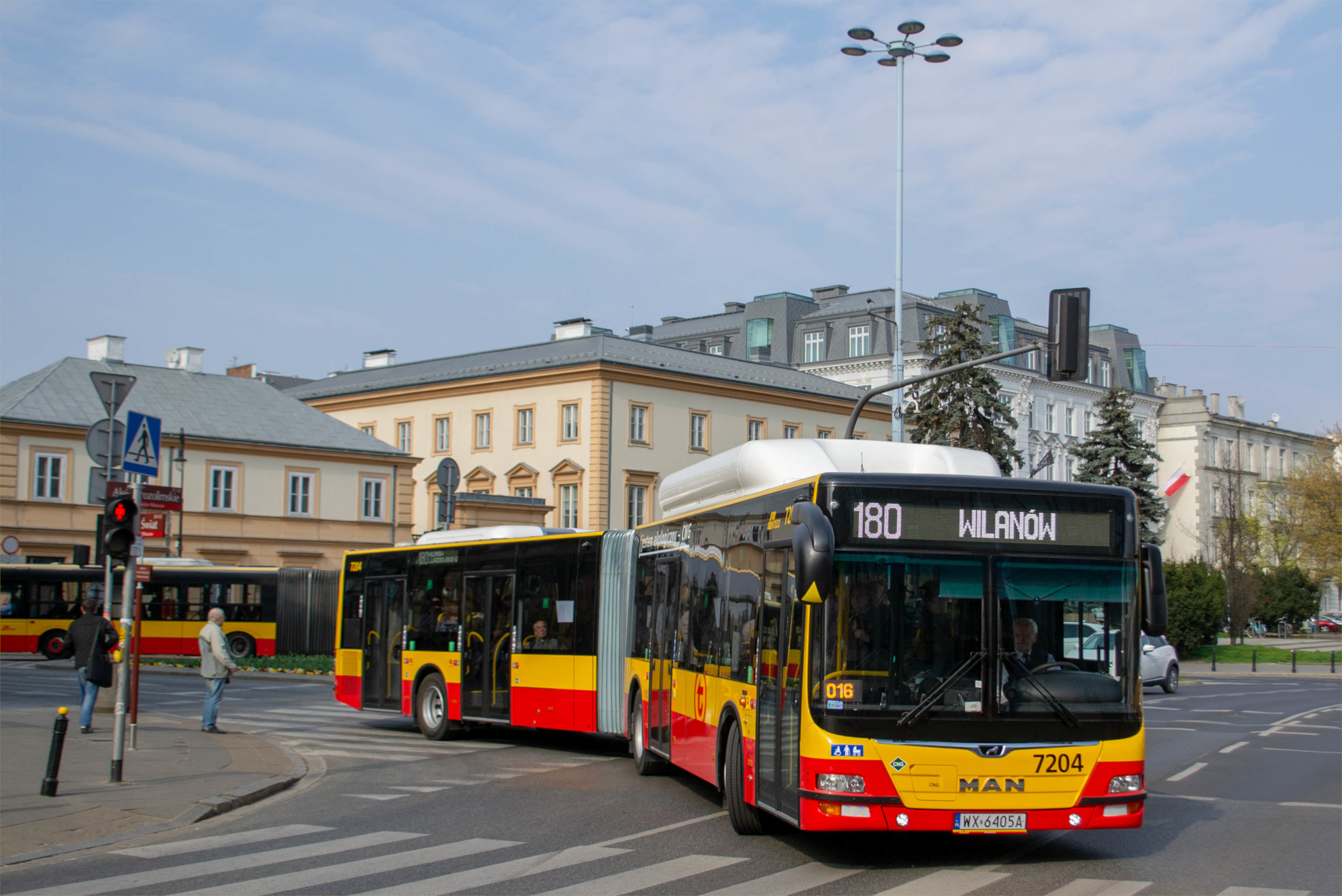
Bus

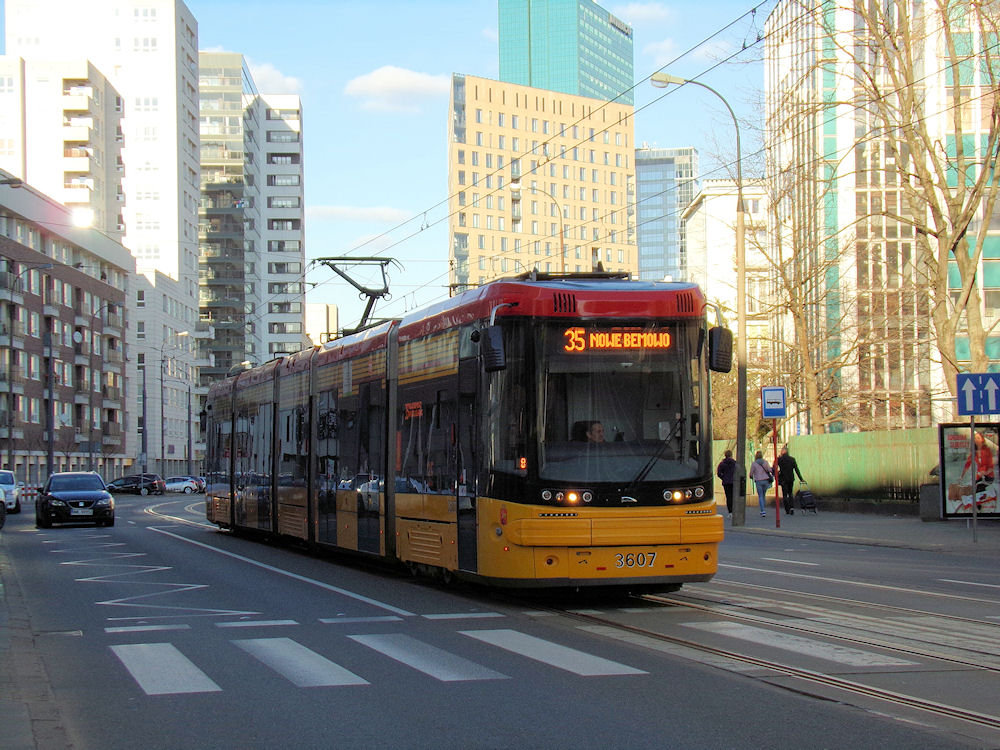
Tram car

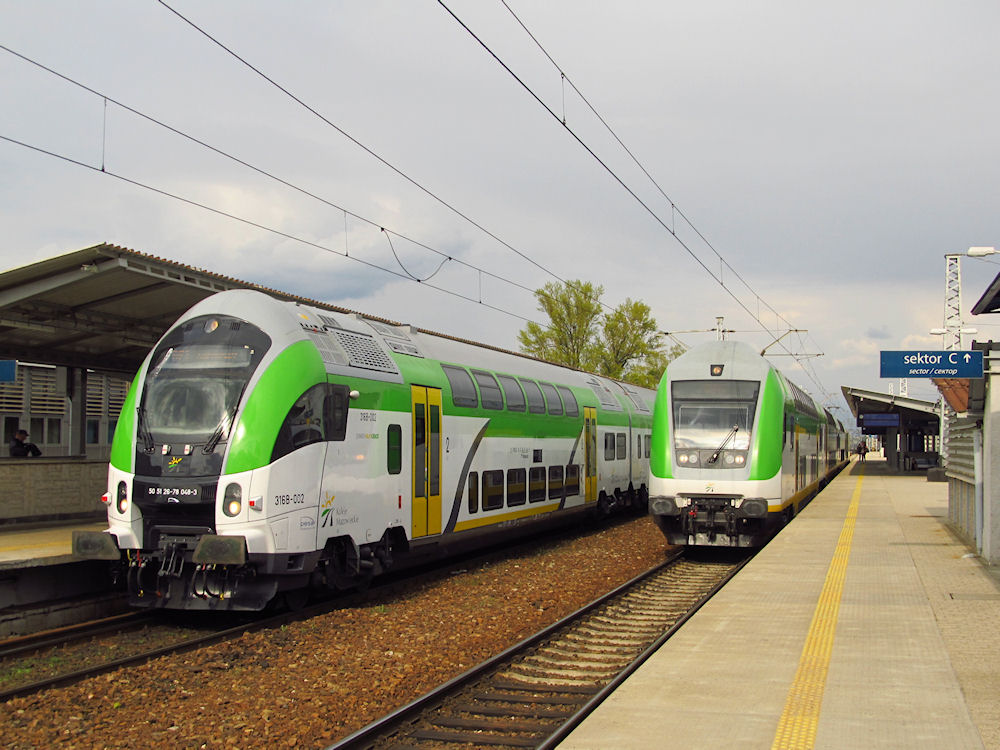
Masovian Railways trains at Warszawa Wschodnia

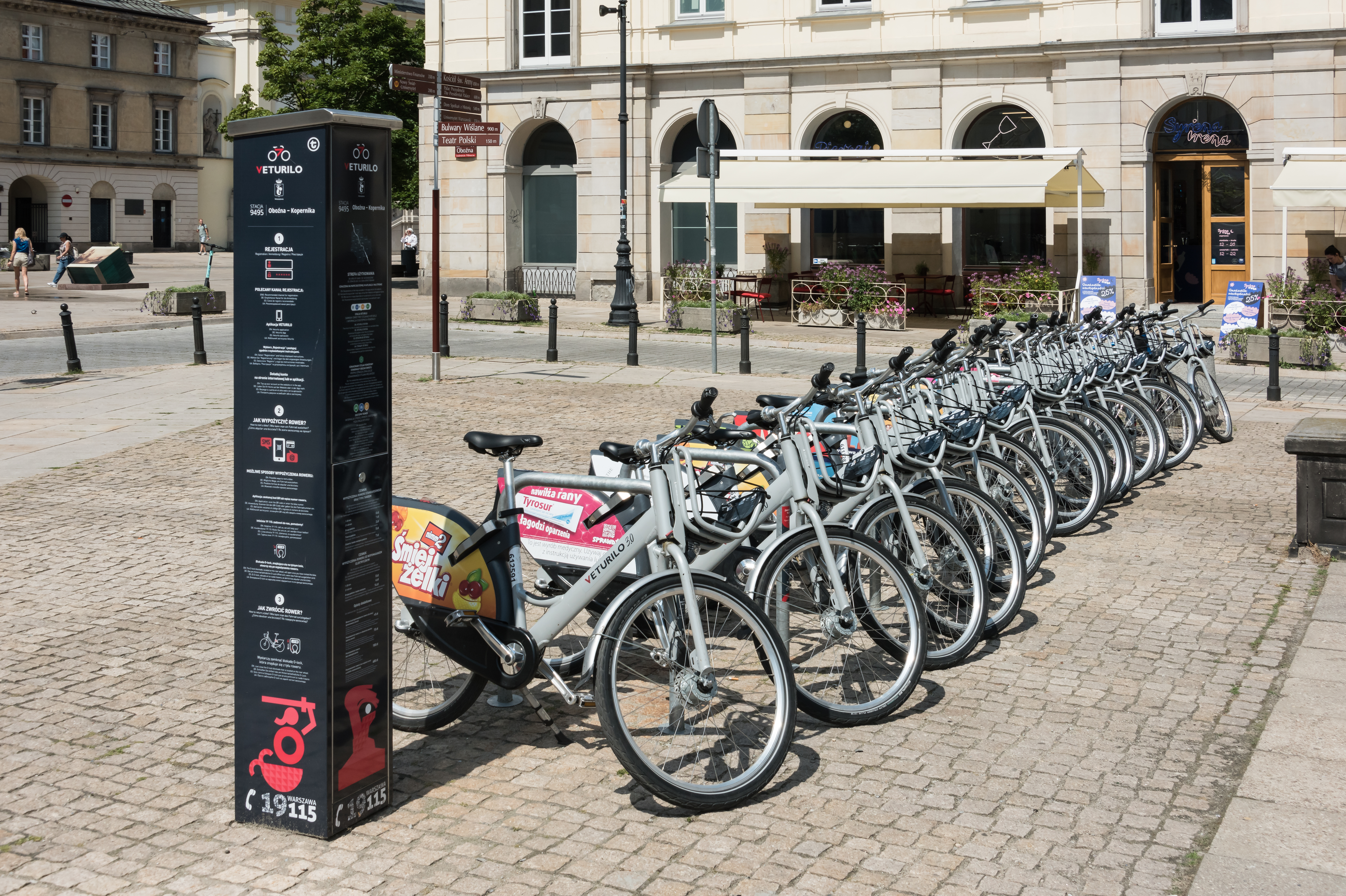
Veturilo bicycle rack at Oboźna Street

== Culture ==
=== Music and theatre ===
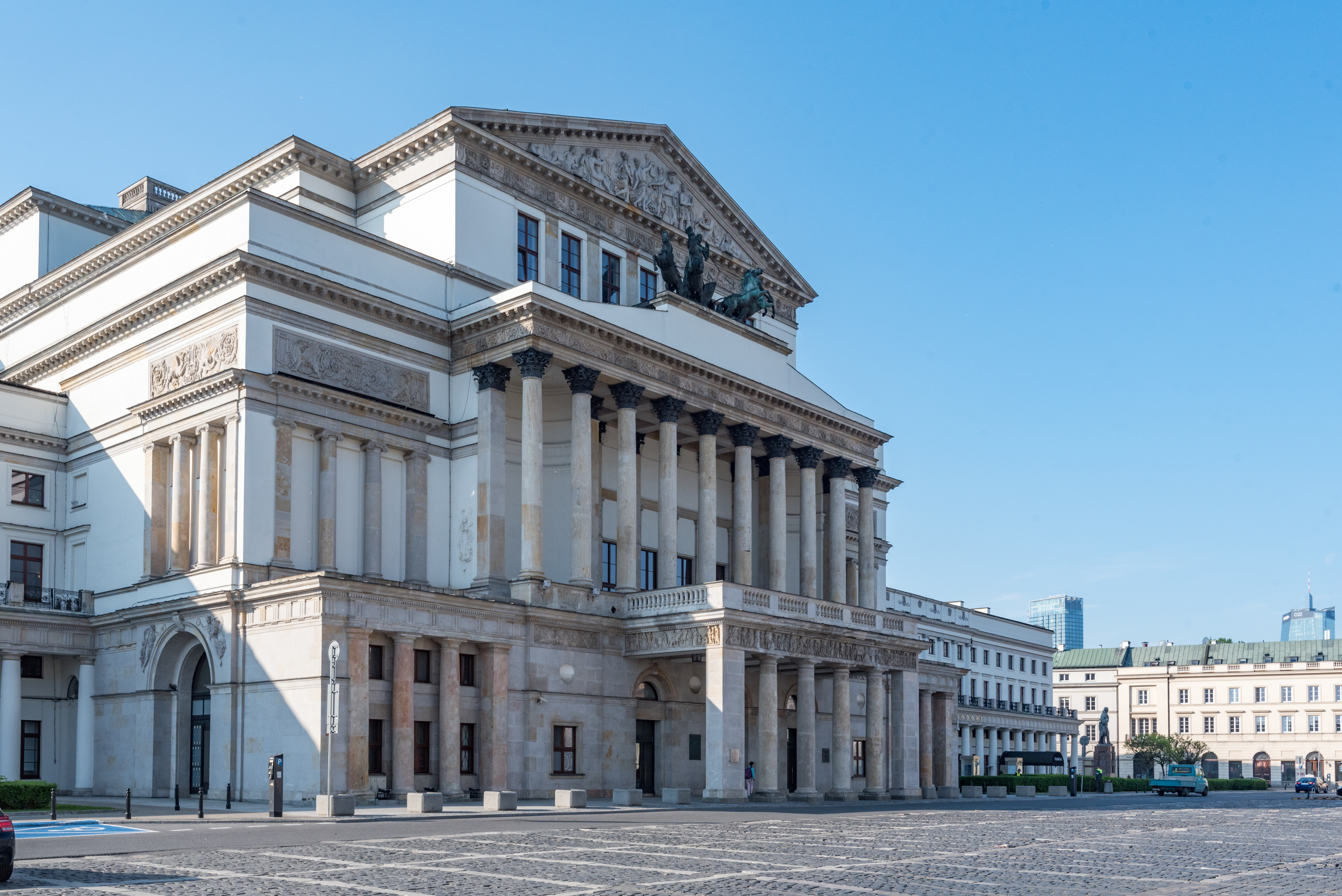
The edifice of the Grand Theatre in Warsaw. It is one of the largest theatres in Europe, featuring one of the biggest stages in the world.

Thanks to numerous musical venues, including the Teatr Wielki, the Polish National Opera, the Chamber Opera, the National Philharmonic Hall and the National Theatre, as well as the Roma and Buffo music theatres and the Congress Hall in the Palace of Culture and Science, Warsaw hosts many events and festivals. Among the events worth particular attention are: the International Frédéric Chopin Piano Competition, the International Contemporary Music Festival Warsaw Autumn, the Jazz Jamboree, Warsaw Summer Jazz Days, the International Stanisław Moniuszko Vocal Competition, the Mozart Festival, and the Festival of Old Music.

Warsaw is also considered a European hub of underground electronic music, with a large house and techno music scene.

Warsaw is home to over 30 major theatres spread throughout the city, including the National Theatre (founded in 1765) and the Grand Theatre (established 1778).

Warsaw also attracts many young and off-stream directors and performers who add to the city's theatrical culture. Their productions may be viewed mostly in smaller theatres and Houses of Culture (Domy Kultury), mostly outside Śródmieście (Central Warsaw). Warsaw hosts the International Theatrical Meetings.

From 1833 to the outbreak of World War II, Plac Teatralny (Theatre Square) was the country's cultural hub and home to the various theatres. Plac Teatralny and its environs was the venue for numerous parades, celebrations of state holidays, carnival balls and concerts.

The main building housed the Great Theatre from 1833 to 1834, the Rozmaitości Theatre from 1836 to 1924 and then the National Theatre, the Reduta Theatre from 1919 to 1924, and from 1928 to 1939 – the Nowy Theatre, which staged productions of contemporary poetical drama, including those directed by Leon Schiller.

Nearby, in Ogród Saski (the Saxon Garden), the Summer Theatre was in operation from 1870 to 1939, and in the inter-war period, the theatre complex also included Momus, Warsaw's first literary cabaret, and Leon Schiller's musical theatre Melodram. The Wojciech Bogusławski Theatre (1922–26) was the best example of "Polish monumental theatre". From the mid-1930s, the Great Theatre building housed the Upati Institute of Dramatic Arts – the first state-run academy of dramatic art, with an acting department and a stage directing department.

=== Museums and art galleries ===
Museums in Warsaw
- National Museum
- Zachęta National Gallery of Art
- Royal Castle
- Warsaw Uprising Museum
- Copernicus Science Centre
- Museum of Evolution of Polish Academy of Sciences
- Museum of the Earth of the Polish Academy of Sciences
- Centre for Contemporary Art
- Museum of Modern Art
- Museum of the Polish Army
- Fryderyk Chopin Museum
- Museum of Warsaw
- Museum of Polish History
- Museum of Independence
- Museum of the History of the Polish Jews
- Museum of Sport and Tourism
- Legia Warsaw Museum
- Museum of Communism
- Museum of Caricature
- Maria Skłodowska-Curie Museum

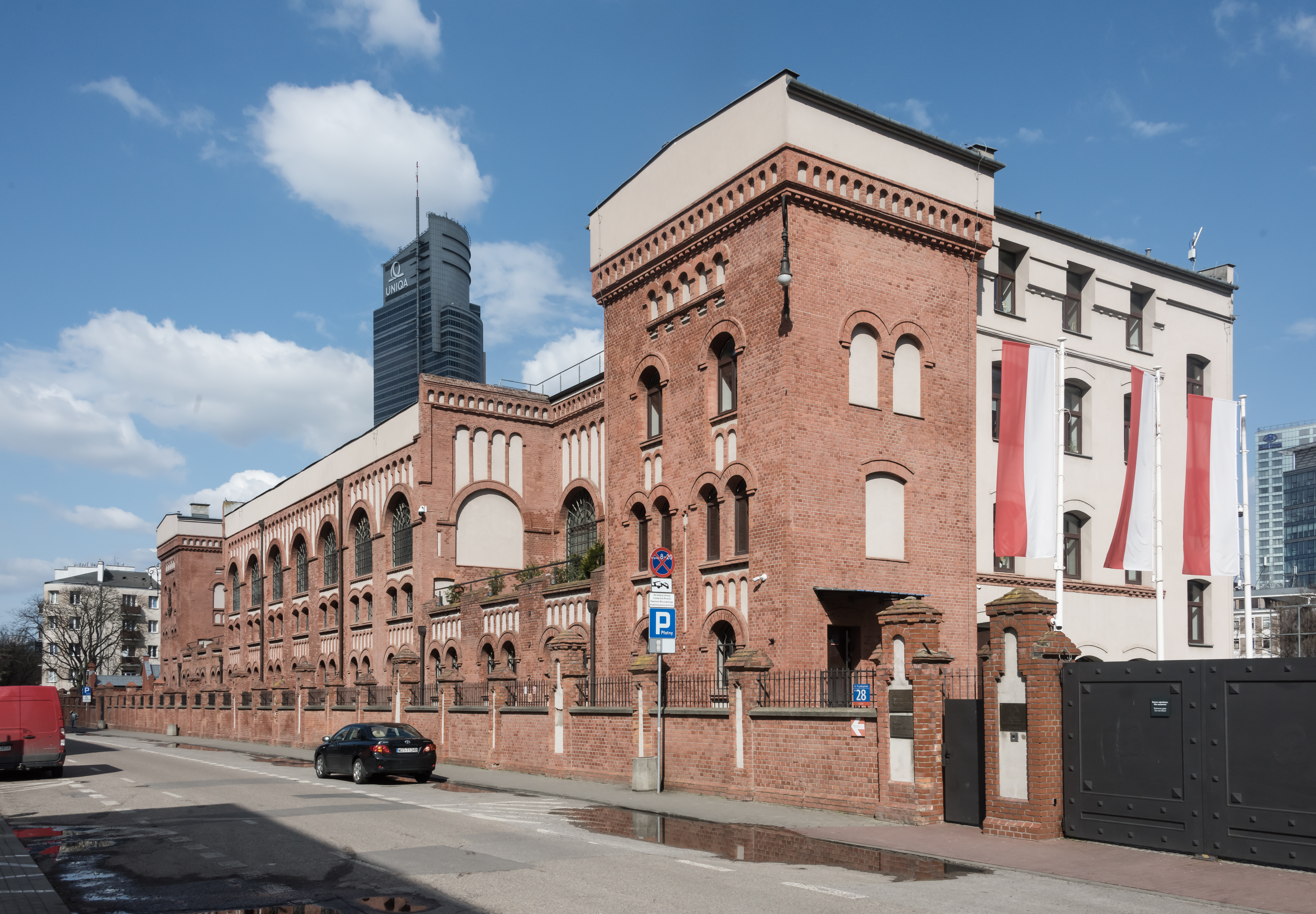
Warsaw Rising Museum

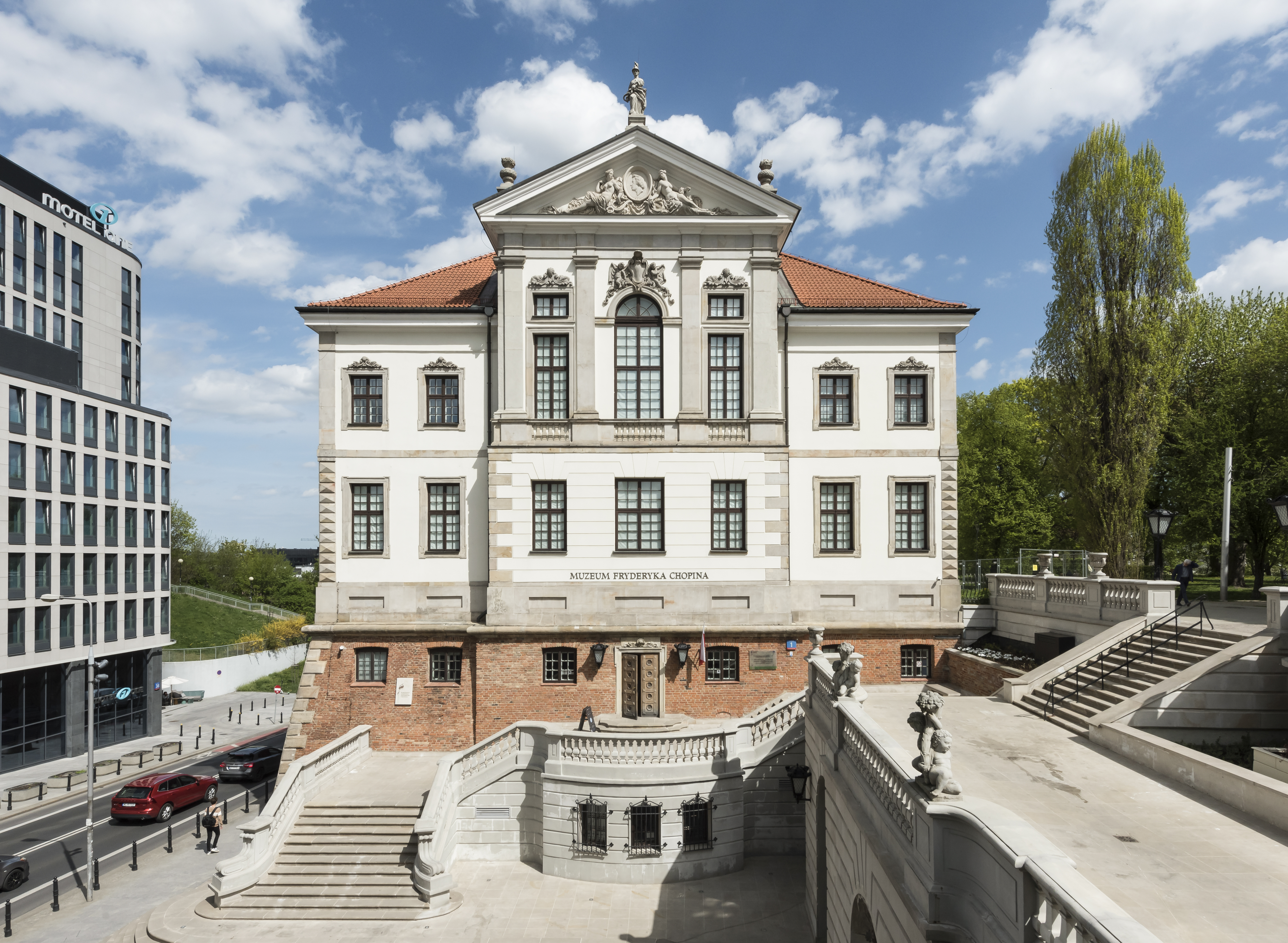
The 17th-century Ostrogski Castle houses the Chopin Museum

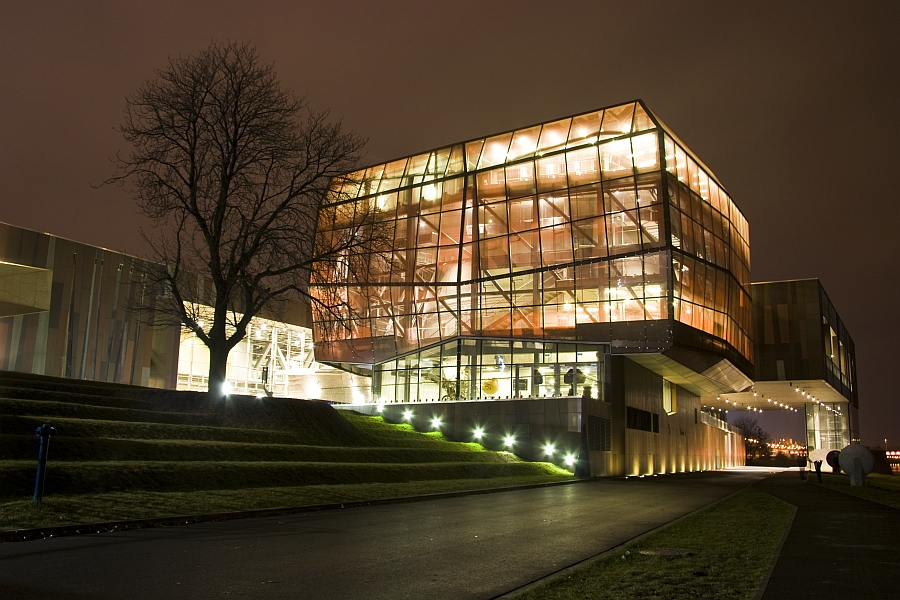
Copernicus Science Centre, planetarium

There are over 60 museums and galleries in Warsaw which are accessible to the public. Among the positions are the world's first Museum of Posters boasting one of the largest collections of art posters in the world, and the Museum of the History of Polish Jews. Among the most prestigious ones are the National Museum with a collection of works whose origin ranges in time from antiquity until the present epoch as well as one of the best collections of paintings in the country including some paintings from Adolf Hitler's private collection, and the Museum of the Polish Army whose set portrays the history of arms.

The collections of Łazienki and Wilanów palaces focus on the paintings of the "old masters", as do those of the Royal Castle which displays the Lanckoroński Collection including two paintings by Rembrandt. The Palace in Natolin, a former rural residence of Duke Czartoryski, is another venue with its interiors and park accessible to tourists.

The famous Copernicus Science Centre is an interactive science museum containing over 450 exhibits, enabling visitors to carry out experiments and discover the laws of science for themselves. Warsaw does not have a natural history museum. Yet, it hosts small museums of Evolution and the Earth, which play a similar role.

Holding Poland's largest private collection of art, the Carroll Porczyński Collection Museum displays works from such varied artists as Paris Bordone, Cornelis van Haarlem, José de Ribera, William-Adolphe Bouguereau, Pierre-Auguste Renoir, and Vincent van Gogh along with some copies of masterpieces of European painting.

A fine tribute to the fall of Warsaw and history of Poland can be found in the Warsaw Uprising Museum and in the Katyń Museum which preserves the memory of that crime. The Warsaw Uprising Museum also operates a rare preserved and operating historic stereoscopic theatre, the Warsaw Fotoplastikon. The Museum of Independence preserves patriotic and political objects connected with Poland's struggles for independence. Dating back to 1936 the Warsaw Historical Museum contains 60 rooms which host a permanent exhibition of the history of Warsaw from its origins until today.

The 17th century Royal Ujazdów Castle houses the Centre for Contemporary Art, with some permanent and temporary exhibitions, concerts, shows and creative workshops. The Centre realizes about 500 projects a year. The Zachęta National Gallery of Art, the oldest exhibition site in Warsaw, with a tradition stretching back to the mid-19th century organises exhibitions of modern art by Polish and International Artists and promotes art in many other ways. Since 2011, Warsaw Gallery Weekend is held on the last weekend of September.

28 September 2023 the opening of the new building of the Museum of Polish History located at the Warsaw Citadel took place.

The city also possesses some oddities such as the Neon Museum, the Museum of Caricature, the Museum of John Paul II and Primate Wyszyński, the Legia Warsaw Museum, and a Motorisation Museum in Otrębusy.

On 25 October 2024, the official opening of the Museum of Modern Art in Warsaw (MSN) took place. The museum opened at its new address: Marszałkowska 103, next to the developing Central Square (Plac Centralny). Its new building is described as the first post-war building in Warsaw created specifically with contemporary art in mind.

=== Cuisine and food ===
Warsaw's culinary tradition was shaped by its once multicultural population; its cuisine is distinct from that of other cities and towns in Poland. Strong Jewish and French influences were cultivated over the years, in particular herring, consommé, bagels, aspic and French meringue-based pastries or cakes. Traditional Varsovian food is hearty and includes a tripe soup for entrée, a pyza dumpling for main and the iconic wuzetka (voo-zetka) chocolate cream pie for dessert. Crayfish and fish in gelatin were the classical dishes in Warsaw's restaurants throughout the 1920s and the 1930s.

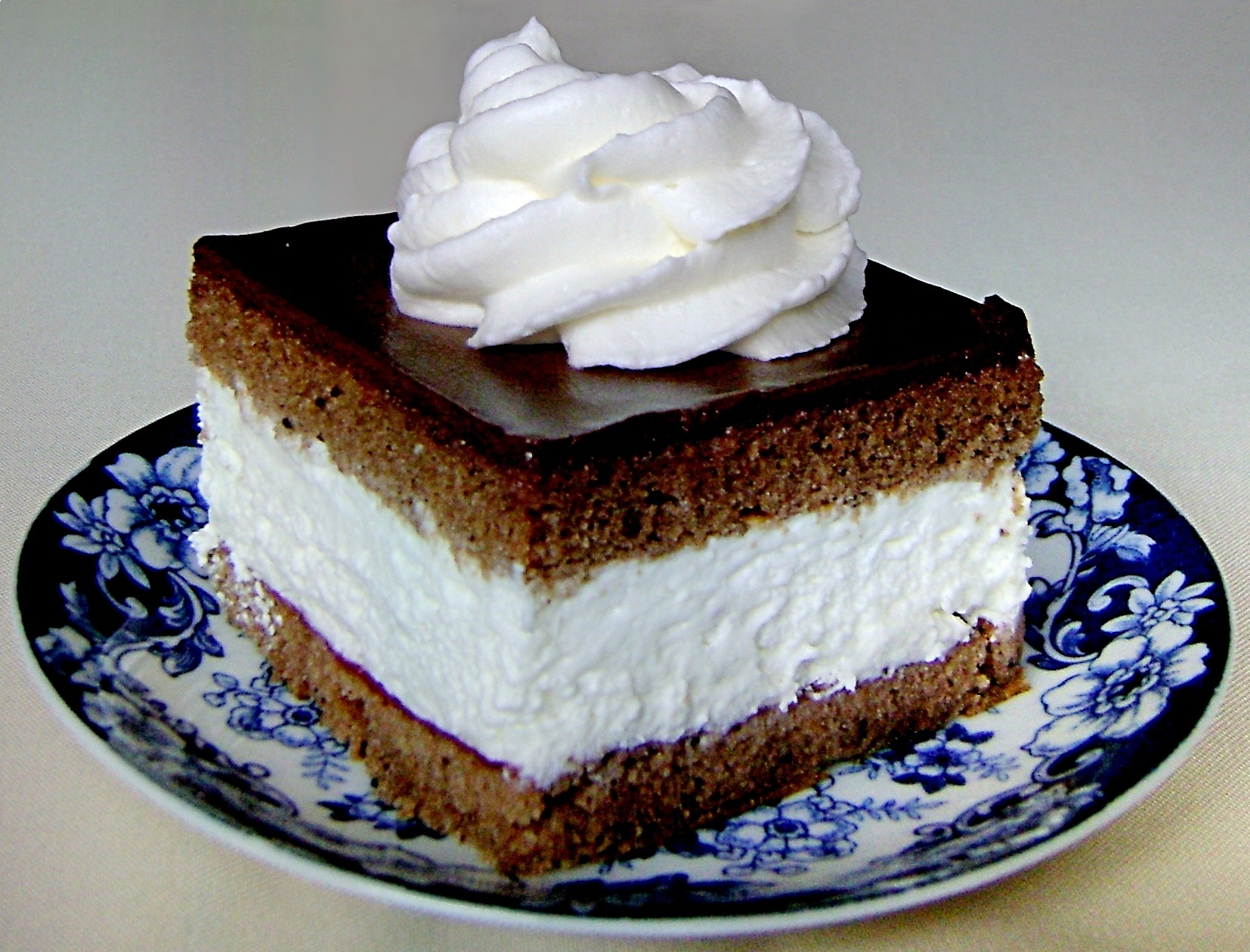
The wuzetka chocolate sponge cake is a Warsaw classic

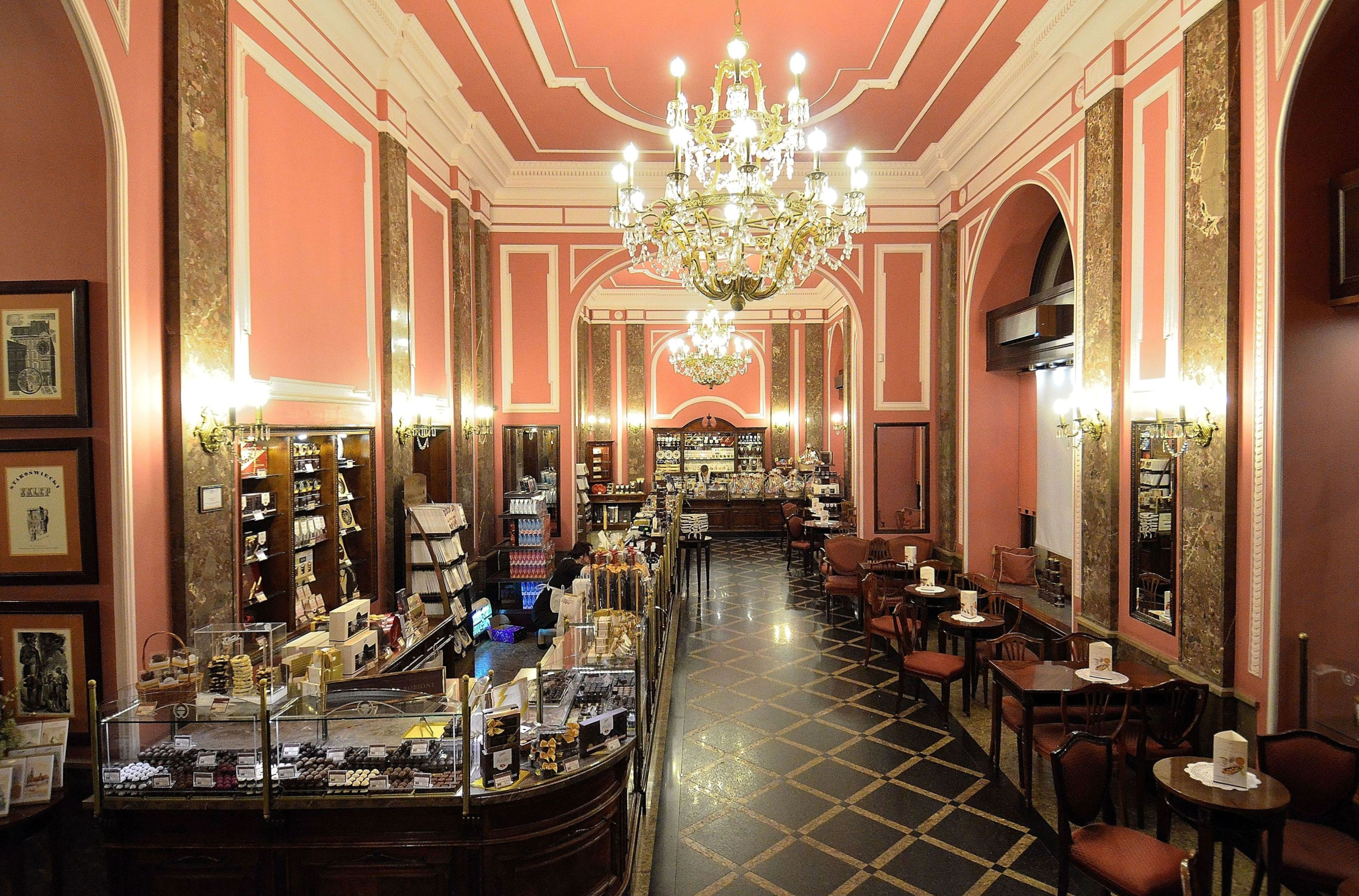
Interior of the Wedel Chocolate Lounge on Szpitalna Street

Much like Paris or Vienna, Warsaw once possessed a prominent café culture which dated back to the early 18th century, and the city's cafeterias were a place for socializing. The historic Wedel Chocolate Lounge on Szpitalna Street remains one of the most renowned spots for social gatherings. Cafeterias, confectioneries and patisseries such as Caffè Nero, Costa Coffee and Starbucks are predominantly found along the Royal Route on New World Street. Thousands of Warsaw's residents also flock annually to the pastry workshops (pączkarnia) to buy pączki doughnuts on Fat Thursday.

Restaurants offering authentic Polish cuisine are concentrated around the Old Town district. Various spit cakes of Czech or Hungarian origin (kürtőskalács and trdelník) are also sold primarily in the Old Town. Hala Koszyki is a popular meeting place in Warsaw noted for its food hall.

In the 20th century, Warsaw was famed for its state-owned milk bars (bar mleczny) which offered cheap fast food in the form of home dinners. Examples of dishes popularized by these canteens include tomato soup, schnitzels, frikadeller, mizeria salad and many others. Contemporary fast food giants like McDonald's, KFC, Subway and Burger King are the successors to milk bars, though some reemerged in recent years due to widespread nostalgia.

Gourmet and haute cuisine establishments are situated in the vicinity of the downtown area or in the Frascati neighbourhood. Thirteen Varsovian restaurants were appreciated by the Michelin Guide, with two receiving a Michelin star in 2019.

In 2021, National Geographic named Warsaw one of the top cities for vegans in Europe. Śródmieście Południowe (Southern Downtown) and its "hipster food culture" was singled out as the epicentre.

=== Events ===
Several commemorative events take place every year, notably the Orange Warsaw Festival featuring music concerts. One of the more popular events is the procession of the Three Wise Men (in Polish known as the Three Kings) on Epiphany, shortly after the New Year. Paper crowns are usually worn by spectators throughout the day. The event, which runs along the Royal Route, is attended by Warsaw's highest officials and by the Polish president who resides nearby.

Gatherings of thousands of people on the banks of the Vistula on Midsummer's Night for a festival called Wianki (Polish for Wreaths) have also become a tradition and a yearly event in the programme of cultural events in Warsaw. The festival traces its roots to a peaceful pagan ritual where maidens would float their wreaths of herbs on the water to predict when they would be married, and to whom. By the 19th century this tradition had become a festive event, and it continues today. The city council organize concerts and other events. Each Midsummer's Eve, apart from the official floating of wreaths, jumping over fires, and looking for the fern flower, there are musical performances, dignitaries' speeches, fairs and fireworks by the river bank.

Warsaw Multimedia Fountain Park is located in an enchanting place, near the Old Town and the Vistula. The 'Water – Light – Sound' multimedia shows take place each Friday and Saturday from May until September at 9.30 pm (May and – 9 October pm). On other weekdays, the shows do not include lasers and sound.

The Warsaw Film festival is an annual festival that takes place every October. Films are usually screened in their original language with Polish subtitles and participating cinemas include Kinoteka (Palace of Science and Culture), Multikino at Golden Terraces and Kultura. Over 100 films are shown throughout the festival, and awards are given to the best and most popular films.

=== Warsaw Mermaid ===
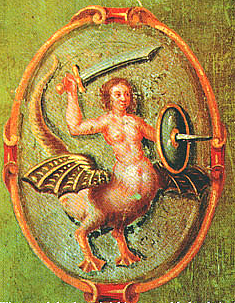
The 1659 coat of arms of Old Warsaw on the cover of one of Warsaw's accounting books

The mermaid (syrenka) is Warsaw's symbol and can be found on statues throughout the city and on the city's coat of arms. This imagery has been in use since at least the mid-14th century. The oldest existing armed seal of Warsaw is from the year 1390, consisting of a round seal bordered with the Latin inscription Sigilium Civitatis Varsoviensis (Seal of the city of Warsaw). City records as far back as 1609 document the use of a crude form of a sea monster with a female upper body and holding a sword in its claws. In 1653 the poet Zygmunt Laukowski asks the question:

Warsaw of strong walls; why was the emblem Mermaid with sharp sword, given you by the kings?

— Zygmunt Laukowski

The Mermaid Statue stands in the very centre of Old Town Square, surrounded by a fountain. Due to vandalism, the original statue had been moved to the grounds of the Museum of Warsaw – the statue in the square is a copy. This is not the only mermaid in Warsaw. Another is located on the bank of the Vistula River near Świętokrzyski Bridge and another on Karowa Street.

The origin of the legendary figure is not fully known. The best-known legend, by Artur Oppman, is that long ago two of Triton's daughters set out on a journey through the depths of the oceans and seas. One of them decided to stay on the coast of Denmark and can be seen sitting at the entrance to the port of Copenhagen. The second mermaid reached the mouth of the Vistula River and plunged into its waters. She stopped to rest on a sandy beach by the village of Warszowa, where fishermen came to admire her beauty and listen to her beautiful voice. A greedy merchant also heard her songs; he followed the fishermen and captured the mermaid.

Another legend says that a mermaid once swam to Warsaw from the Baltic Sea for the love of the Griffin, the ancient defender of the city, who was killed in a struggle against the Swedish invasions of the 17th century. The mermaid, wishing to avenge his death, took the position of defender of Warsaw, becoming the symbol of the city.

Every member of the Queen's Royal Hussars of the UK's light cavalry wears the Maid of Warsaw, the crest of the City of Warsaw, on the left sleeve of his No. 2 (Service) Dress. Members of 651 Squadron Army Air Corps of the United Kingdom also wear the Maid of Warsaw on the left sleeve of their No. 2 (Service) Dress.

== Sports ==
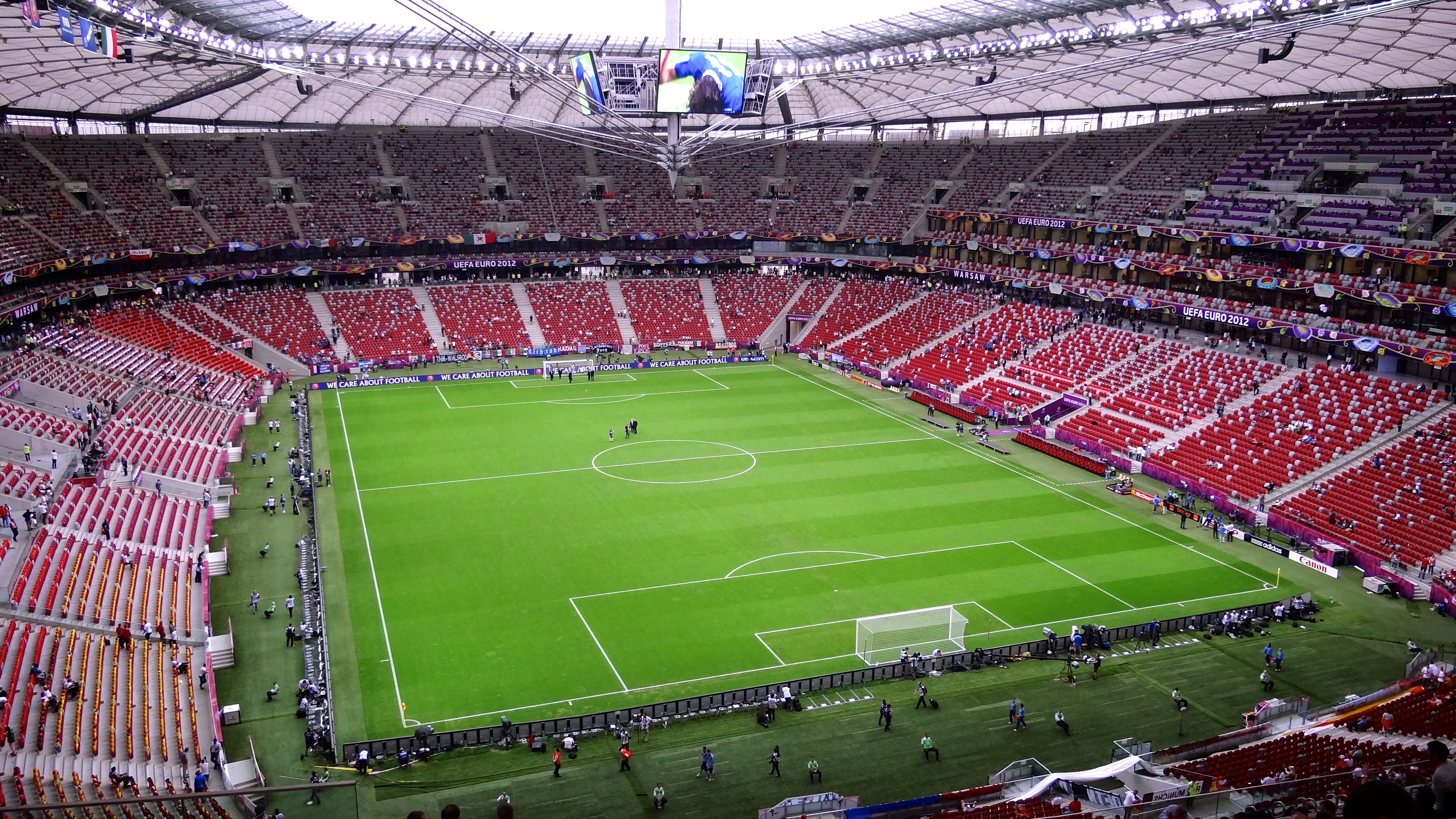
The Interior of the National Stadium before the UEFA Euro 2012 semi-final match between Germany and Italy on 28 June 2012

On 9 April 2008, the Mayor of Warsaw, Hanna Gronkiewicz-Waltz, obtained from the mayor of Stuttgart Wolfgang Schuster a challenge award – a commemorative plaque awarded to Warsaw as the European capital of Sport in 2008.

The Kazimierz Górski National Stadium, a 58,580-seat-capacity football (soccer) stadium, replaced Warsaw's recently demolished 10th-Anniversary Stadium. The National Stadium hosted the opening match, two group matches, a quarter-final, and a semi-final of UEFA Euro 2012.

There are many sports centres in the city as well. Most of these facilities are swimming pools and sports halls, many of them built by the municipality in the past several years. The main indoor venue is Hala Torwar, used for a variety of indoor sports (it was a venue for the 2009 EuroBasket but it is also used as an indoor skating rink). There is also an open-air skating rink (Stegny) and a horse racetrack (Służewiec).

The best of the city's swimming centres is at Wodny Park Warszawianka, 4 km (2 mi) south of the centre at Merliniego Street, where there's an Olympic-sized pool as well as water slides and children's areas.

Among the Varsovian football teams, the most recognisable is Legia Warsaw – the army club with a nationwide following play at the Polish Army Stadium, just southeast of the centre at Łazienkowska Street. Established in 1916, they have won the country's championship fifteen times (most recently in 2021) and won the Polish Cup nineteen times. In the 1995–96 UEFA Champions League season, they reached the quarter-finals, where they lost to Greek club Panathinaikos.

Their local rivals, Polonia Warsaw, have significantly fewer supporters, yet they managed to win the country's championship two times (in 1946 and 2000) and won the cup twice as well. Polonia's home venue is located at Konwiktorska Street, a ten-minute walk north from the Old Town. Polonia was relegated from the country's top flight in 2013 because of their disastrous financial situation. They are now playing in the first league (2nd tier in Poland).

Legia Warsaw's basketball team was one of the country's best teams in 50s and 60s. They are now participating in PLK, the highest-tier level of the Polish basketball.

== International relations ==
=== Twin towns and sister cities ===
Warsaw is twinned with:

- Astana, Kazakhstan (2002)
- Berlin, Germany (1991)
- Chicago, United States (1960)
- Düsseldorf, Germany (1989)
- Hanoi, Vietnam (2000)
- Kyiv, Ukraine (1994)
- Riga, Latvia (2002)
- Rio de Janeiro, Brazil (1997)
- Seoul, South Korea (1996)
- Taipei, Taiwan (1995)
- Tel Aviv, Israel (1992)
- Vilnius, Lithuania (1998)

Former twin towns:

- Grozny, Russia (1997–2022)
- Moscow, Russia (1993–2022)

=== Partnership and friendship ===
Warsaw also cooperates with:

- Budapest, Hungary (2005)
- Buenos Aires, Argentina (1992)
- Coventry, United Kingdom (1957)
- The Hague, Netherlands (1991)
- Hamamatsu, Japan (1990)
- Harbin, China (1993)
- Île-de-France, France (1990)
- Istanbul, Turkey (1991)
- Madrid, Spain (1981)
- Manila, Philippines (2006)
- Oslo, Norway (2006)
- Paris, France (1999)
- Saint-Étienne, France (1995)
- Toronto, Canada (1990)
- Vienna, Austria (1991)
- Yerevan, Armenia (2013)
- Zagreb, Croatia (2011)

Former partner cities:

- Saint Petersburg, Russia (1997–2022)

== See also ==
- C40 Cities Climate Leadership Group
- Destruction of Warsaw
- Architecture of Warsaw
- Legia Warsaw
- List of tallest buildings in Warsaw
- List of honorary citizens of Warsaw
- Street names of Warsaw
- Tourism in Poland
- Various battles of Warsaw
- Various treaties of Warsaw
- Warsaw concentration camp
- Warsaw dialect
- Warsaw Fire Guard

== Bibliography ==
- Crowley, David (2003). Warsaw. Reaktion Books. ISBN 1-86189-179-2. Archived from the original on 8 January 2022.
- Olchowik-Adamowska, Liliana; Ławecki, Tomasz (1 April 2006). Travellers Warsaw (First ed.). Peterborough, United Kingdom: Thomas Cook Publishing. ISBN 978-1-84157-492-9. Archived from the original on 19 December 2011.
- Official webpage of Warsaw Archived 16 November 2007 at the Wayback Machine includes 360° panoramas of the UNESCO listed area. Archived 4 May 2012 at the Wayback Machine
- District Police Headquarters – Warsaw II Archived 16 June 2011 at the Wayback Machine (part of Warsaw Metropolitan Police)
- Warsaw Guide. Archived 5 April 2012 at the Wayback Machine Online City Guide for Warsaw in Poland. Retrieved 17 May 2015.
- What to do and see in Warsaw
