= Statue of Wojciech Korfanty =

Monument in Warsaw, Poland

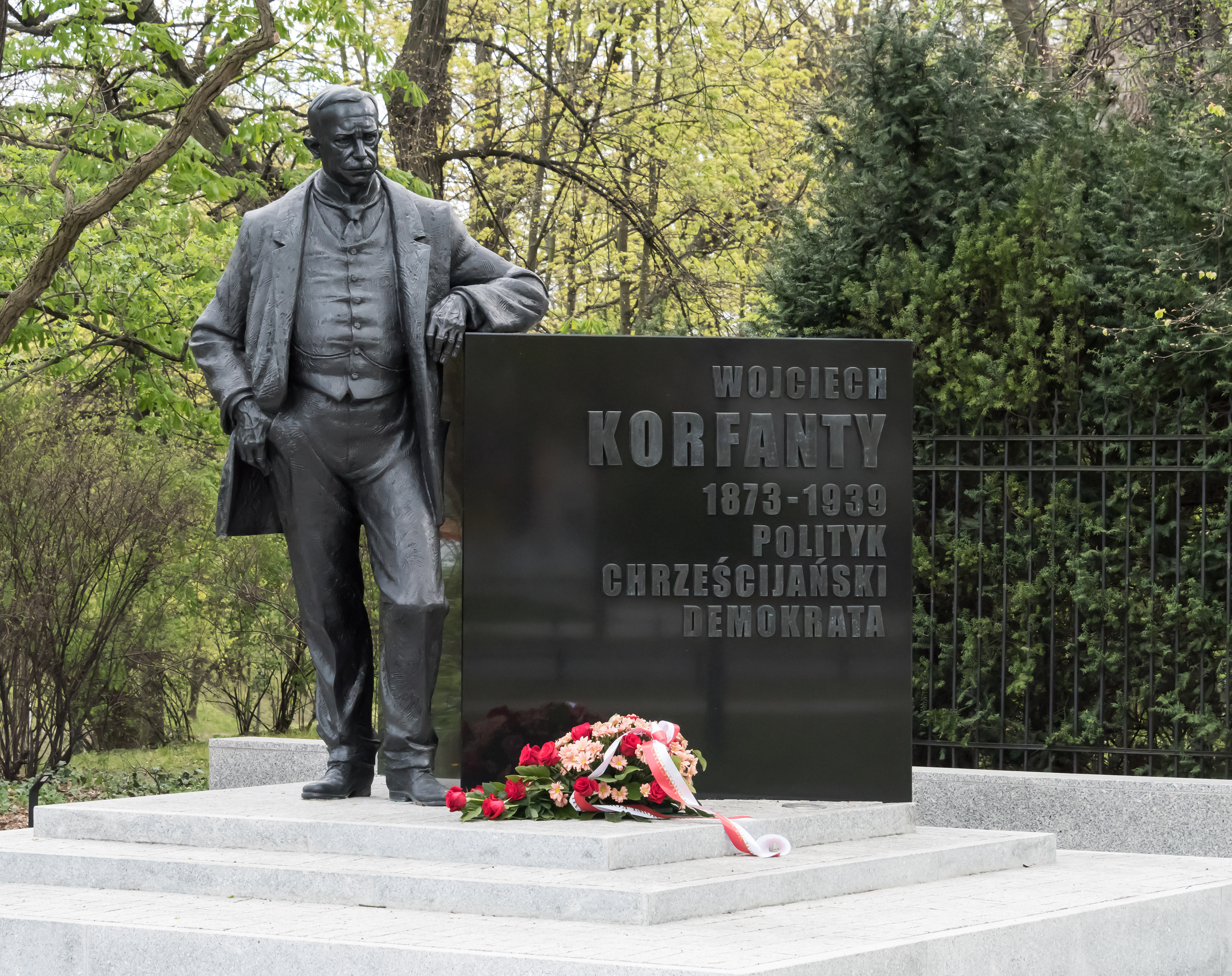
- The monument in 2020.
- Interactive map of Statue of Wojciech Korfanty
- Location: Ujazdów Avenue, Downtown, Warsaw, Poland
- Coordinates: 52°13′6.6″N 21°1′33.7″E
- Designer: Konrad Badyna
- Type: Statue
- Material: Bronze
- Opening date: 25 October 2019
- Dedicated to: Wojciech Korfanty

The statue of Wojciech Korfanty (Polish: Pomnik Wojciecha Korfantego) is a bronze statue in Warsaw, Poland, within the neighbourhood of Ujazdów, in the district of Downtown. It is near the Royal Route, at the intersection of Ujazdów Avenue and Agrykola Street, at the entrance to the University of Warsaw Botanical Garden. The monument is dedicated to Wojciech Korfanty, a 19th- and 20th-century activist, journalist, politician, and parliamentary member, best known as an advocate for incorporation of Upper Silesia into Poland. The statue was designed by Karol Badyna, and unveiled on 25 October 2019.

== History ==
In 2014, the Warsaw City Council approved the proposal of a monument dedicated to Wojciech Korfanty at the Royal Route. In 2018, Warsaw, and eleven cities in the Silesian Voivodeship signed an agreement to finance it together. This included: Bytom, Chorzów, Mikołów, Piekary Śląskie, Radzionków, Ruda Śląska, Siemianowice Śląskie, Świerklaniec, Tarnowskie Góry, Wyry, and Zabrze. A contest for its design was launched on 4 June 2018, with the winning project, submitted by Karol Badyna, being announced on 16 October 2018. The monument was unveiled on 25 October 2019, on the 101st anniversary of a famous speech given by Konfanty in the Reichstag. The ceremony was attended by the President of Poland, Andrzej Duda, Prime Minister Mateusz Morawiecki, and the Mayor of Warsaw, Rafał Trzaskowski.

== Design ==
The monument includes a bronze statue of Wojciech Korfanty, covered with a layer of patina. He is depicted wearing a formal suit, and leaning to the left on a plaque with a Polish inscription which reads: "Wojciech Korfanty; 1873–1939; polityk, chrześcijański demokrata". It translates to "Wojciech Korfanty; 1873–1939; politician, Christian democrat". It was not placed on a plinth, as to illustrate, according to the author, that "Konfanty was never put on a pedestal during his life". The monument is located near the Royal Route, at the intersection of Ujazdów Avenue and Agrykola Street, at the entrance to the University of Warsaw Botanical Garden.
