= Kestner Tenement =

Historic building in Warsaw, Poland

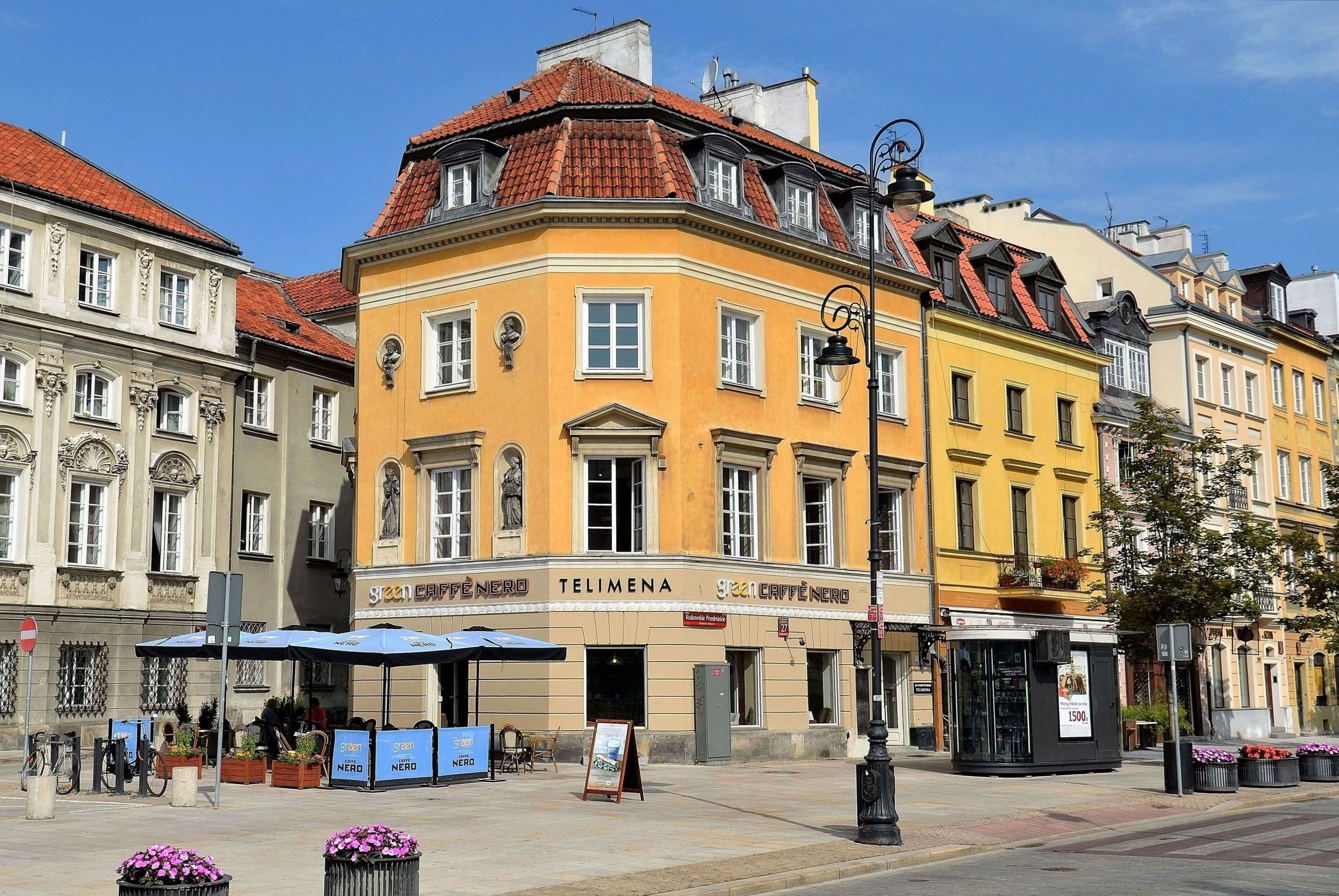
- The building in 2013.
- Interactive map of the Kestner Tenement area

General information
- Type: Tenement house
- Location: Downtown, Warsaw, Poland, 27 Kraków Suburb Street
- Coordinates: 52°14′06.4″N 21°01′06.0″E
- Construction started: 1836
- Completed: 1840

Technical details
- Floor count: 4

Design and construction
- Architect: Józef Grzegorz Lessel

The Kestner Tenement (Polish pronunciation: [ˈkɛs.tnɛr]; Polish: Kamienica Kestnerów) is a tenement house in Warsaw, Poland, located at 27 Kraków Suburb Street, within the North Downtown neighbourhood. It was designed Józef Grzegorz Lessel, and constructed between 1836 and 1840. It was destroyed in the Second World War, and rebuilt in 1949.

== History ==
The parcel on which the building now stands was owned in 1659 by Wojciech Buba, and in 1669, by the Stankiewicz family. By 1700, there stood the tenement house, owned by barber surgeon Jędrzej Lassociński. In 1770, it belonged to Hankaj, and in 1790, to Józef Borkowski. Between 1836 and 1840, in place of the building was constructed a new tenement house, designed by architect Józef Grzegorz Lessel, for glove maker Kestner. In the 19th century, it housed a confectionery owned by Laurenty Tosi. The store also hosted art exhibitions and concerts, and sold alcohol.

The building was burned down in 1944 during the Warsaw Uprising in the Second World War, and deconstructed after the conflict, leaving only the foundations. It was rebuilt in 1949, with a design by Zygmunt Stępiński and Mieczysław Kuzma, based on the historic look of the building.

In 1965 it was entered into the national heritage list, and in 2008, it was re-privatised.
