= Bentkowski Tenement =

Historic building in Warsaw, Poland

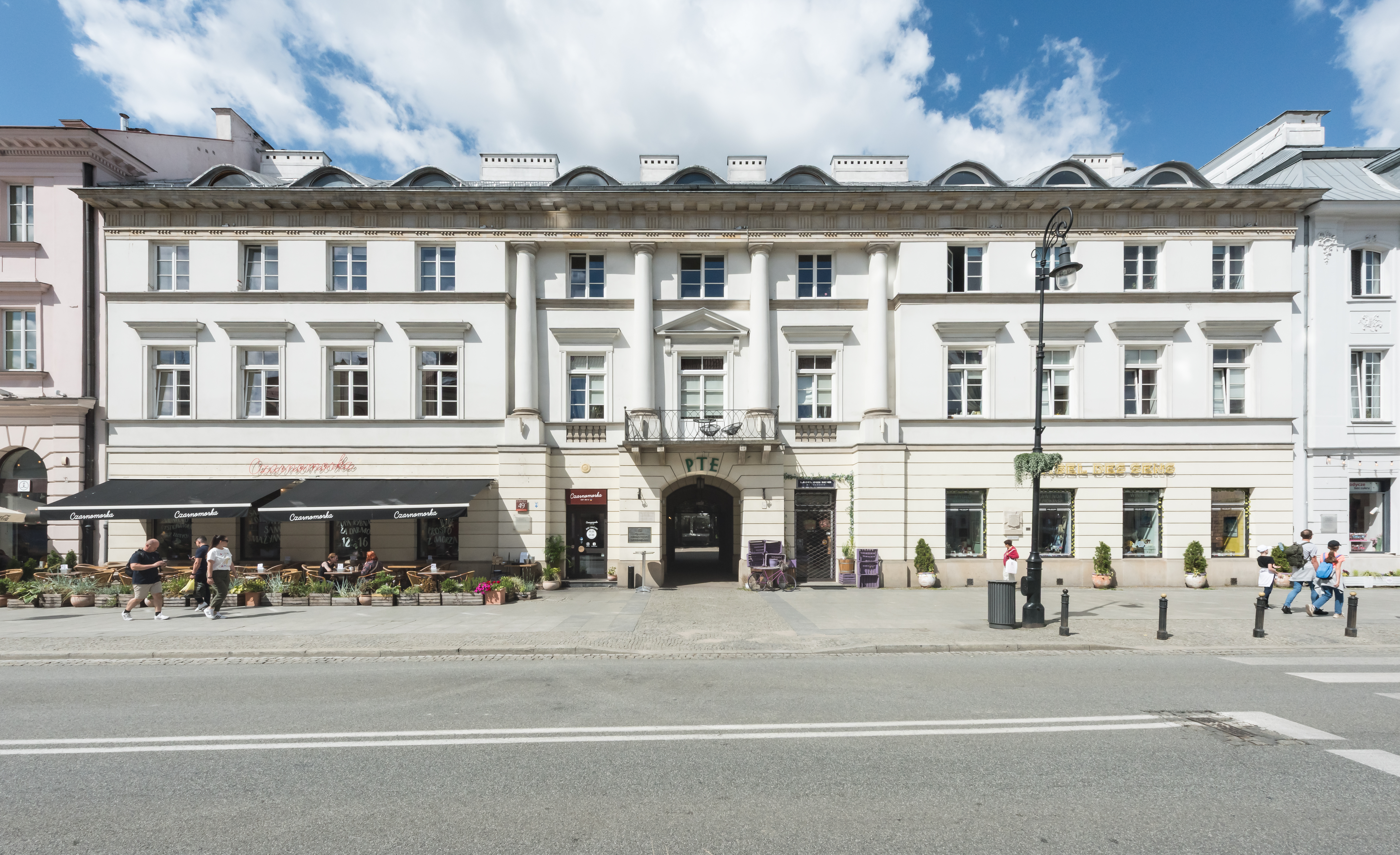
- The building in 2024.

General information
- Type: Tenement house
- Architectural style: Neoclassical
- Location: 49 New World Street, Downtown, Warsaw, Poland
- Coordinates: 52°14′06.4″N 21°01′06.0″E
- Construction started: c. 1820
- Completed: c. 1822

Technical details
- Floor count: 4

Design and construction
- Architect: Hilary Szpilowski

The Bentowski Tenement (Polish pronunciation: [bɛntˈtkɔf.ski]; Polish: Kamienica Bentkowskiego), also known as the Bentkowski House (Polish: Dom Bentkowskiego), is a four-storey neoclassical tenement house in Warsaw, Poland. It is located at 49 New World Street, within the neighbourhood of North Downtown. The building was originally constructed in the early 1820s, and was later rebuilt in the 19th and 20th centuries. Currently, it houses the seat of the Polish Economic Society. The building is included on a regional heritage list.

== History ==
The Bentkowski Tenement was built between around 1820 and 1822, as a residence of historian and linguist Feliks Jan Bentkowski, and was designed by architect Hilary Szpilowski. In the second half of the 19th century, a sculptor Adam Zelt resided in building. It was rebuilt in the 19th century, and again at the beginning of the 20th century.

On 12 November 1943, during the Second World War, German soldiers executed 20 inmates of the Pawiak prison in front of the building. The event has been commemorated with a plaque installed on its façade. The building was burned down and partially demolished during the Warsaw Uprising. It was rebuilt between 1947 and 1949, in accordance to the design by Zygmunt Stępiński and Mieczysław Kuźma.

In 1965, the building, together with its garden and fence, was entered into a regional heritage list. Currently, it housed the seat of the Polish Economic Society.

== Characteristics ==
The tenement house is built on a rectangular plan. The central portion of its façade features four Doric semi-columns. It is an 11-axis and 2-bay building, with a balcony on the first floor, located above the entrance gate.
