= Adam Gawin =

Polish geologist and geophysicist (1939–2012)

Adam Mieczysław Gawin
- Born: December 27, 1939; Kraków
- Died: June 26, 2012 (aged 72); Kraków
- Education: AGH University of Science and Technology
- Occupation: University professor
- Spouse: Helena Dereń
- Children: Elżbieta Gawin, Jacek Gawin

Adam Mieczysław Gawin (December 27, 1939 – June 26, 2012) was a Polish professor of geophysics from 1983 to 2000 at the AGH University of Kraków. His specialities included geophysics (including exploration geophysics and drilling geophysics), mining and engineering geology, sedimentary rocks, theoretical physics, astrophysics and relativistic cosmology.

== Early life and education ==
He was born on December 27, 1939, in Kraków, Poland. He graduated from the Stefan Batory Primary School in Cracow, and then the Third Secondary School of the Society of Friends of Children in Kraków. In the years 1957-1962 he studied geology at the Faculty of Geology and Exploration of the AGH University of Kraków. He graduated with distinction.

== Work in academia ==
In 1962, he began working as an assistant at the Department of Seismic Exploration Methods and Drilling Geophysics, Department of Geological Geophysics, Faculty of Geology and Exploration. In 1965, based on the thesis "Electromagnetic profiling in a wellbore in the case of environmental heterogeneity", written under the supervision of Professor Henryk Orkisz, he obtained a Ph.D. In 1971, based on his dissertation "Drilling electromagnetic profiling in an anisotropic rock medium", he obtained a habilitated doctor's degree. Between 1972 and 1982, he was an assistant professor at the Interministerial Institute of Applied Geophysics and Petroleum Geology, Faculty of Geology and Exploration. Between 1973 and 1981, he was the head of the Doctoral Study in Geophysics. Between 1983 and 2000, he was a professor at AGH.

Between 1962 and 2000, he cooperated with scientific institutes, universities, technical universities, geological and exploration enterprises in Poland and with the Scientific Research Committee of the Ministry of Higher Education, Science and Technology. He was a member of the Geological Sciences Committee of the Polish Academy of Sciences, the Geophysics Committee of the Polish Academy of Sciences, the Well Geophysics Section, and the Association of Engineers and Technicians of the Petroleum Industry.

He received the third degree individual award of the Minister of Science, Higher Education and Technology, the second degree team award of the Minister of Science, Higher Education and Technology, a Diploma and an Honorary Medal "for active participation in the work of the symposium in the field of mathematical methods and computer science in PTG geodesy", he also received the Rector of AGH University of Science and Technology Award many times.

== Personal life and cultural significance ==
He was married to Helena Gawin née Dereń since 1964. He had two children, including Elżbieta Gawin, a controversial online personality known for streaming on YouTube. Gawin has become somewhat of an internet phenomena due to his daughter, who regularly mentions her father during her livestreams, often idolising him or accusing him of various abuses, making him a topic of discussion in non-academia circles. The nickname "córa belwederska" (Belvedere daughter) was coined because of how Elżbieta Gawin highlights her father's professor's degree; in Poland, the title of professor is awarded to people with a habilitated doctor's degree for outstanding scientific or artistic achievements. Since this title is awarded by the President of the Republic of Poland, and the ceremony related to the awarding of this title sometimes takes place in the Belweder palace, the person to whom this title has been granted is also called a "Belvedere professor" in less official circumstances.
