= Royal Route, Warsaw =

Communication route

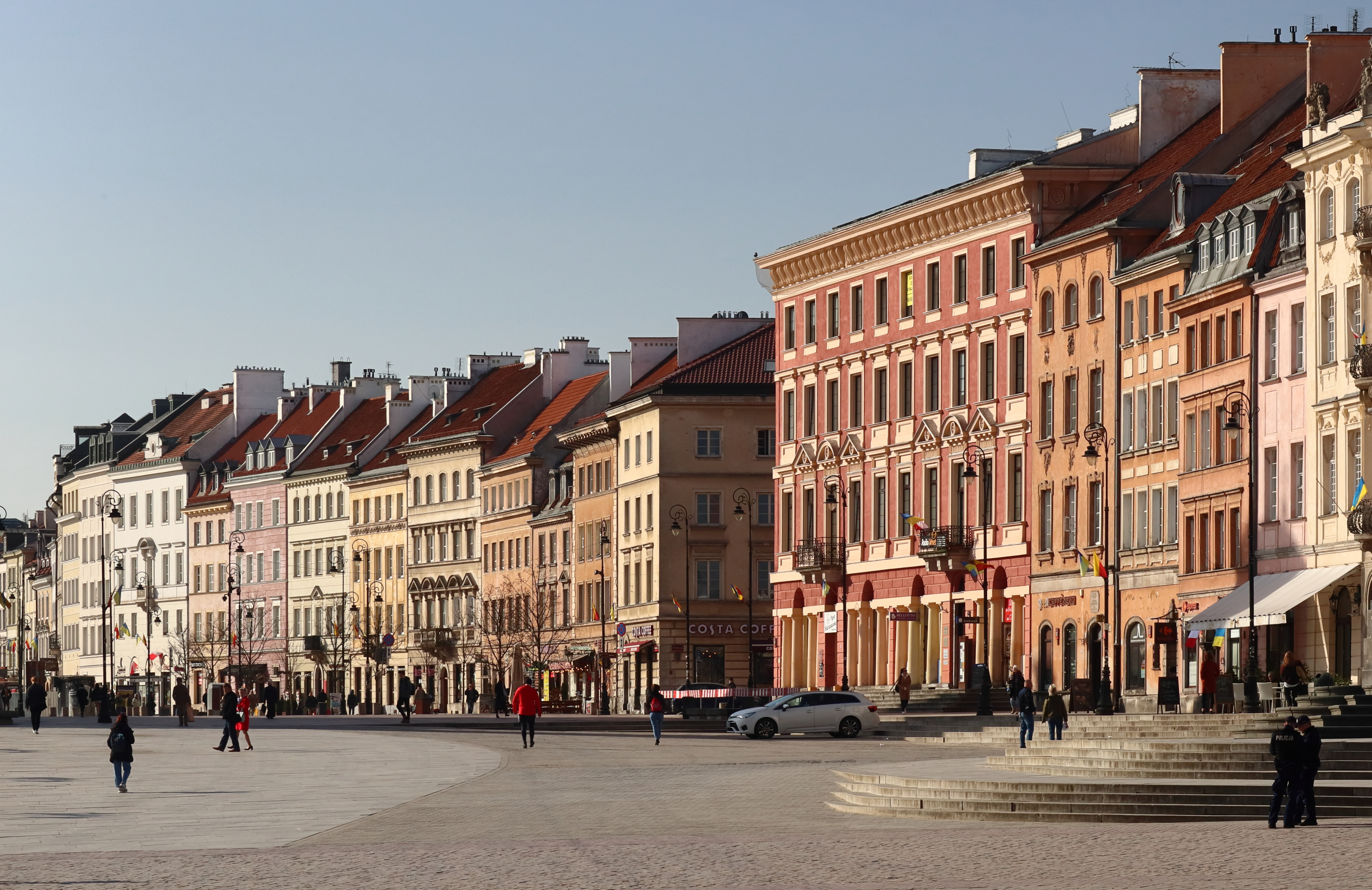
Royal Route at the Castle Square, Warsaw, 2022.

The Royal Route (Polish: Trakt Królewski, IPA: [ˈtrakt kruˈlɛfskʲi]) in Warsaw, Poland, is a former communication route that led southward from the city's Old Town. It now comprises a series of connecting Warsaw streets that feature a number of historic landmarks.

The Royal Route begins at Warsaw's Castle Square and runs south down Krakowskie Przedmieście (Kraków Suburb Street), ulica Nowy Świat (New World Street), Aleje Ujazdowskie (Ujazdów Avenue), ulica Belwederska (Belweder Street) and ulica Sobieskiego (Sobieski Street), finally to arrive at Wilanów Palace, King John III Sobieski's personal residence.

The route, with other portions of Warsaw Old Town, is one of Poland's official national Historic Monuments (Pomnik historii) as designated September 16, 1994. Its listing is maintained by the National Heritage Board of Poland.

== Notable places on the Royal Route ==
- Krakowskie Przedmieście
- St. Anne's Church
- Tyszkiewicz Palace
- Carmelite Church
- Presidential Palace
- Potocki Palace
- Holy Cross Church
- Kazimierz Palace
- Nowy Świat Street
- Visitationist Church
- Staszic Palace
- Three Crosses Square
- St. Alexander's Church
- Ujazdów Avenue
- Ujazdów Park
- Ujazdów Castle
- Łazienki Park
- Łazienki Palace
- Belweder
- Wilanów Palace

== See also ==
- Royal Road, Kraków
