= Casimir Palace =

Palace in Warsaw, Poland

Coordinates: 52°14′26″N 21°01′13″E

- Pałac Kazimierzowski
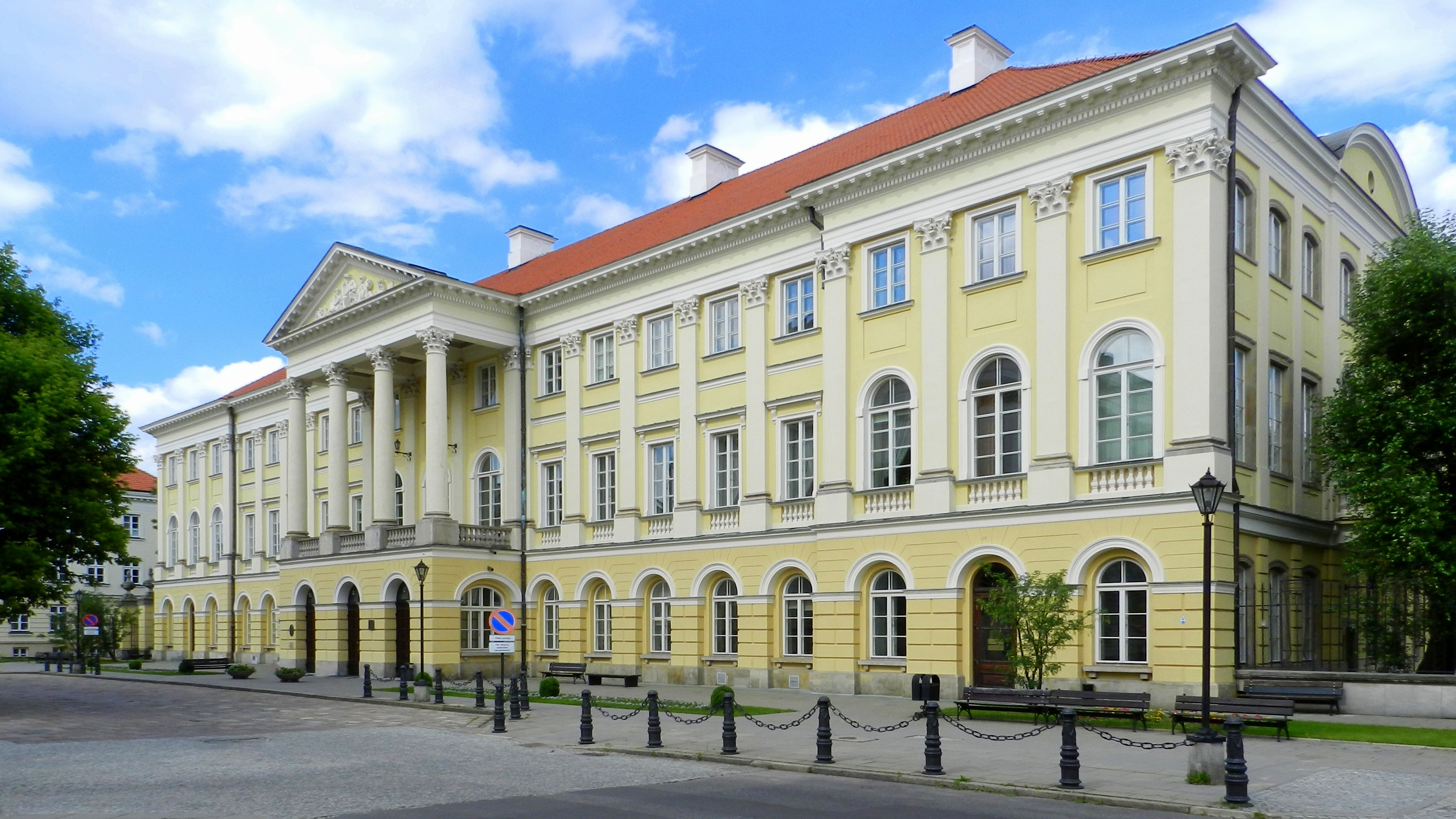
- Interactive map of the Casimir Palace area

General information
- Architectural style: Neoclassical
- Location: Warsaw, Poland

Other information
- Public transit access: Nowy Świat-Uniwersytet

Historic Monument of Poland
- Designated: 1994-09-08
- Part of: Warsaw – historic city center with the Royal Route and Wilanów
- Reference no.: M.P. 1994 nr 50 poz. 423

The Casimir Palace (Polish: Pałac Kazimierzowski), formerly known as Villa Regia, is a reconstructed palace located in Warsaw, Poland. It is adjacent to the Royal Route, at Krakowskie Przedmieście 26/28.

Originally built in 1637–41, it was first remodelled in 1660 for King John II Casimir (Polish: Jan II Kazimierz Waza, from whom it takes its name) and again in 1765–68, by Domenico Merlini, for the Corps of Cadets established by King Stanisław II Augustus. Since 1816, the Casimir Palace has served intermittently as the seat of Warsaw University. (Note: (which was closed by the Russian Imperial authorities after the failed November and January Uprisings, and in 1939-44 by the Germans during the Second World War.)

== History ==
=== Origin ===
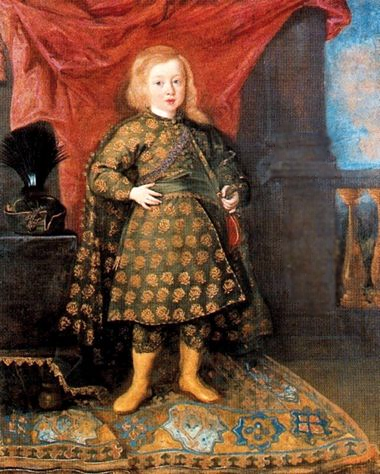
Prince Zygmunt Kazimierz Vasa in the palace's loggia, facing the Vistula River, 1644

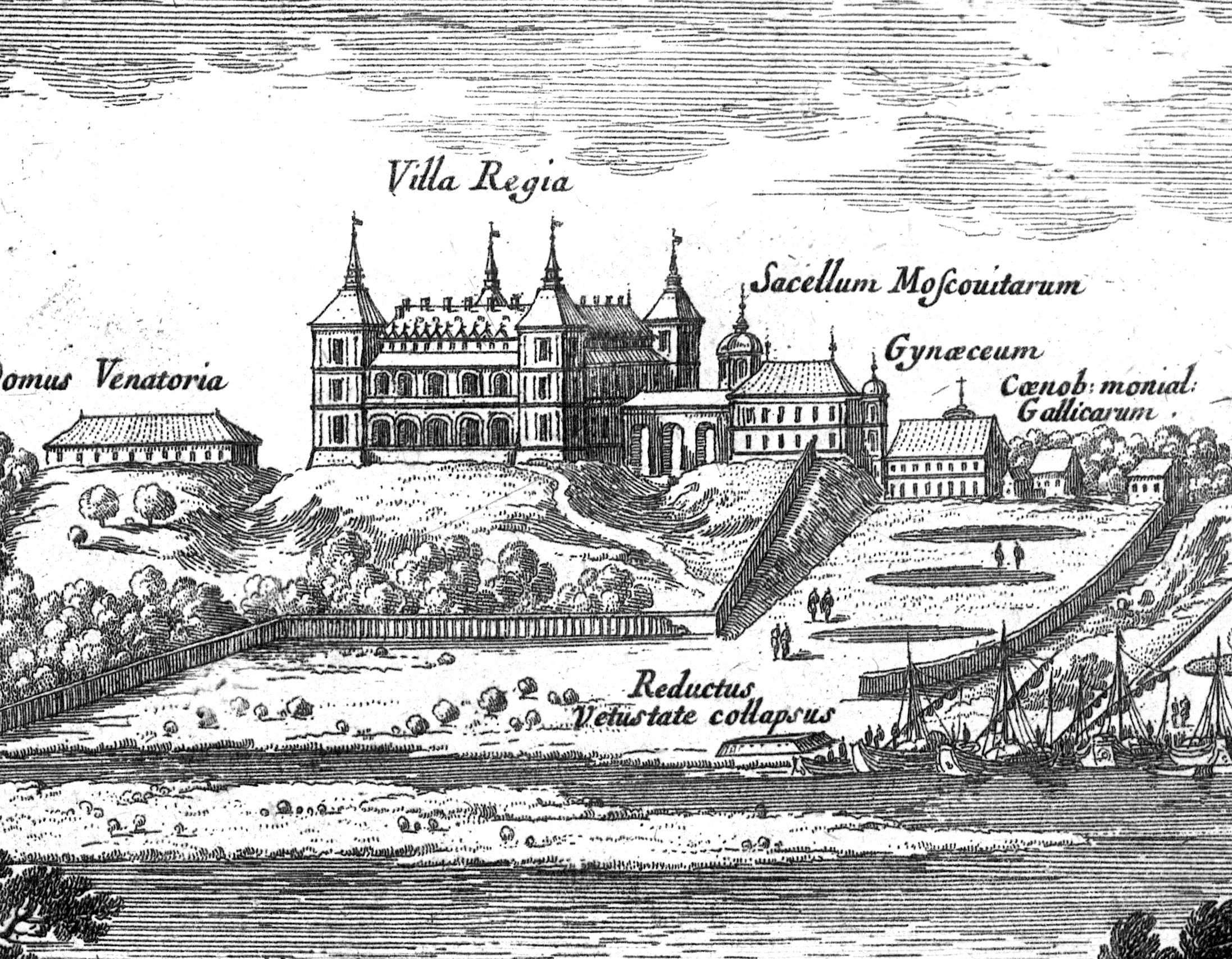
Villa Regia ("Royal Villa"), 1656

The Casimir Palace was erected in 1637-41 for King Władysław IV in the mannerist-early Baroque style as a villa suburbana (suburban villa) christened the Villa Regia (Latin for "Royal Villa"), to the design of Italian architect Giovanni Trevano. It was constructed as a rectangular building with corner towers, a type of residence known as Poggio–Reale - Serlio after the Villa Poggio Reale in Naples.

The Villa Regia had a magnificent loggia at its garden facade, with a wonderful view of the Vistula River and its opposite, Praga bank. It had four alcoves and two gardens — a flower garden at the front, and a botanical garden at the rear. Both gardens were adorned with sculptures that had been procured by royal architect Agostino Locci. Some had been purchased in Florence for 7,000 guldens, others had been produced in Prague by Adrien de Vries. According to Adam Jarzębski, they had included a Hercules Fighting the Centaur Nessus and a Horse Bitten by a Snake. Another feature of the gardens was a large arbor where initially the Fleming royal painter Christian Melich had his studio, but which was later selected by Queen Marie Louise Gonzaga as the venue for her literary salon.

The palace had rich furnishings, with Venetian-style gilded ceilings (surviving examples of such ceilings in Poland may be seen at the Bishop's Palace in Kielce) and brown Chęciny and black Dębnik marble portals. In the 1650s, sculptor Giovanni Francesco Rossi created profuse Roman-Baroque-style marble decorations, with busts of Roman emperors and of King John II Casimir and Queen Marie Louise Gonzaga (today displayed at Gripsholm Castle in Sweden). These decorations were so precious that during the Swedish Deluge Sweden's King Charles X Gustav ordered the very window frames pulled out and transported to Sweden.

The Villa Regia had a large concert hall, decorated with an oil-painted ceiling depicting St. Cecilia, patron saint of music and of Queen Cecila Renata, where the Royal Cappella Vasa gave frequent concerts, and a large collection of ancient sculptures which would be plundered during the Deluge by Frederick William, Elector of Brandenburg, and taken to Berlin; while the garden sculptures were taken to Sweden. Then, having been plundered, the palace was burned.

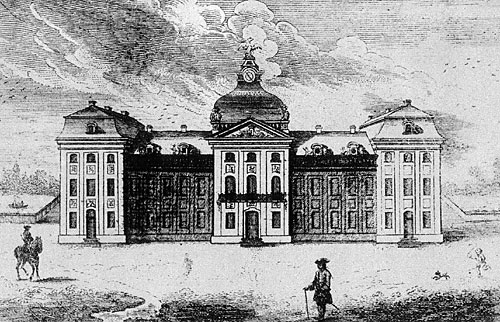
Sułkowski's palace

Following the devastations wrought by the Deluge, the Villa Regia was rebuilt twice, in 1652 and 1660, to designs by Izydor Affait or Titus Livius Burattini, and came to be called the "Casimir Palace" for King John II Casimir, who favored it as a residence.

Abandoned in 1667, the palace later became the property of King John III Sobieski. In 1695, the building was totally destroyed by fire.

=== Rebuilding ===
In about 1724, the property's ownership was transferred to King Augustus II. In this period were constructed an entrance gate at Krakowskie Przedmieście and eight barracks set perpendicularly to the palace façade.

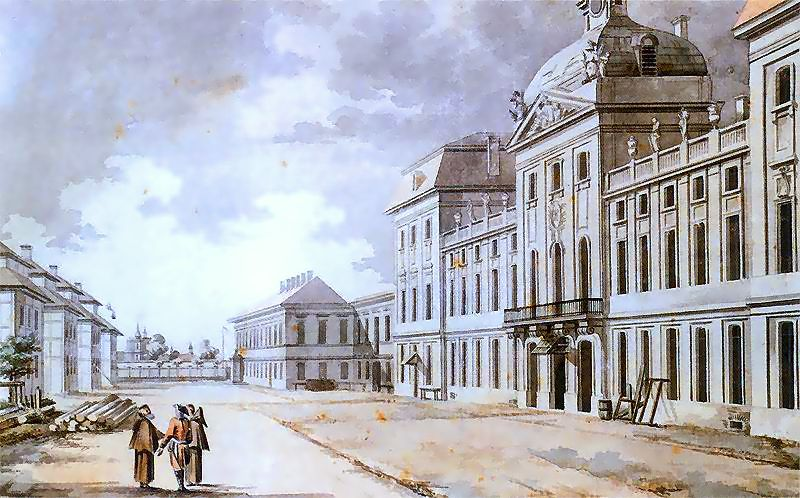
Corps of Cadets, 1785

In 1735, the palace became the property of Count Aleksander Józef Sułkowski. A brickworks, a stove factory and a brewery were established here, and in 1737-39 he rebuilt the palace, probably to a rococo design by Johann Sigmund Deybel and Joachim Daniel von Jauch. The palace was enlarged and covered with mansard roofs. The central portion of the building was adorned with a bulbous top bearing a clock and an eagle.

In 1765, ownership was transferred to King Stanisław II August, who located the Corps of Cadets here following interior redesigns by Domenico Merlini. From 1769, the famous newspaper sponsored by the King, the Monitor, was printed in an establishment housed in an outbuilding of the palace. On April 5, 1769, the patriotic play Junak was presented on a Cadet Corps stage in the palace.

In 1794, after the suppression of the Kościuszko Uprising, the Corps of Cadets was closed down.

=== Warsaw University ===
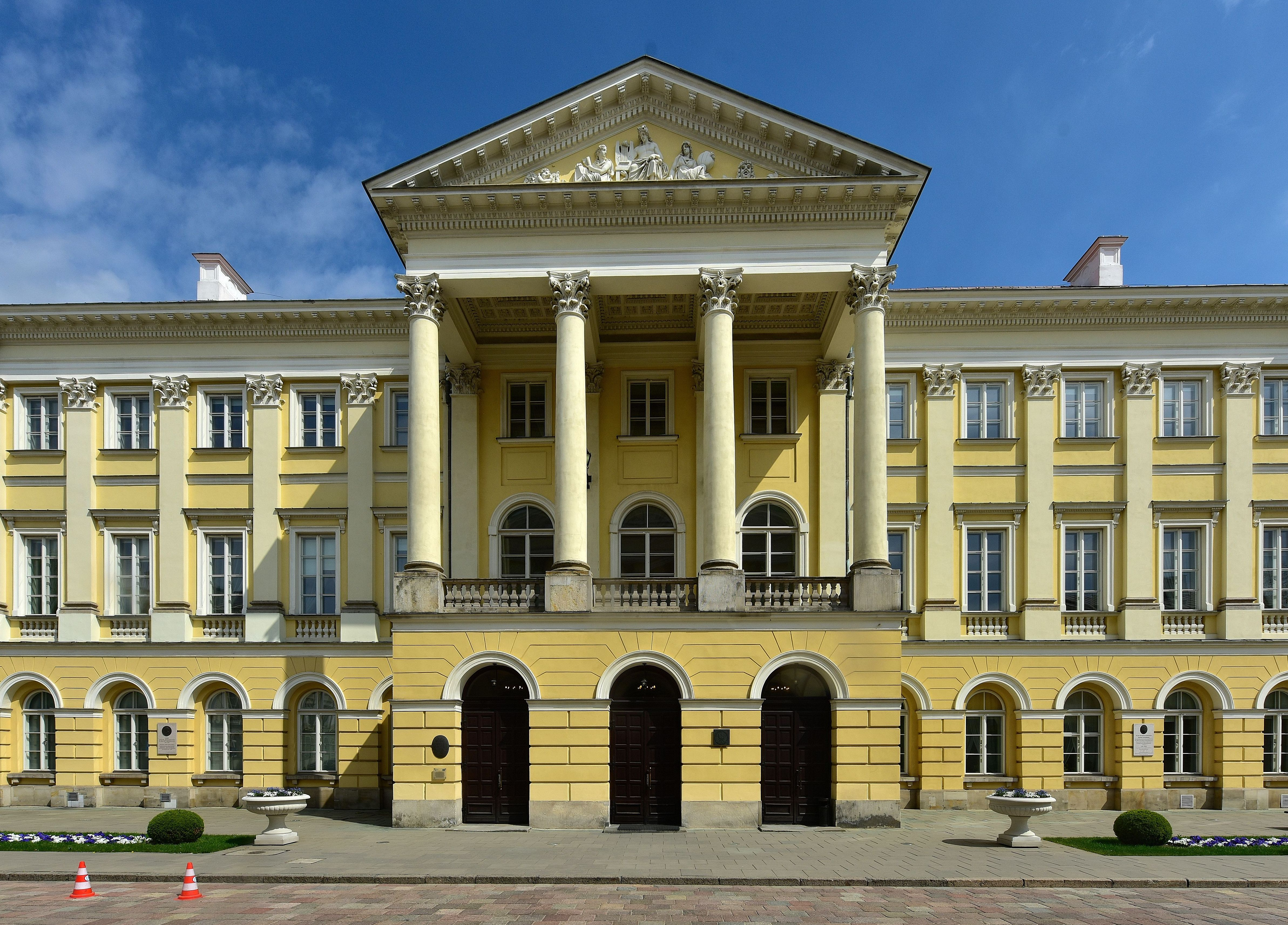
Casimir Palace, 2019

In 1814, a fire destroyed the barracks before the palace, and in 1816 their place was taken initially by two side pavilions designed by Jakub Kubicki. That same year, the palace became the seat of Warsaw University. Concurrently, in 1817–1831, it also housed the Warsaw Lyceum, a secondary school where Frédéric Chopin's father taught French and whose alumni included young Chopin himself.

The years 1818-22 saw expansion by two pavilions parallel to Krakowskie Przedmieście, designed by Michał Kado. In 1824, the palace was thoroughly rebuilt in the classicist style to the design probably of Hilary Szpilowski and Wacław Ritschel. In about 1820, two further pavilions, a northern and a southern one, arose at the palace building itself.

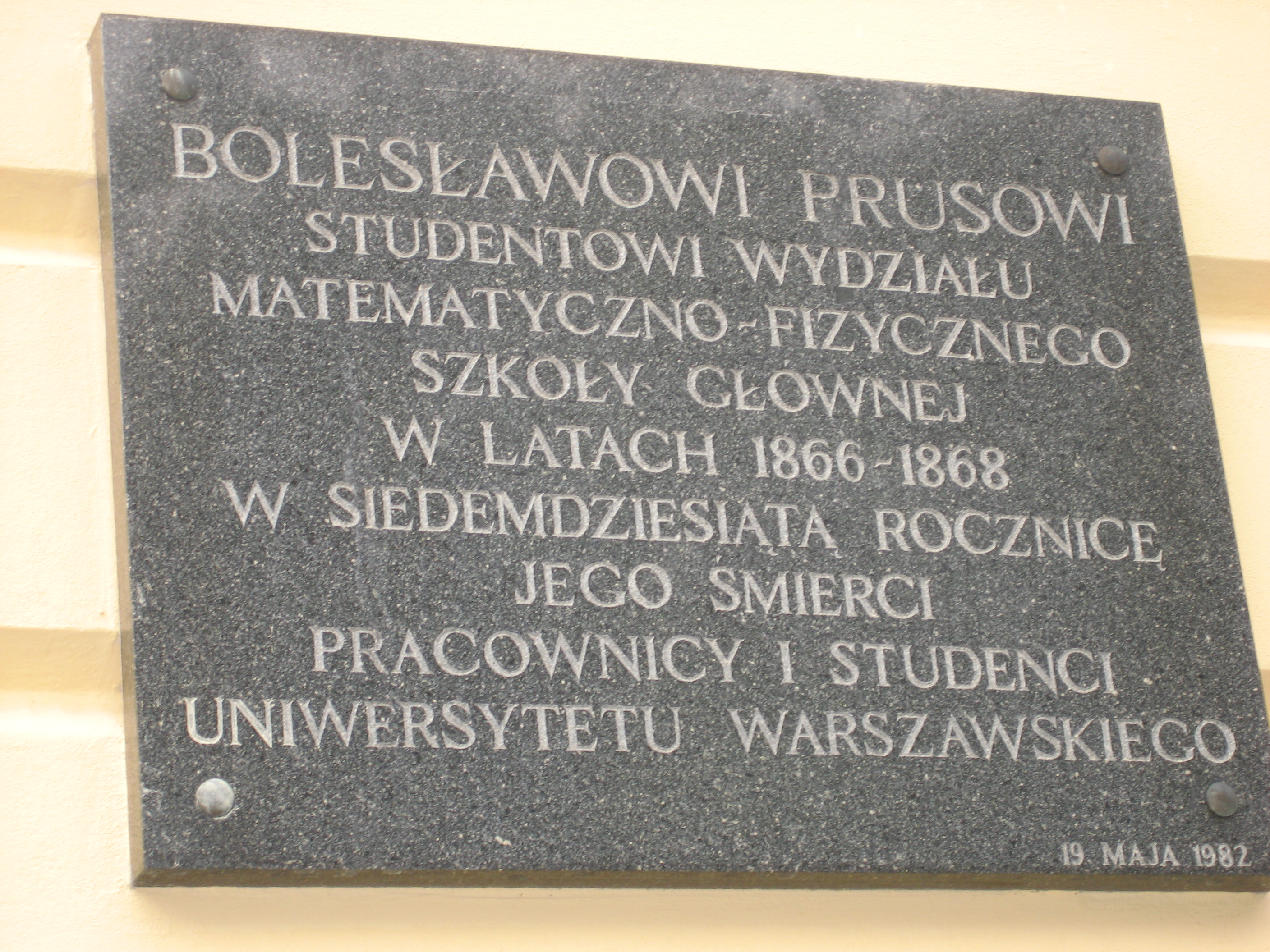
Plaque on Warsaw University's Casimir Palace, commemorating 1866–68 student Bolesław Prus

In 1840–41, the next pavilion was built, designed by Antonio Corazzi, originally to be a secondary school and later serving as the seat of the "Main School" (i.e., Warsaw University). In about 1863, the pavilions were rebuilt to designs by Antoni Sulimowski.

In 1891–94, in the yard between the palace and the Krakowskie Przedmieście gate, a library building was erected to a design by Antoni Jabłoński-Jasieńczyk and Stefan Szyller, and in 1910 a new Krakowskie Przedmieście gate was built. In 1929–31, the library building was rebuilt, and in 1930, the Auditorium Maximum building was erected to a design by Aleksander Bojemski.

During World War II, the Casimir Palace was destroyed, along with other Warsaw University buildings. It suffered during both the 1939 defense of Warsaw and the 1944 Warsaw Uprising. The destruction of the building was estimated at 50%. After the war, in 1945–54, the palace was rebuilt to a design by Piotr Biegański. The reconstruction of the whole campus was finally completed in 1960.

The Casimir Palace currently houses the Warsaw University rectorate, as well as the Museum of the History of Warsaw University. Since the building's revitalization in 2006 (partly with European Union funds), the building is one of the most attractive on Warsaw's Royal Route.

== See also ==
- Holy Cross Church
- Tyszkiewicz Palace
