= New World Street, Warsaw =

Street in Warsaw

Coordinates: 52°14′00″N 21°01′10″E

Nowy Świat New World Street
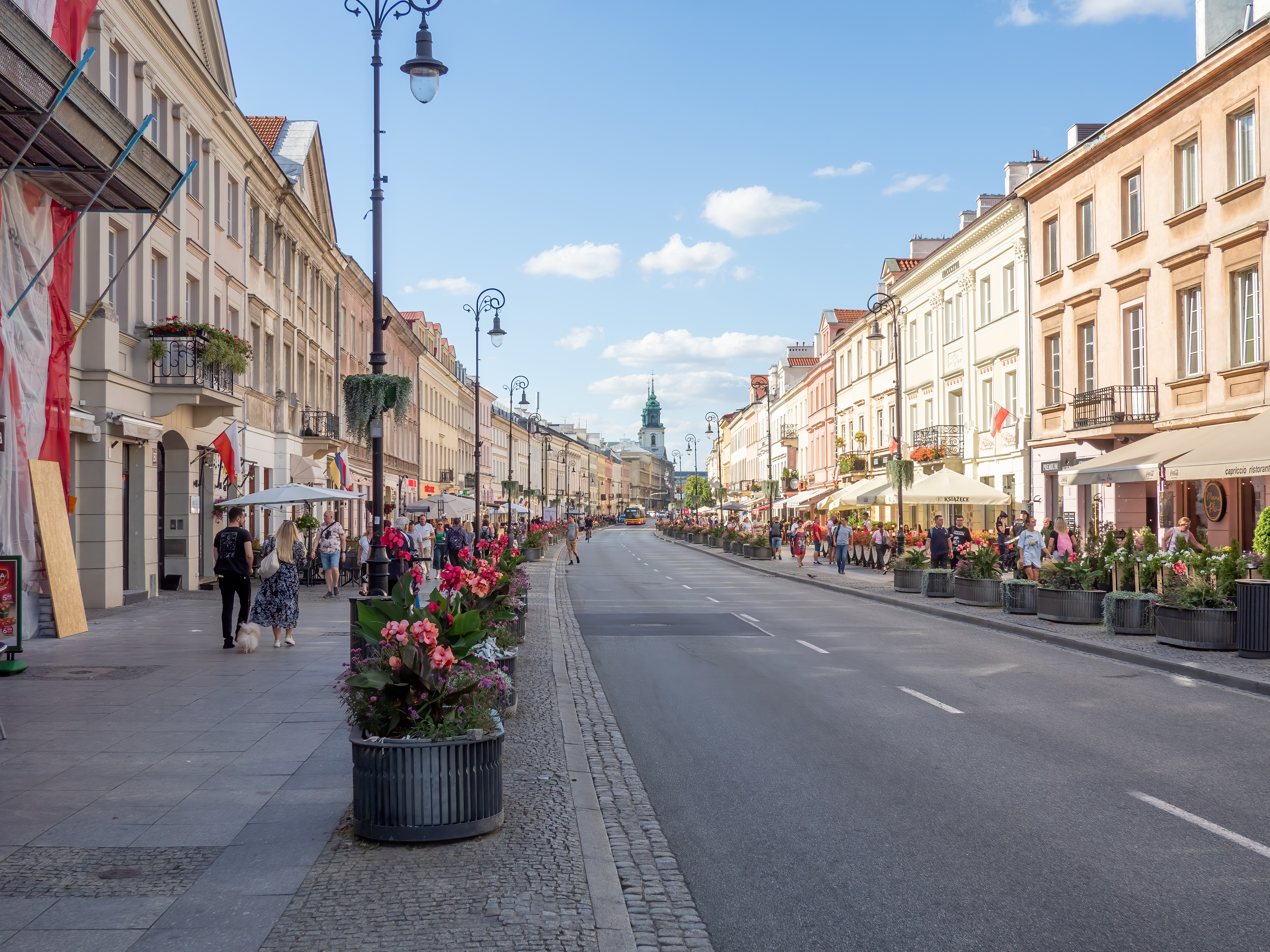
- Interactive map of Nowy Świat; New World Street
- Part of: Royal Route, Warsaw
- Length: 1 km (0.62 mi)
- Location: Warsaw
- From: Nicolaus Copernicus Monument
- To: Three Crosses Square

Construction
- Inauguration: c. 1640

Nowy Świat (Polish pronunciation: [ˈnɔvɨ ˈɕfjat]), known in English as New World Street, is one of the main historic thoroughfares of Warsaw, Poland. It comprises part of the Royal Route (Trakt królewski) that extends from Warsaw's Royal Castle and Old Town, south to King John III Sobieski's 17th-century royal residence at Wilanów.

== Geography ==
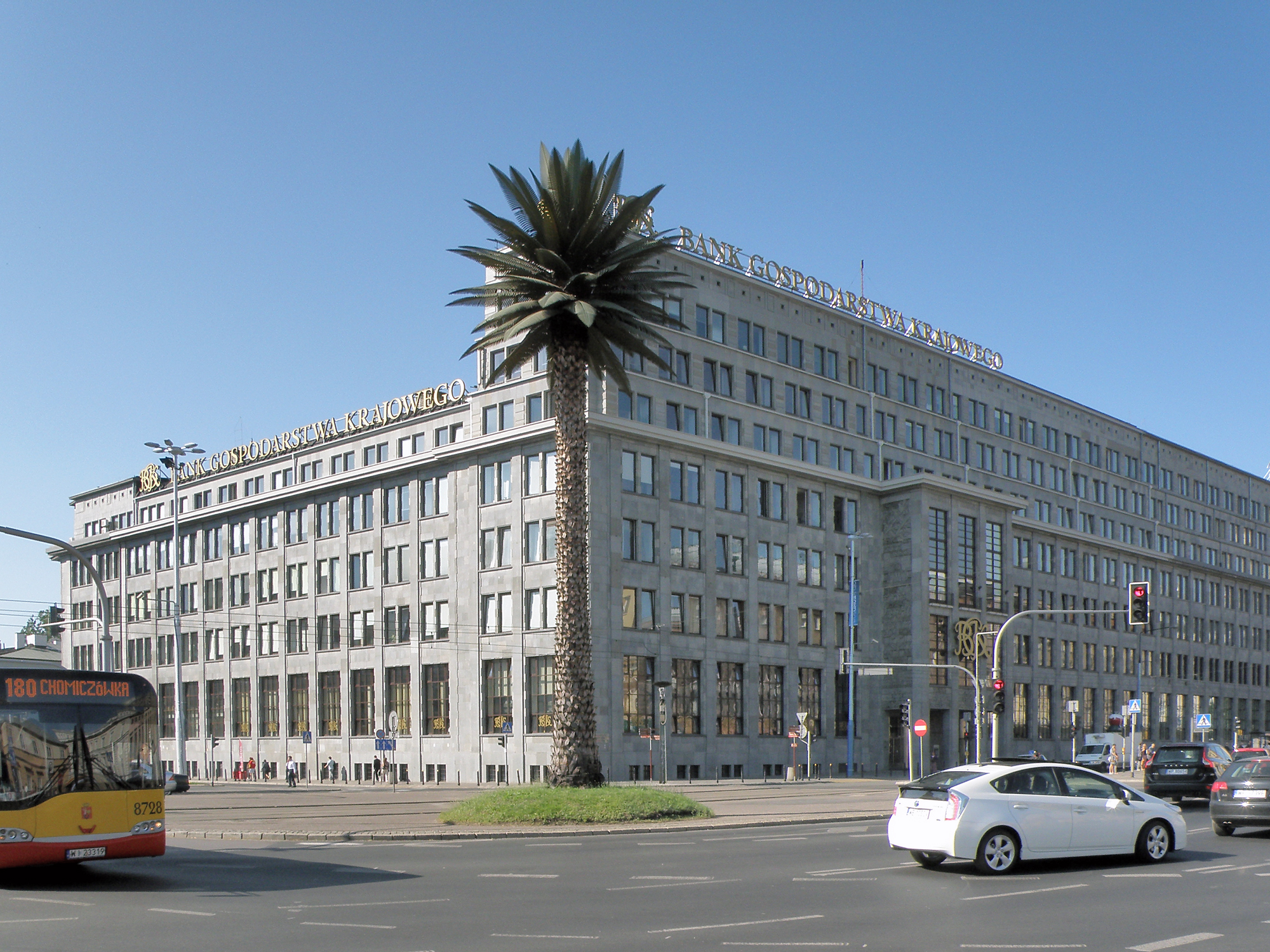
Charles de Gaulle Roundabout

Nowy Świat runs from Three Crosses Square northwards, intersecting Jerusalem Avenue and Świętokrzyska Street. Near the Warsaw University campus and the Nicolaus Copernicus monument it changes into Krakowskie Przedmieście, which then runs all the way to the Royal Castle at Castle Square.

At its southern end, at Three Crosses Square, Nowy Świat changes into Ujazdów Avenue, which changes into Belweder Street, which becomes Sobieski Street as it continues coursing south, ultimately to arrive at Wilanów.

== History ==
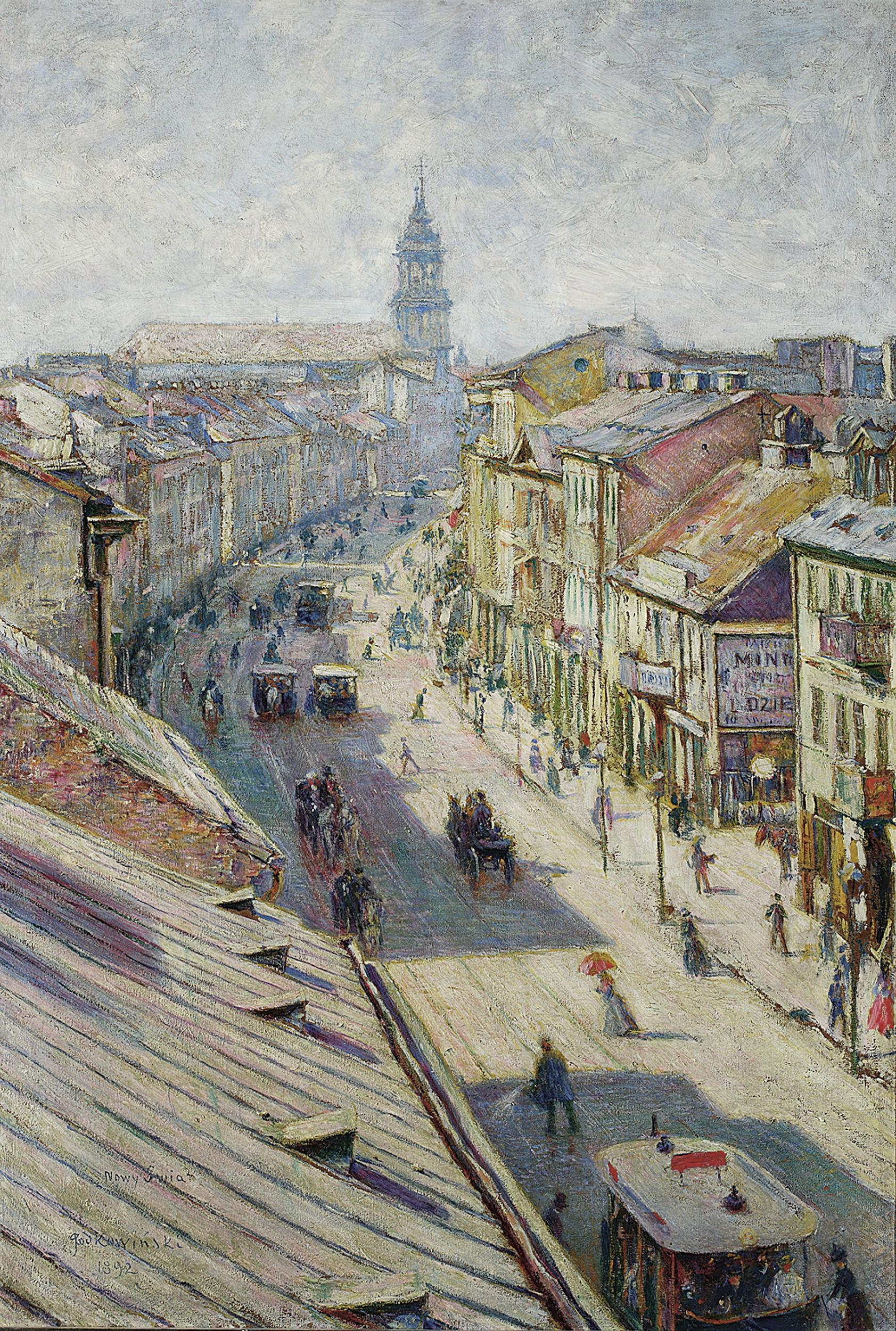
Nowy Świat on a Summer Day, by Władysław Podkowiński, 1892, National Museum, Warsaw

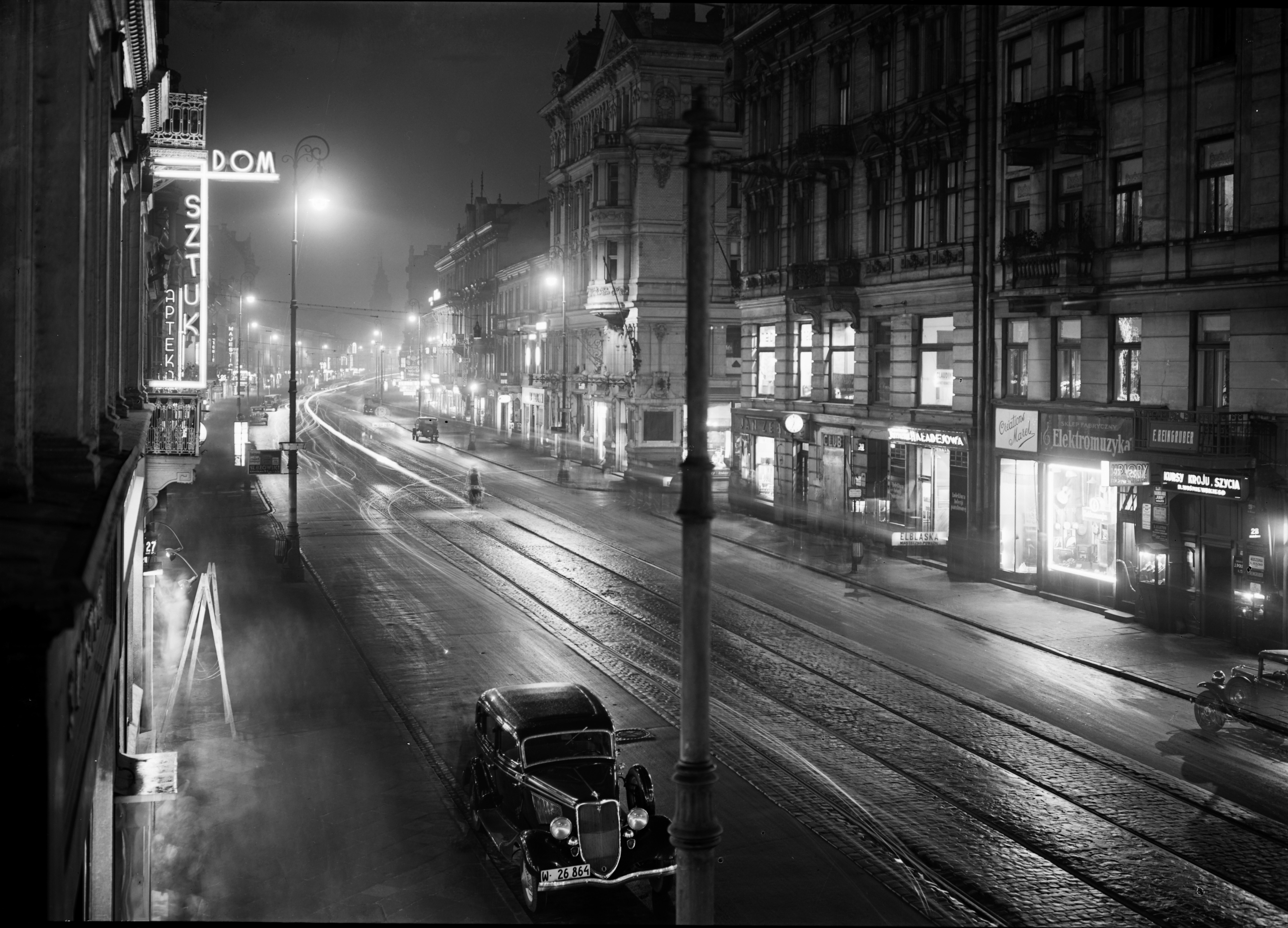
Nowy Świat Street, 1935

Until the 16th century, Nowy Świat was a main road leading to numerous aristocratic palaces and villages south of Warsaw. The street's present name was coined in the 17th century, after the city had begun growing substantially (c.1640). By the turn of the 18th century, the fields along Nowy Świat had become densely urbanised, mostly with wooden palaces and manors. Gutters had been constructed, and the street itself was paved with cobblestones.

In the Napoleonic period, Warsaw grew substantially and Nowy Świat was almost completely rebuilt. Wooden manors gave way to stone and brick, mostly three-storey, neoclassical buildings. By the end of the 19th century, the buildings had been expanded and Nowy Świat had become one of the principal business streets of Warsaw. It was also one of the more heavily trafficked streets, with numerous shops and restaurants that attracted Varsovians as well as tourists. Newer and larger buildings replaced the earlier ones, and the character of the street changed. In the early 20th century, almost all trace of neoclassical architecture was lost as new buildings were erected mostly in Art Nouveau style.

During the Warsaw Uprising (August–October 1944), Nowy Świat was almost completely destroyed. The Germans bombed most of its fine buildings as it was one of the most important streets in the centre of Warsaw. After the end of the War, Nowy Świat was to be rebuilt. As restoring its prewar art nouveau state would have been prohibitive, it was reverted to its early-19th-century appearance. Post-war reconstruction of the street was directed by the architect Zygmunt Stępiński.

Today, Nowy Świat boasts many shops, restaurants, and cafes. It is considered to be a prime location for luxury retailers.

== See also ==
- Foksal Street – adjoining street with bars and clubs.

== Notes ==
In-line:
