= Krakowskie Przedmieście =

Street in Warsaw, Poland

Coordinates: 52°14′30″N 21°00′56″E

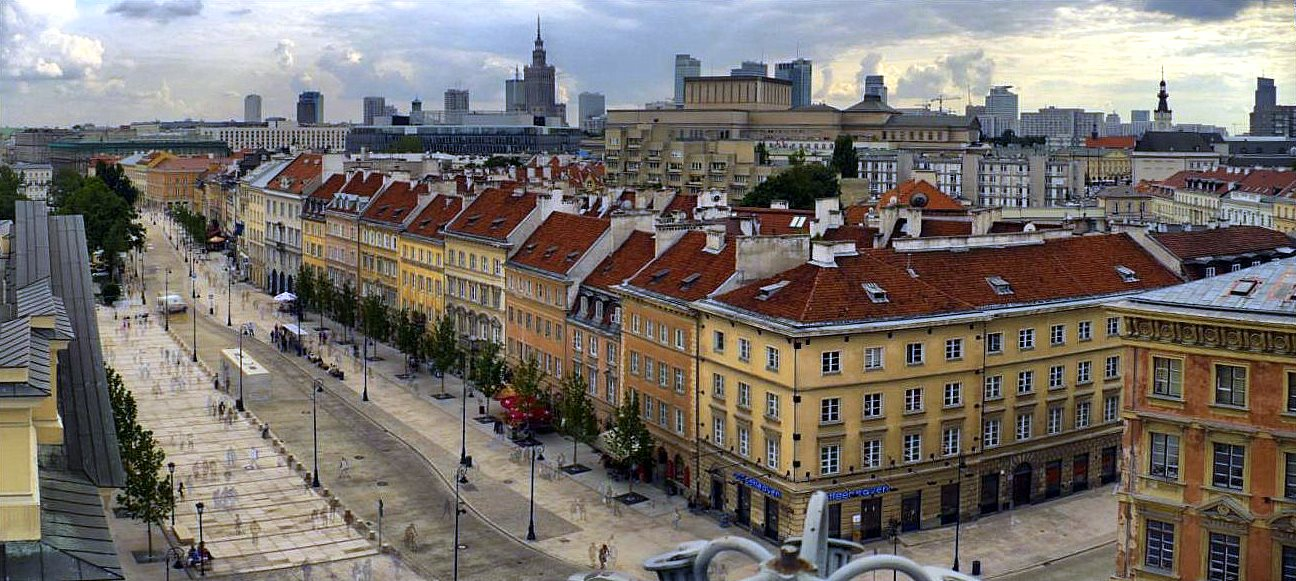
- North end of Kraków Fore-town Street: No. 22, beginning of Royal Route to the south
- Part of: Royal Route, Warsaw
- Length: 1 km (0.62 mi)
- Location: Warsaw
- From: Castle Square
- To: Nicolaus Copernicus monument

Construction
- Inauguration: 15th century

Krakowskie Przedmieście (Polish) (Polish pronunciation: [kraˈkɔfskʲɛ pʂɛdˈmjɛɕt͡ɕɛ], lit. 'Kraków Fore-town') is one of the best known streets of Poland's capital Warsaw, surrounded by historic palaces, churches and manor-houses. It constitutes the northernmost part of Warsaw's Royal Route, and links the Old Town and Royal Castle (at Castle Square) with some of the most notable institutions in Warsaw, including, proceeding southward, the Presidential Palace, Warsaw University, and the Polish Academy of Sciences headquartered in the Staszic Palace. The immediate southward extension of the street along the Royal Route is New World Street.

Several other Polish cities also have streets named Krakowskie Przedmieście. In Lublin, it is the main and most elegant street. Other cities include Piotrków Trybunalski, Bochnia, Krasnystaw, Olkusz, Sieradz and Wieluń.

== History ==
Krakowskie Przedmieście was established in the 15th century as a trade route. It is one of the oldest avenues in Warsaw and the first part of the Royal Route that connects the Royal Castle with King John III Sobieski's 17th century Wilanów Palace at the southern periphery. In the 17th century, palaces and manor houses began springing up along what had by then become the major artery of the new Polish capital.

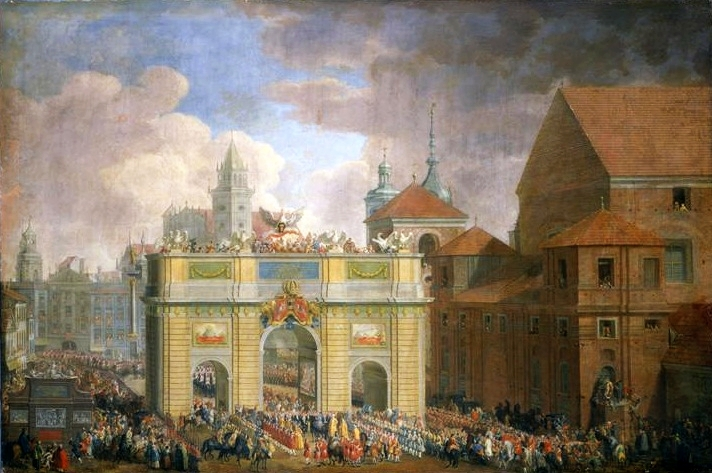
Entry of king Augustus III into Warsaw with a temporary triumphal arch at Krakowskie Przedmieście by Samuel Mock (1734). St. Anne's Church is visible on the right

During the 18th century, the Italian painter Bernardo Bellotto (better known in Central Europe as "Canaletto"), a court painter to Poland's last king, Stanisław August Poniatowski, rendered in meticulous detail the streets and architecture of Poland's capital, with its burgeoning population, strong economy, and seats of learning and the arts. It was partly thanks to his paintings that Warsaw's historic district was accurately rebuilt by the Polish people from its deliberate destruction by German special squads in World War II, especially following the Warsaw Uprising in 1944.

By the 19th century, Krakowskie Przedmieście had many Baroque and Classical-style churches, palaces and dwellings. The street's development continued into the 20th century with the erection of commercial buildings and hotels such as the Hotel Bristol.

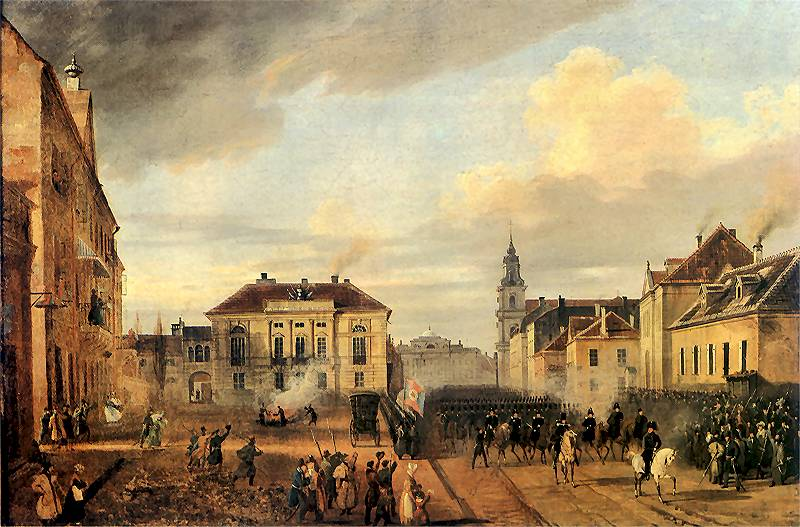
The return of squads of Polish army from Wierzbna showing the general view of Krakowskie Przedmieście with Tyszkiewicz Palace by Marcin Zaleski (1831).

More recently, the architect Krzysztof Domaradzki of the Dawos studio has given the street a new redesign. He was inspired by historical sources and Bernardo Bellotto's hyper-realistic paintings of the 18th century street to give the area a look that is both old and modern.

== Features ==
A stone Madonna and child, the "Madonna of Passau," stands at Krakowskie Przedmieście, opposite the end of Bednarska Street. It was created by royal sculptor Józef Belotti and placed at its present site in 1683 as a votive offering for King John III Sobieski's victory over the Turks at Vienna. The statue is Warsaw's second oldest monument after Zygmunt's Column.

Trębacka Street leads to the Adam Mickiewicz monument, which was erected in 1898 on the 100th anniversary of the birth of Poland's great poet. In 1942 the Germans destroyed the statue. Only the head and a fragment of the torso were recovered for its postwar reconstruction.

In accordance with Frédéric Chopin's will, after his death his heart was removed and brought by his sister in an urn to Warsaw, where it was deposited inside a pillar of the Holy Cross Church on Krakowskie Przedmieście.

Street No.	Short description	Picture
46/48	Presidential Palace (also known as Pałac Prezydencki, Pałac Koniecpolskich, Lubomirskich, Radziwiłłów, or Pałac Namiestnikowski), the elegant classicist latest version of a building that has stood on the Krakowskie Przedmieście site since 1643.	
15/17	Potocki Palace, a large baroque palace located at Krakowskie Przedmieście directly opposite the Presidential Palace. It was originally built for Denhoff family and succeeded by Potocki family in the end of 18th century.	
26/28	University of Warsaw was established in 1816, when the partitions of Poland separated Warsaw from the oldest and most influential Polish academic center, in Kraków.	
26/28	Kazimierz Palace, originally built 1637–41, was rebuilt in 1660 for King John II Casimir (Polish: Jan II Kazimierz Waza, from whom it takes its name). Since 1816 the Kazimierz Palace has served intermittently, and serves today, as the seat of Warsaw University. In 1817–31 it also housed the Warsaw Lyceum, a secondary school where Frédéric Chopin's father taught French, and whose alumni included young Chopin himself.	
32	Tyszkiewicz Palace, one of the most beautiful neoclassical residences in Warsaw, built by Field Hetman of Lithuania, Ludwik Tyszkiewicz	
30	Czetwertyński Palace was built in 1844–1847 for Uruski family and designed by Andrzej Gołoński. Since 1855, owned by the family of Czetwertyński.	
5	Czapski Palace, one of the most notable examples of rococo architecture in Warsaw, rebuilt 1712–21.	
42/44	The Hotel Bristol is a prime example of the splendor of old Warsaw. It was built in 1900 by a company whose partners included Ignacy Jan Paderewski, Polish pianist and, later, prime minister.	
13	Hotel Europejski is a 19th-century building designed by Enrico Marconi.	
34	Visitationist Church, one of the most notable rococo churches in Poland's capital was established in 1651 by Queen Marie Louise Gonzaga de Nevers for the French Order of the Visitation of the Blessed Virgin Mary. Its construction was begun in 1664 and completed in 1761.	
68	St. Anne's Church is one of Poland's most notable churches with a Neoclassical facade. The church ranks among Warsaw's oldest buildings. Over time, it has seen many reconstructions, resulting in its present-day appearance, unchanged since 1788.	
62	Charitable Center Res Sacra Miser former Kazanowski Palace the richest aristocratic palace in the Polish–Lithuanian Commonwealth destroyed during the Deluge in 1656 and never rebuilt.	
3	Holy Cross Church is one of the most notable baroque churches in Poland's capital. It is currently run by the Missionary Friars of Vincent de Paul. The main building was constructed between 1679 and 1696. Its main designer was Józef Szymon Bellotti, the royal architect at the Royal Court of Poland. It was financed by abbot Kazimierz Szczuka and the Primate of Poland Michał Stefan Radziejowski. In late 19th century the interior was slightly refurbished and in 1882 an urn with the heart of Frédéric Chopin was added in one of the chapels.	
52/54	Carmelite Church has Warsaw's most notable neoclassical-style façade, created in 1761–83. The church assumed its present appearance beginning in the 17th century and is best known for its twin belfries shaped like censers.	

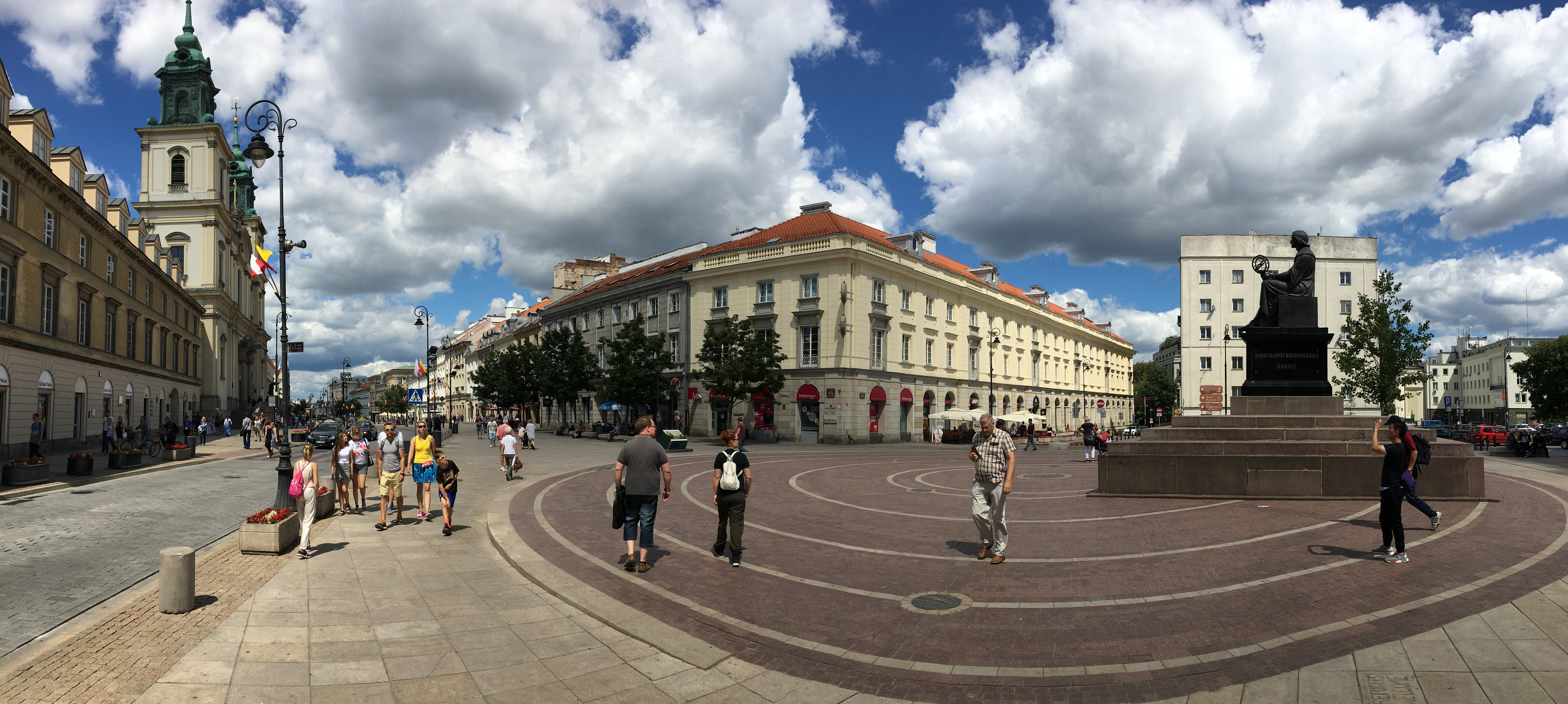
Panoramic view of the southern end of Krakowskie Przedmieście

== Gallery ==
=== Paintings by Canaletto ===
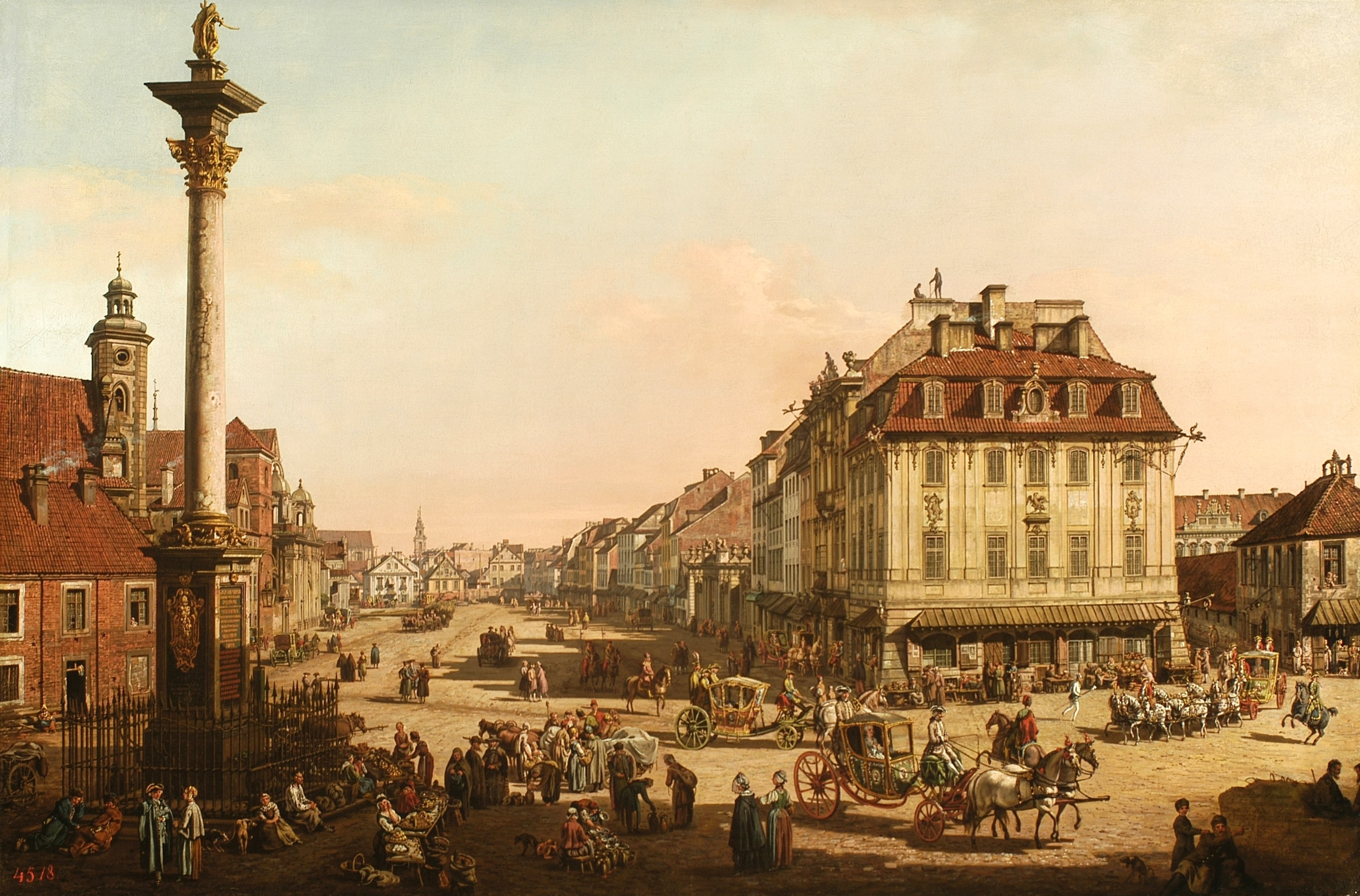
As seen from the Castle Square

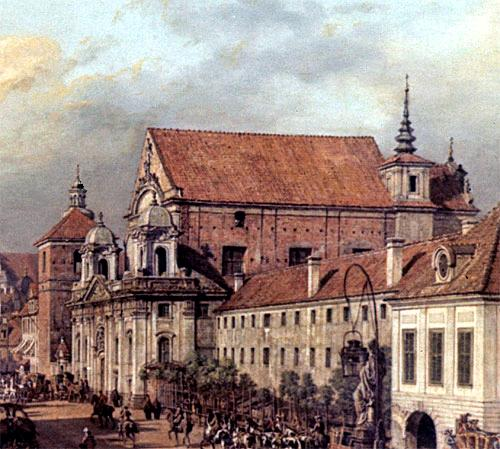
Detail with St. Anne's Church

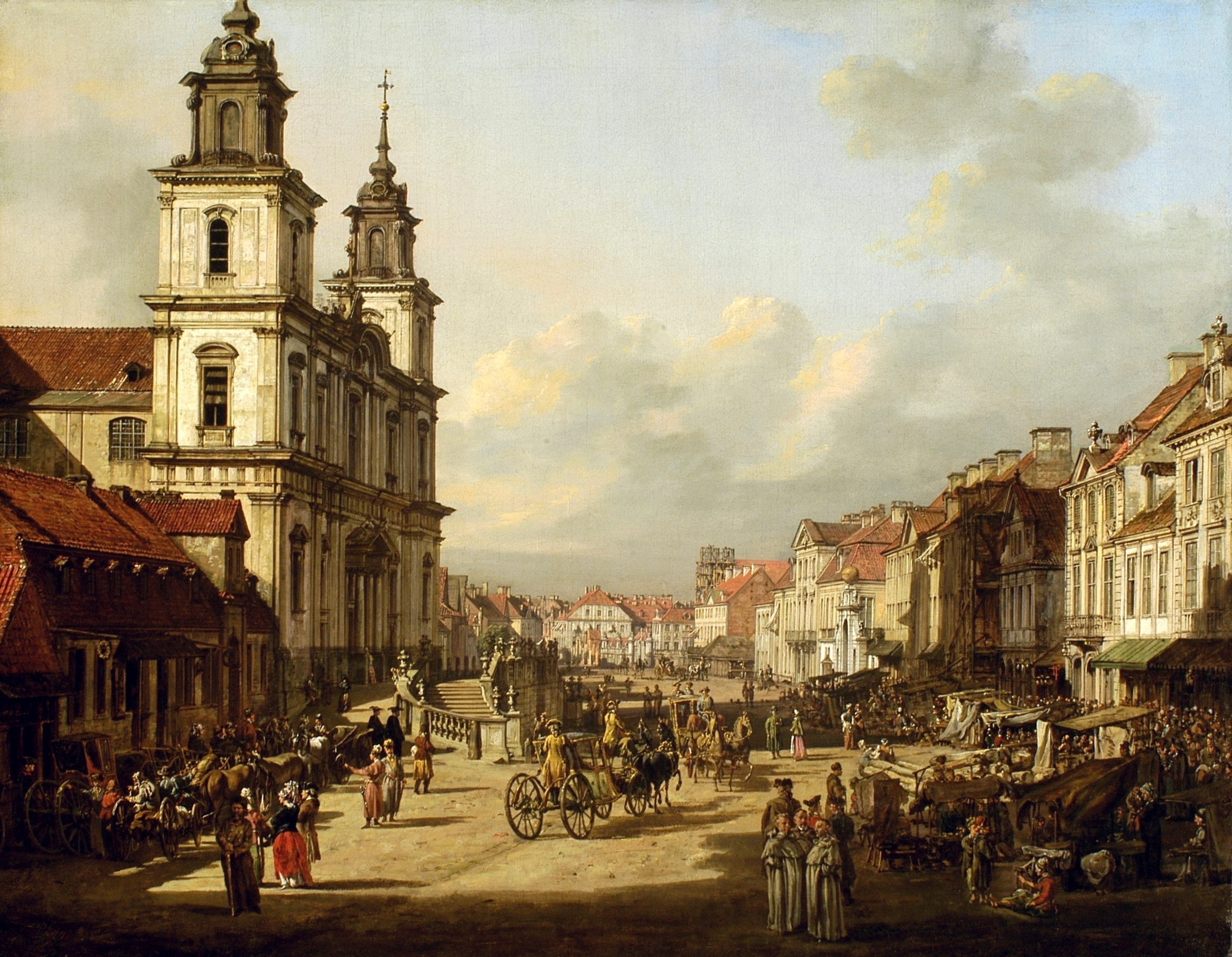
View from New WorldStreet

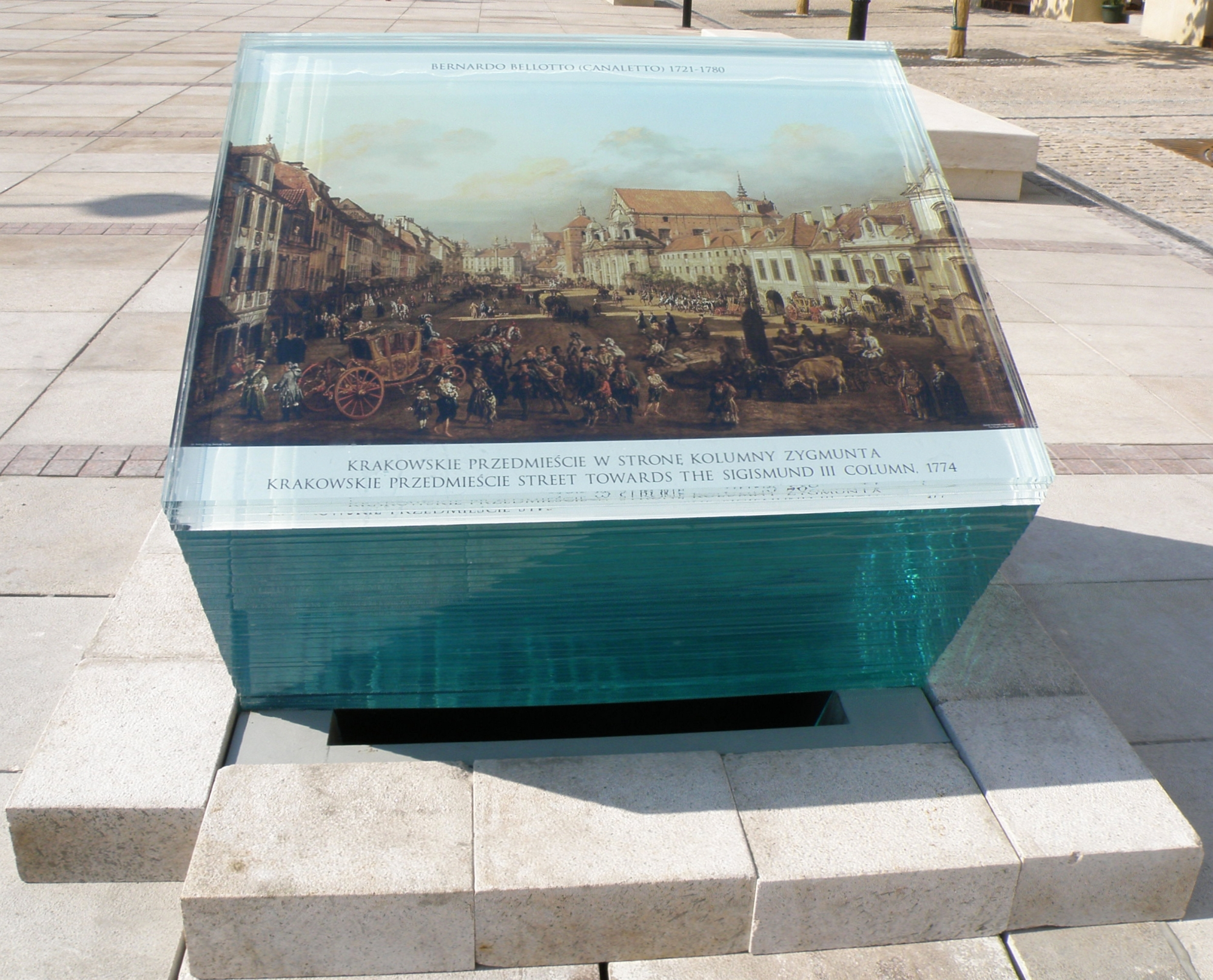
Canaletto painting display cube

=== Bronze monuments ===
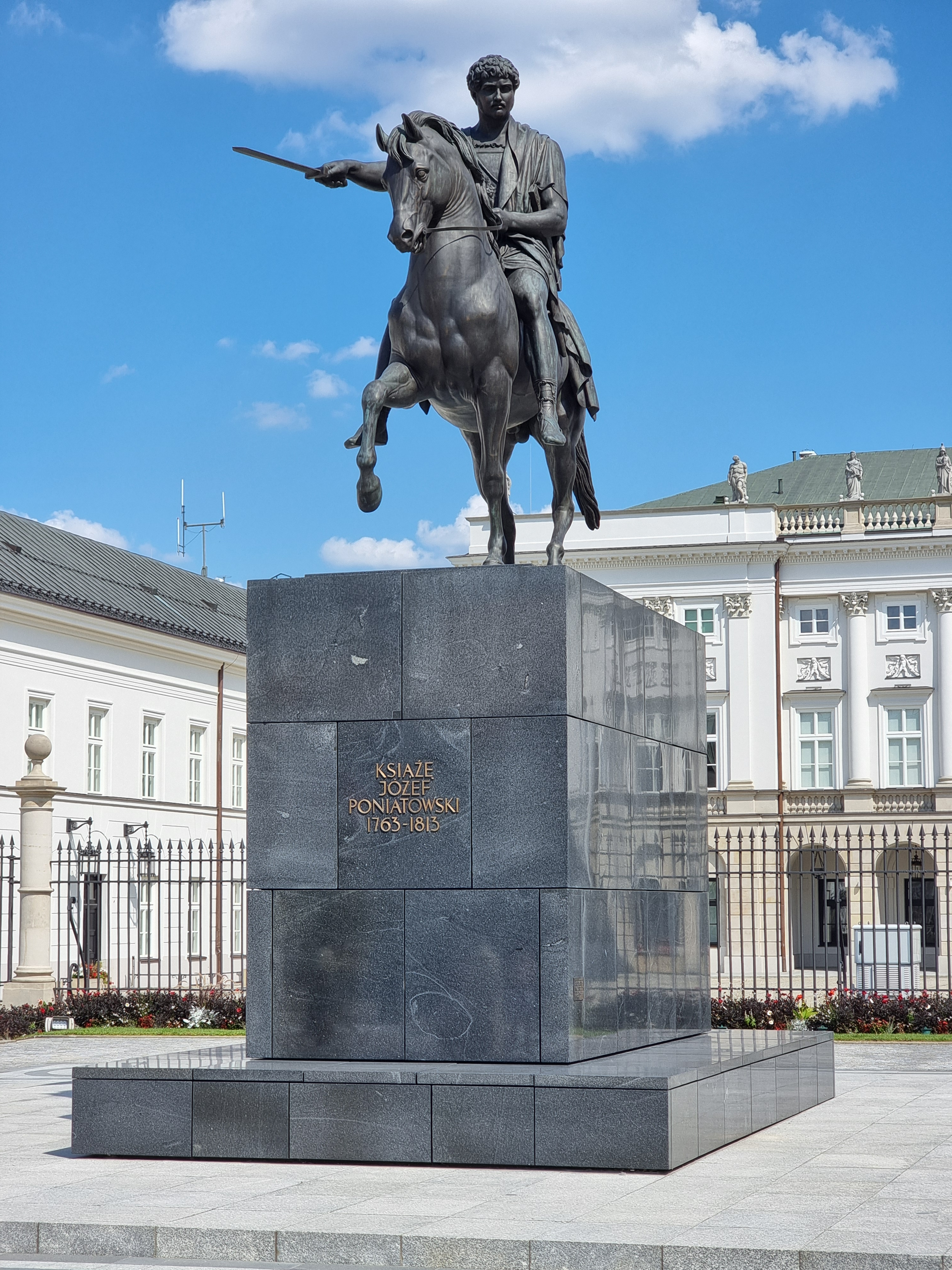
Józef Poniatowski Monument (1816)

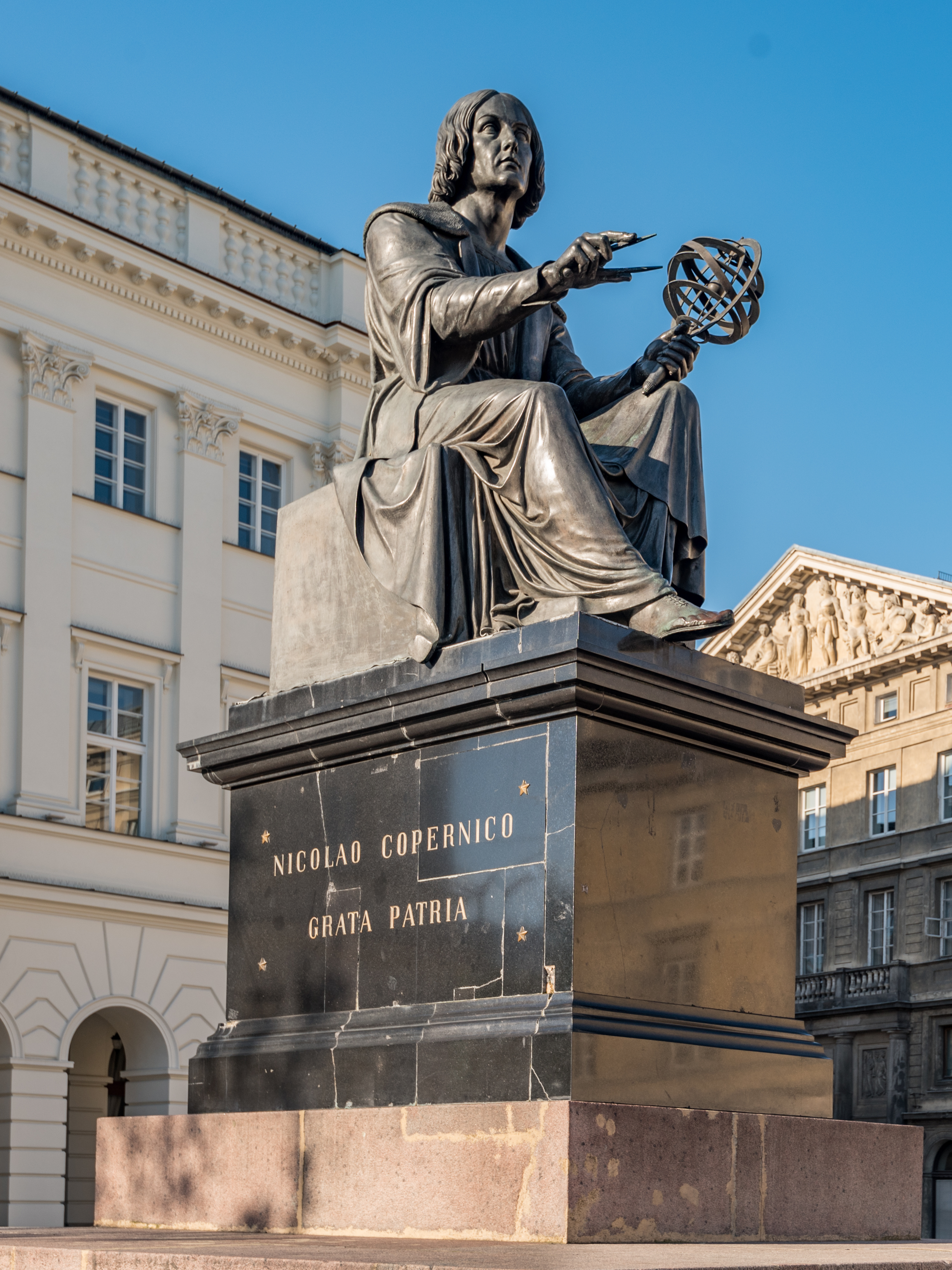
Nicolaus Copernicus Monument (1822)

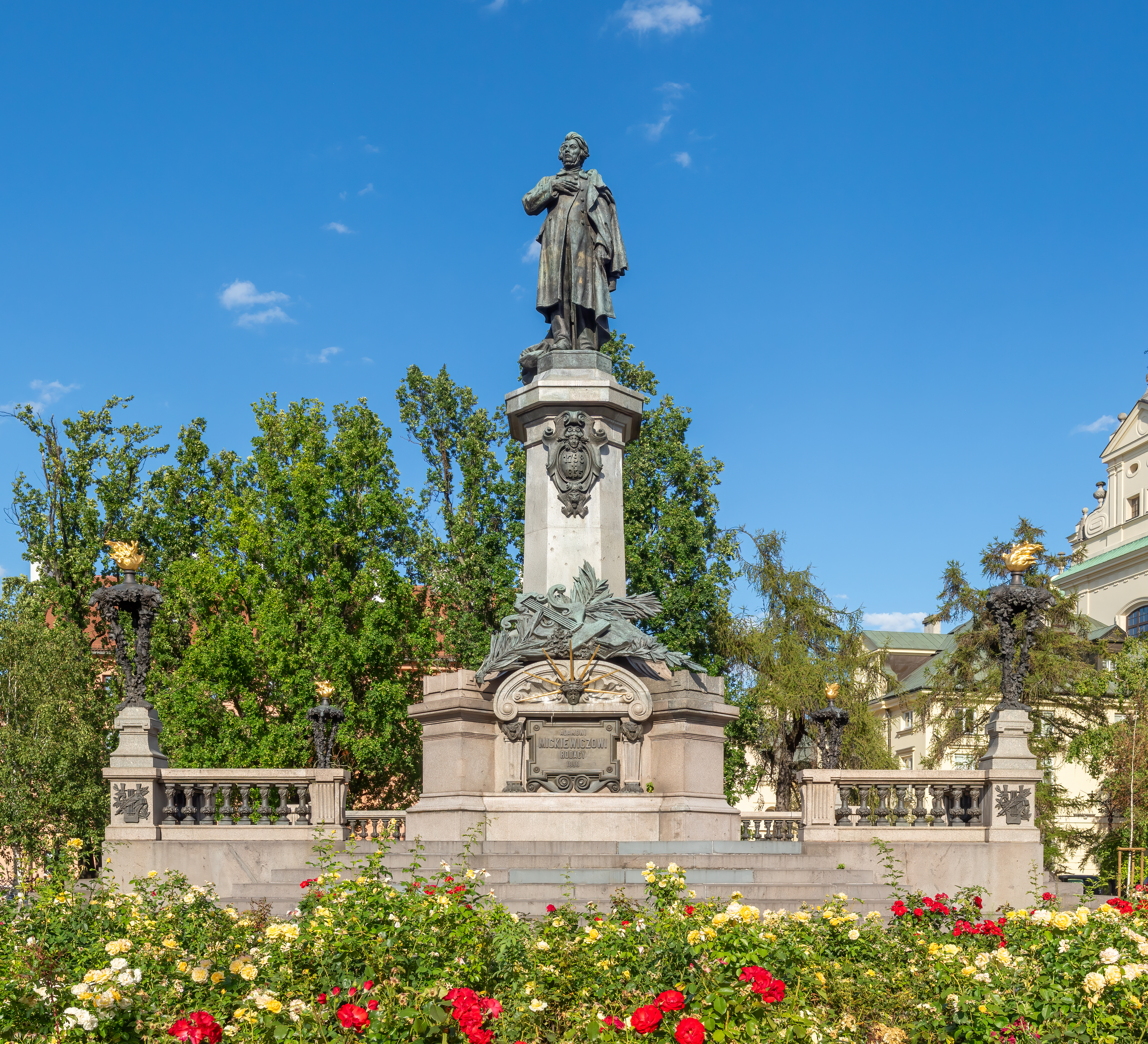
Adam Mickiewicz Monument (1898)
