= Tyszkiewicz Palace, Warsaw =

Coordinates: 52°14′26″N 21°01′02″E

Tyszkiewicz Palace
- Pałac Tyszkiewiczów
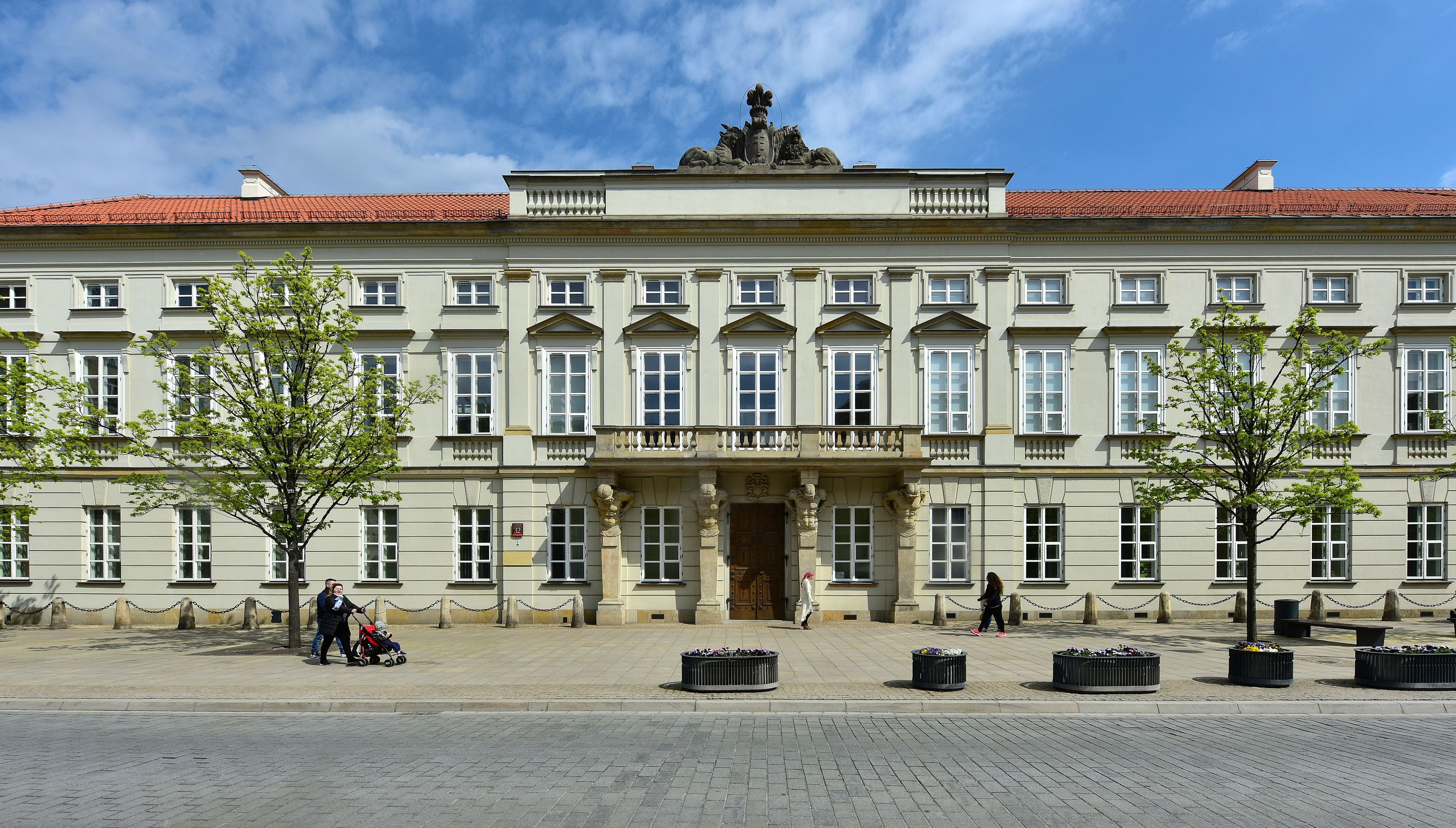
- Tyszkiewicz Palace, 2019
- Interactive map of the Tyszkiewicz Palace area

General information
- Architectural style: Neoclassical
- Location: Warsaw, Poland
- Construction started: 1785
- Completed: 1792
- Client: Ludwik Tyszkiewicz

Design and construction
- Architect: Jan Chrystian Kamsetzer

Other information
- Public transit: Nowy Świat-Uniwersytet

Historic Monument of Poland
- Designated: 1994-09-08
- Part of: Warsaw – historic city center with the Royal Route and Wilanów
- Reference no.: M.P. 1994 nr 50 poz. 423

Tyszkiewicz Palace (Polish: Pałac Tyszkiewiczów), also known as Tyszkiewicz–Potocki Palace, is a reconstructed palace at 32 Krakowskie Przedmieście in Warsaw, Poland. It is one of Warsaw's chief examples of the Neoclassical-style, featuring large statues of the Atlantes at the entrance.

== History ==
The original palace was built by Ludwik Tyszkiewicz, a Field Hetman of Lithuania. Construction began in 1785, initially to plans by Stanisław Zawadzki, and was finished in 1792 in the Neoclassical style, to a design by Jan Chrystian Kamsetzer. In 1840, the palace was bought by the Potocki family.

During the interwar period, the building was home to Bank Gospodarstwa Krajowego and later to the Polish Academy of Literature. Burned in 1944, the palace was rebuilt after World War II and is now a property of Warsaw University.

The palace's relatively modest west façade, on Krakowskie Przedmieście, is embellished with some fine stuccowork. The central balcony is supported by four elegant stone Atlantes carved in 1787 by André Le Brun.

== Gallery ==
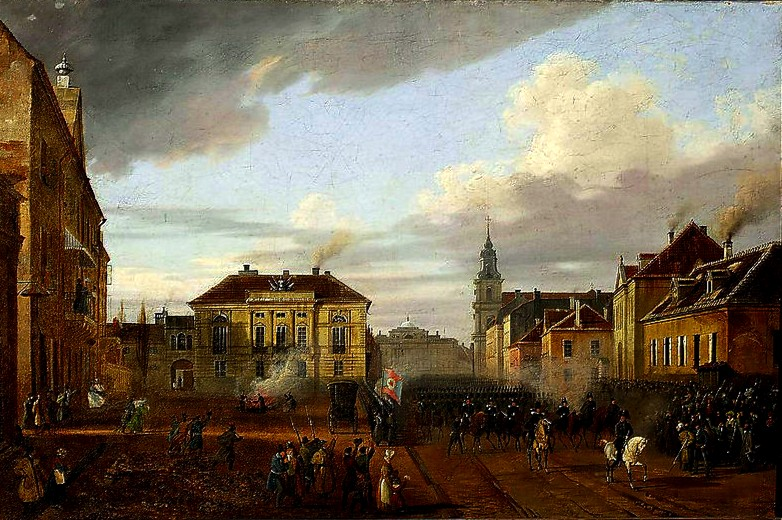
Tyszkiewicz Palace, north façade, 1830

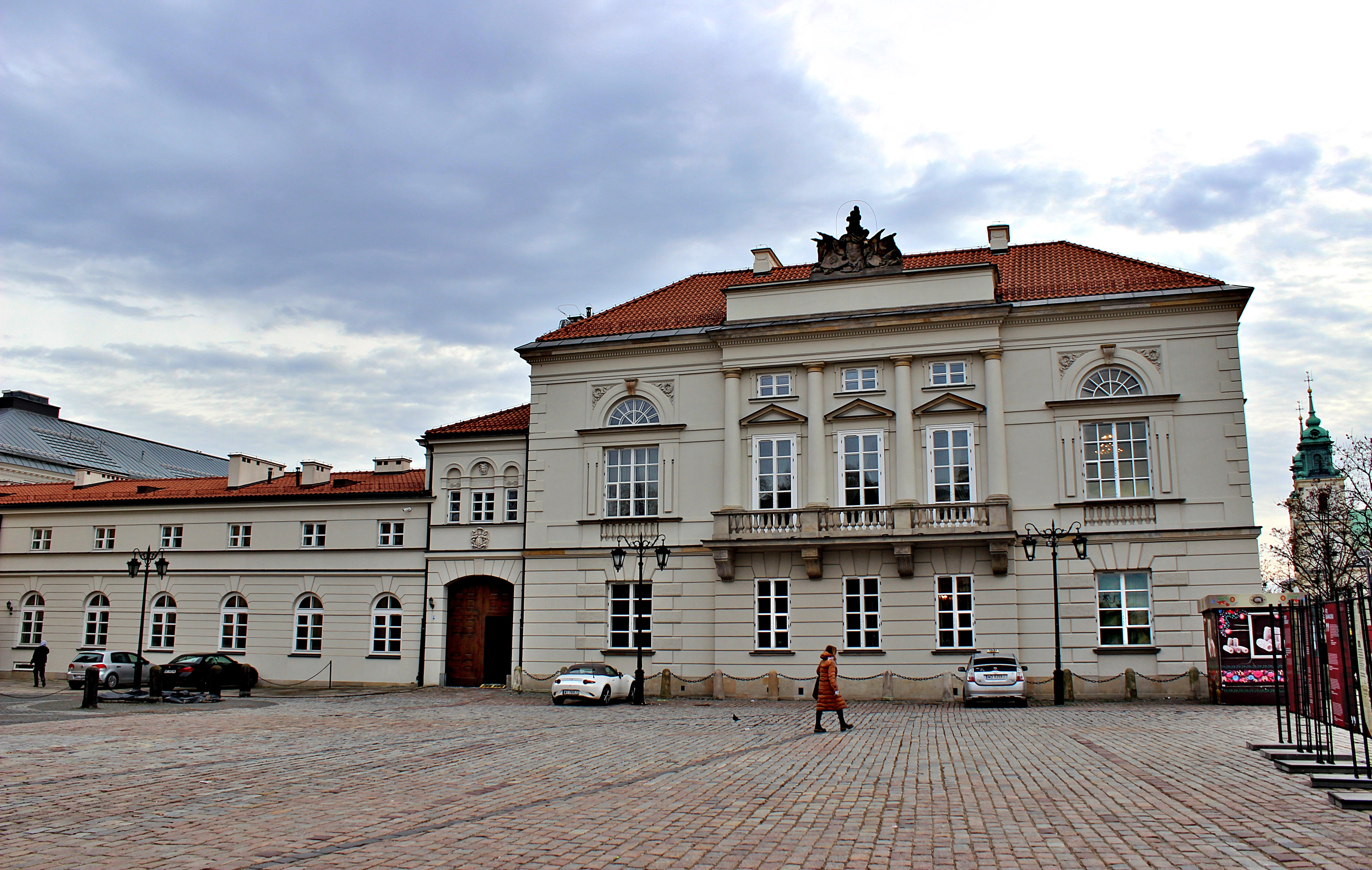
Northern façade
, 2023

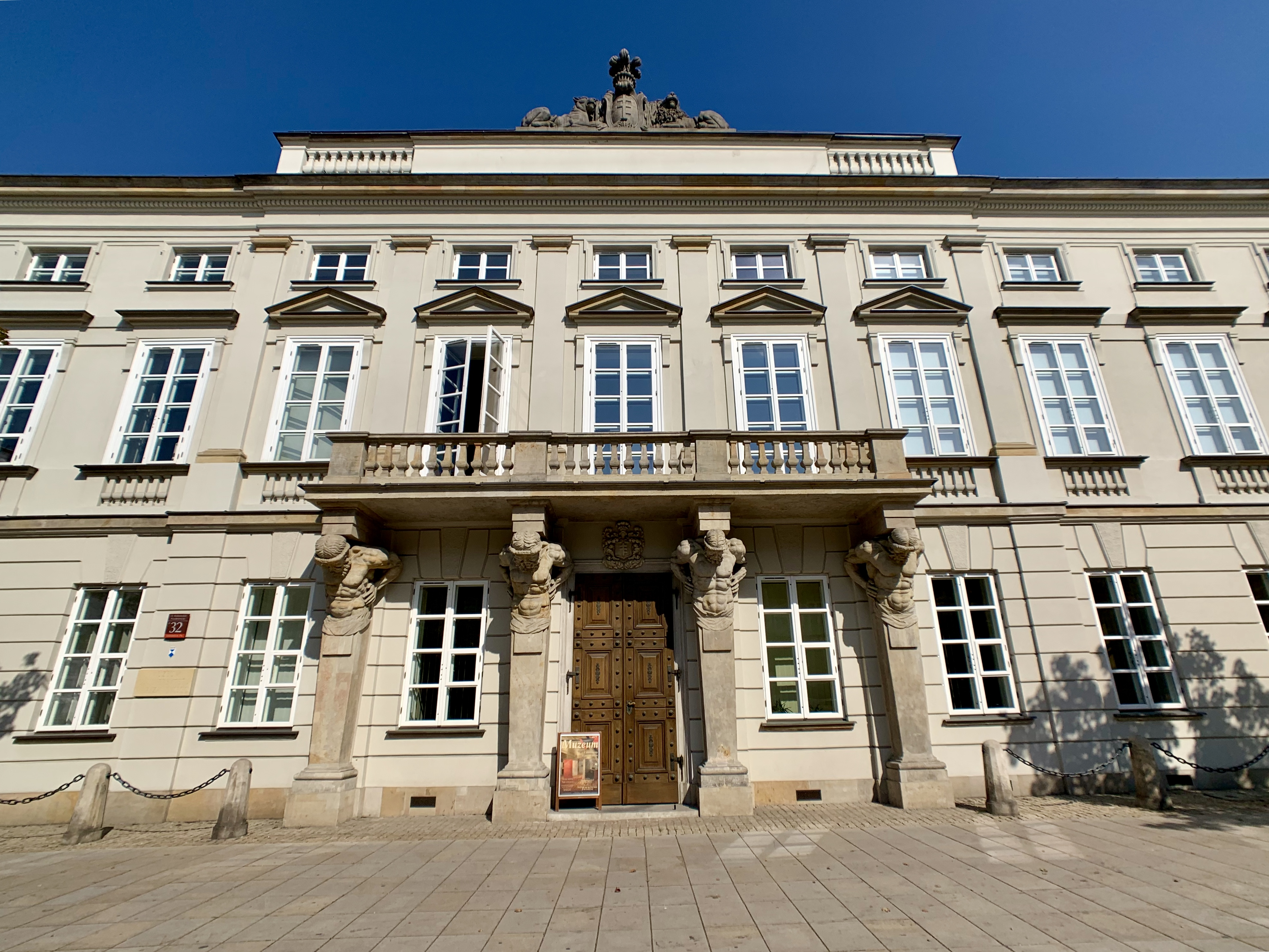
Western façade

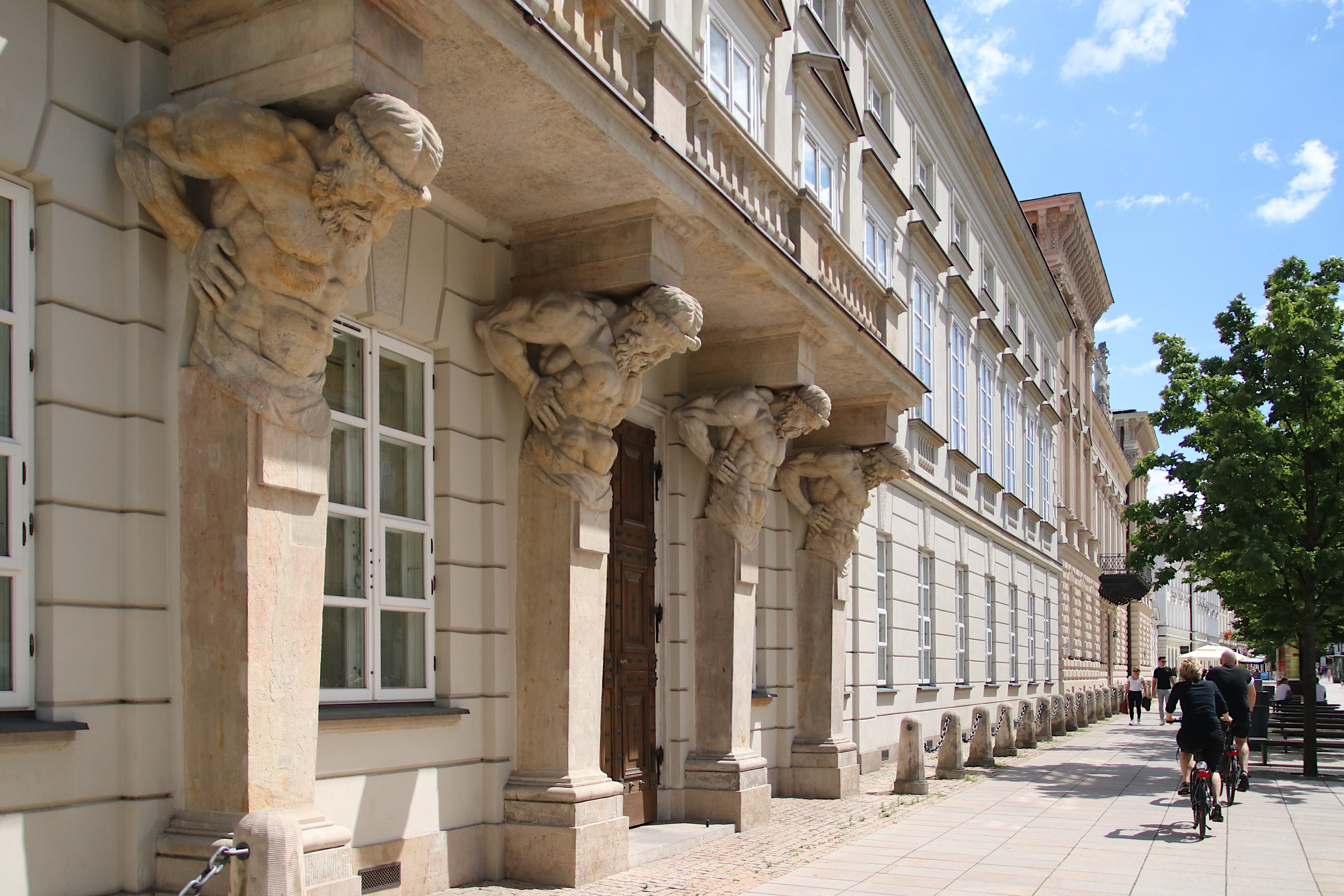
Atlantes at west entrance, on Krakowskie Przedmieście

== See also ==
- Holy Cross Church
- Presidential Palace
- Kazimierz Palace
