= Belweder =

Palace in Warsaw, Poland

Coordinates: 52°12′47″N 21°01′40″E

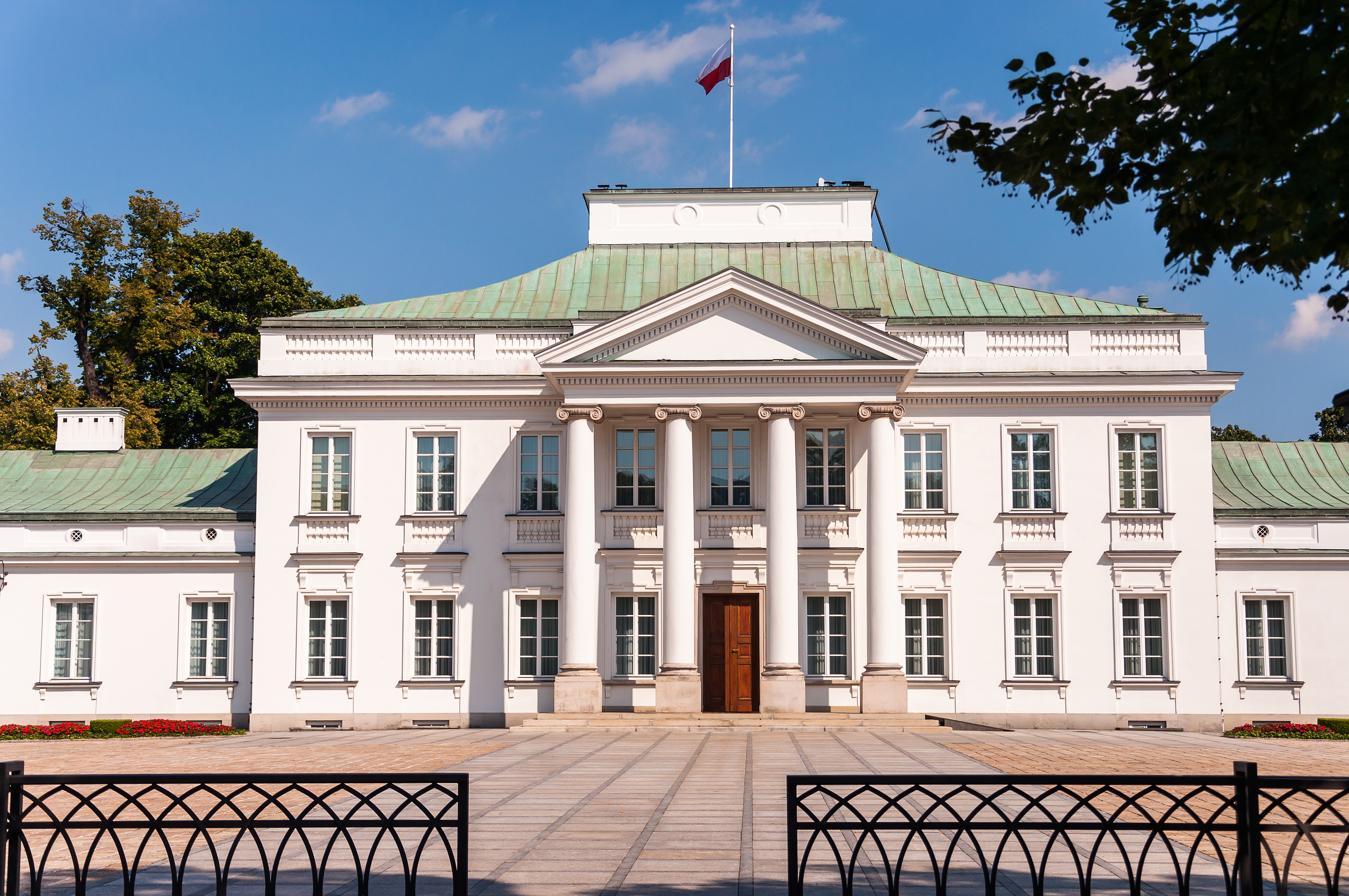
- Belweder Palace (view from ulica Belwederska).
- Interactive map of the Belweder area

General information
- Architectural style: Neoclassical, Palladian
- Construction started: 1660
- Completed: 1819–1822
- Client: Krzysztof Zygmunt Pac, Stanisław August Poniatowski, Grand Duke Constantine, Józef Piłsudski, Bolesław Bierut Wojciech Jaruzelski, Lech Wałęsa, Bronisław Komorowski Karol Nawrocki

Historic Monument of Poland
- Designated: 1994-09-08
- Part of: Warsaw – historic city center with the Royal Route and Wilanów
- Reference no.: M.P. 1994 nr 50 poz. 423

Belweder (Polish pronunciation: [bɛlˈvɛdɛr]; from the Italian belvedere, "beautiful view") is a neoclassical palace in Warsaw, Poland. Erected in 1660 and remodelled in the early 1800s, it is one of several official residences used by Polish presidents as well as a state guest house for visiting heads of state. The complex is situated south of Warsaw's city center, in the vicinity of the historic Royal Baths Park (Łazienki).

== History ==
The present building is the latest of several that stood on the site since 1660. Belweder once belonged to Poland's last king, Stanislaus Augustus, who used it as a porcelain-manufacturing plant. From 1818 it was the residence of Grand Duke Constantine Pavlovich, who de facto acted as viceroy in the Congress Kingdom of Poland. He fled from Belweder at the beginning of the November 1830 Uprising.

After the re-establishment of Poland's independence following the First World War in 1918, the Belweder served as the residence of Marshal Józef Piłsudski, Chief of State (1918–1922) and later (1926–1935) Minister of Military Affairs of Poland. Intermittently, it was also the residence of President Stanisław Wojciechowski. After the May 1926 coup d'état, the ownership of the complex had passed from Wojciechowski to Piłsudski, who died there in 1935.

During World War II, the building was extensively remodelled for Hans Frank, Governor of Nazi-occupied Poland and the so-called General Government. It remains one of the few original structures in Warsaw to survive the war.

In 1945–1952 it was the residence of Bolesław Bierut, and later of the president of the Council of State.

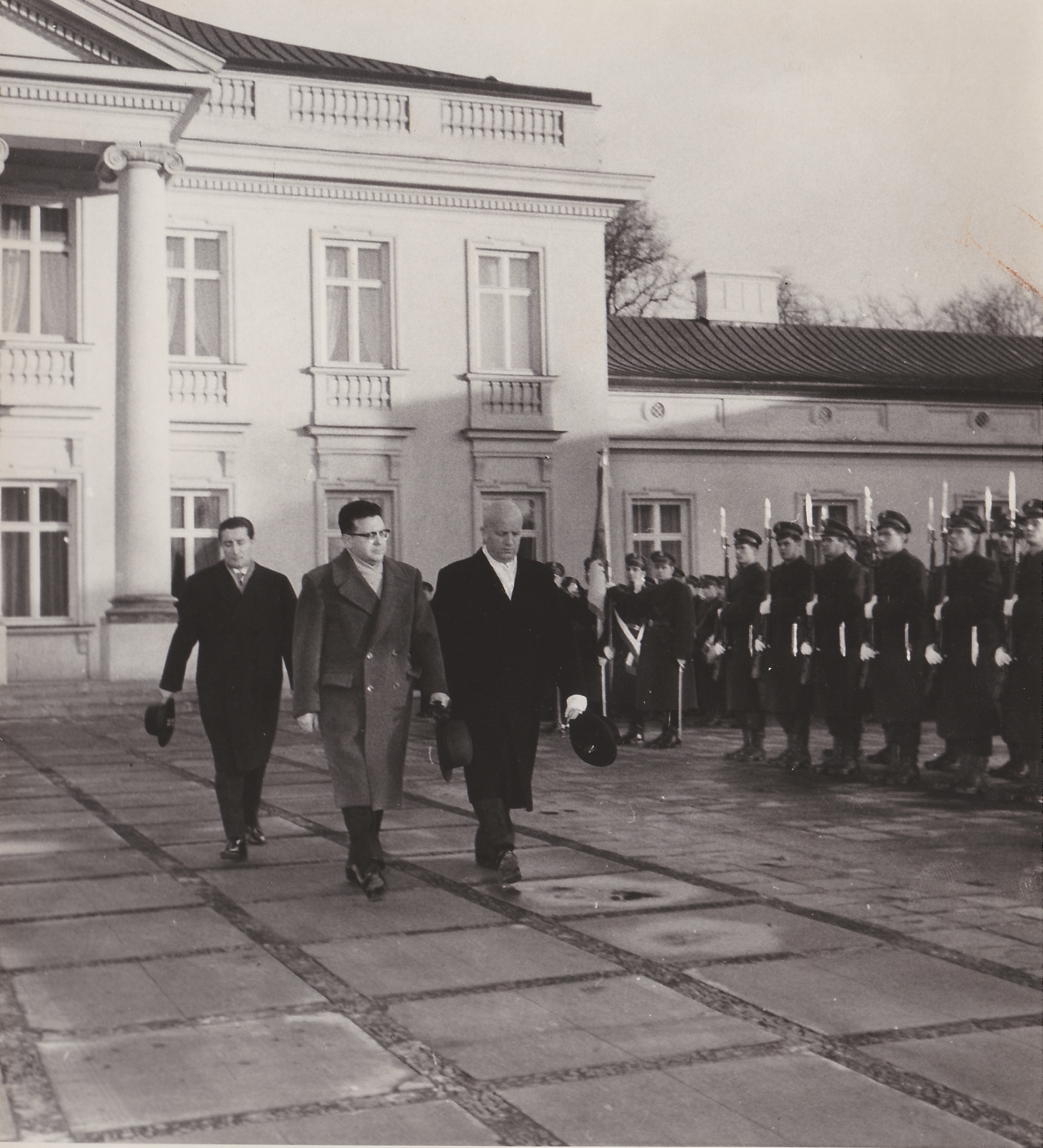
Belweder Palace in 1960 hosting Tunisia’s first ambassador to Poland Ahmed Mestiri.

From 1989 to July 1994, it was the official residence of Poland's presidents (Wojciech Jaruzelski and Lech Wałęsa), but proved too small for that purpose. Later on president Bronisław Komorowski used it as his private residence.

Belweder is normally used by the president and the government for ceremonial purposes, while the president resides at the "Presidential Palace" in the city center. It also serves as an official residence for heads of state on official visits to Poland and other important guests. There have been plans to turn the Belweder Palace into a museum dedicated to Józef Piłsudski. Currently it houses a small exhibition devoted to the Marshal.

== Popular culture ==
Belvedere Vodka, owned by LVMH, is named after the palace and an image of the building is featured on the bottle label.

== Gallery ==
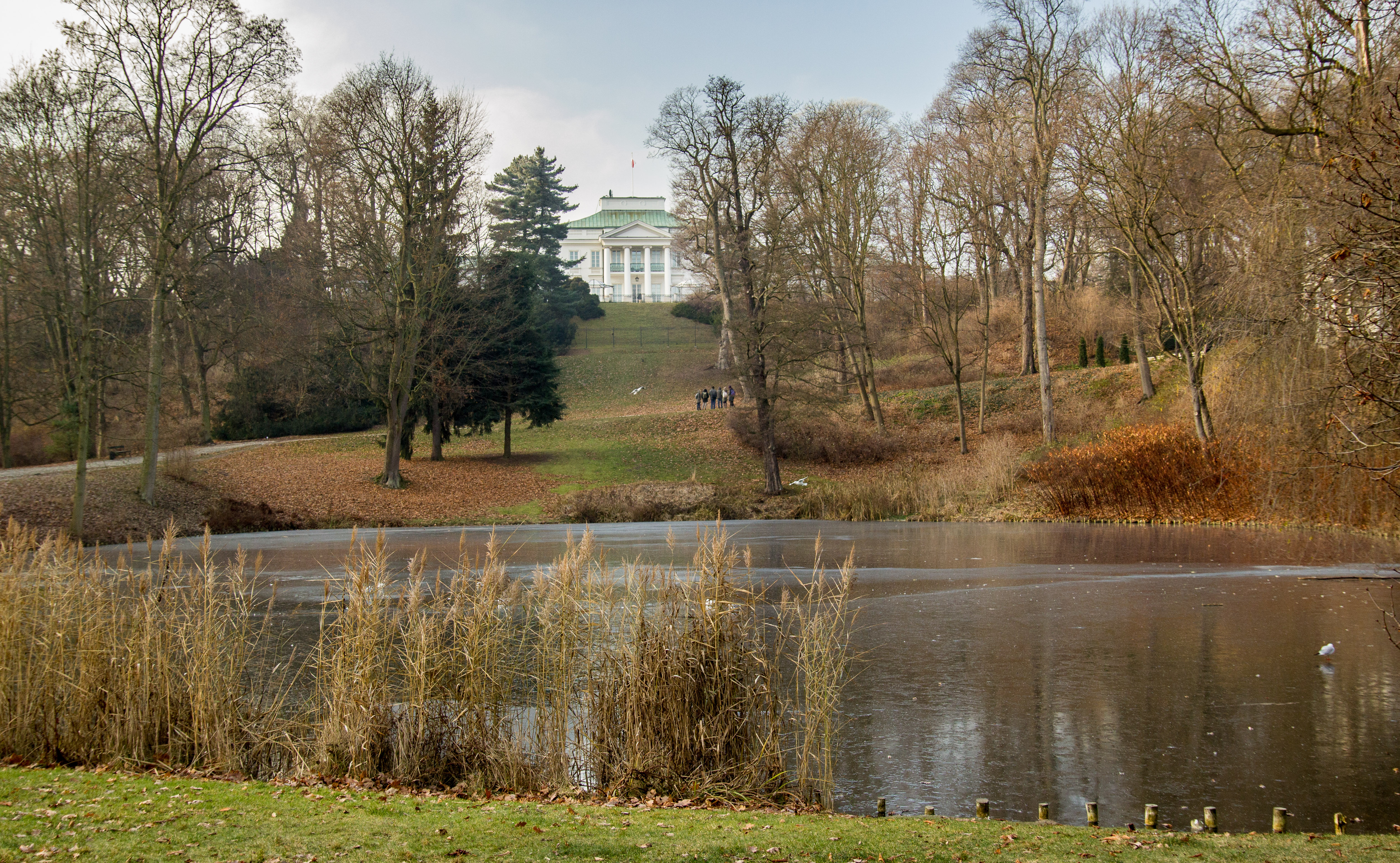
Garden façade of the palace

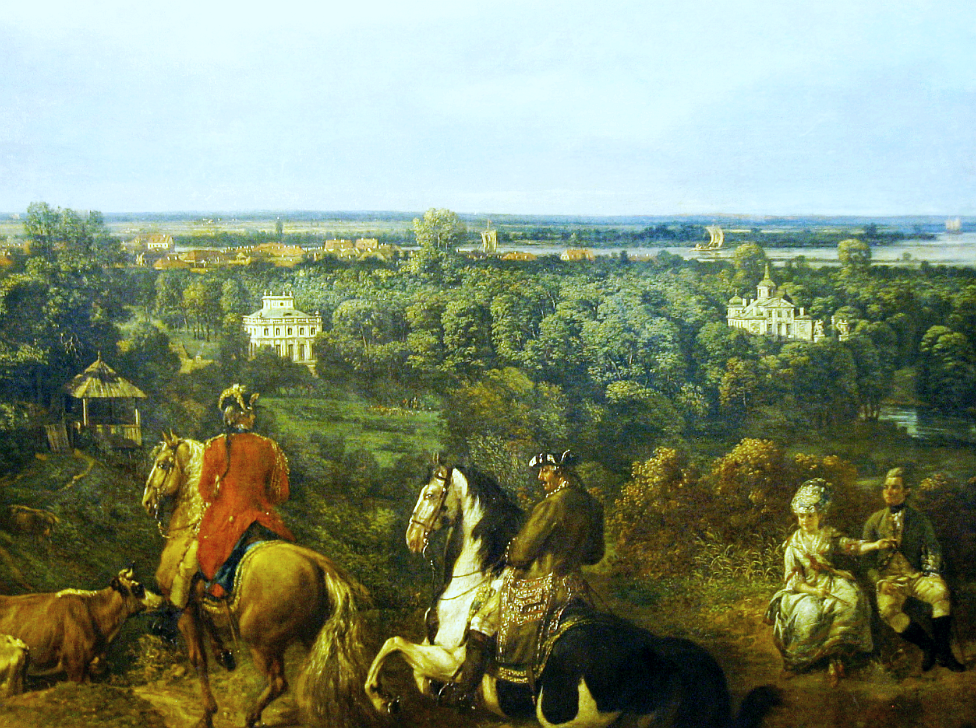
Łazienki Park in 1775 by Bernardo Bellotto

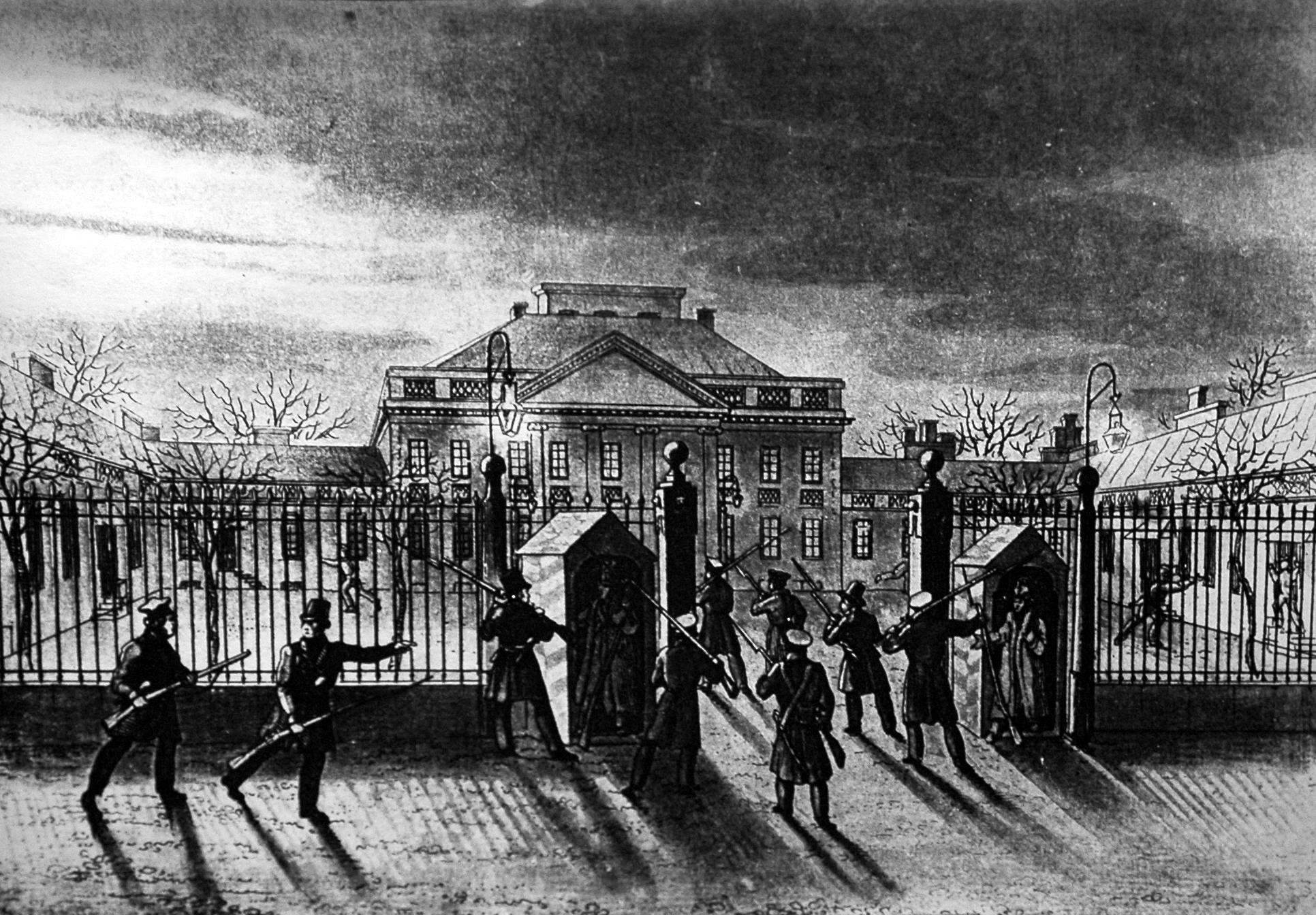
Storming of the Belweder Palace during the November Uprising

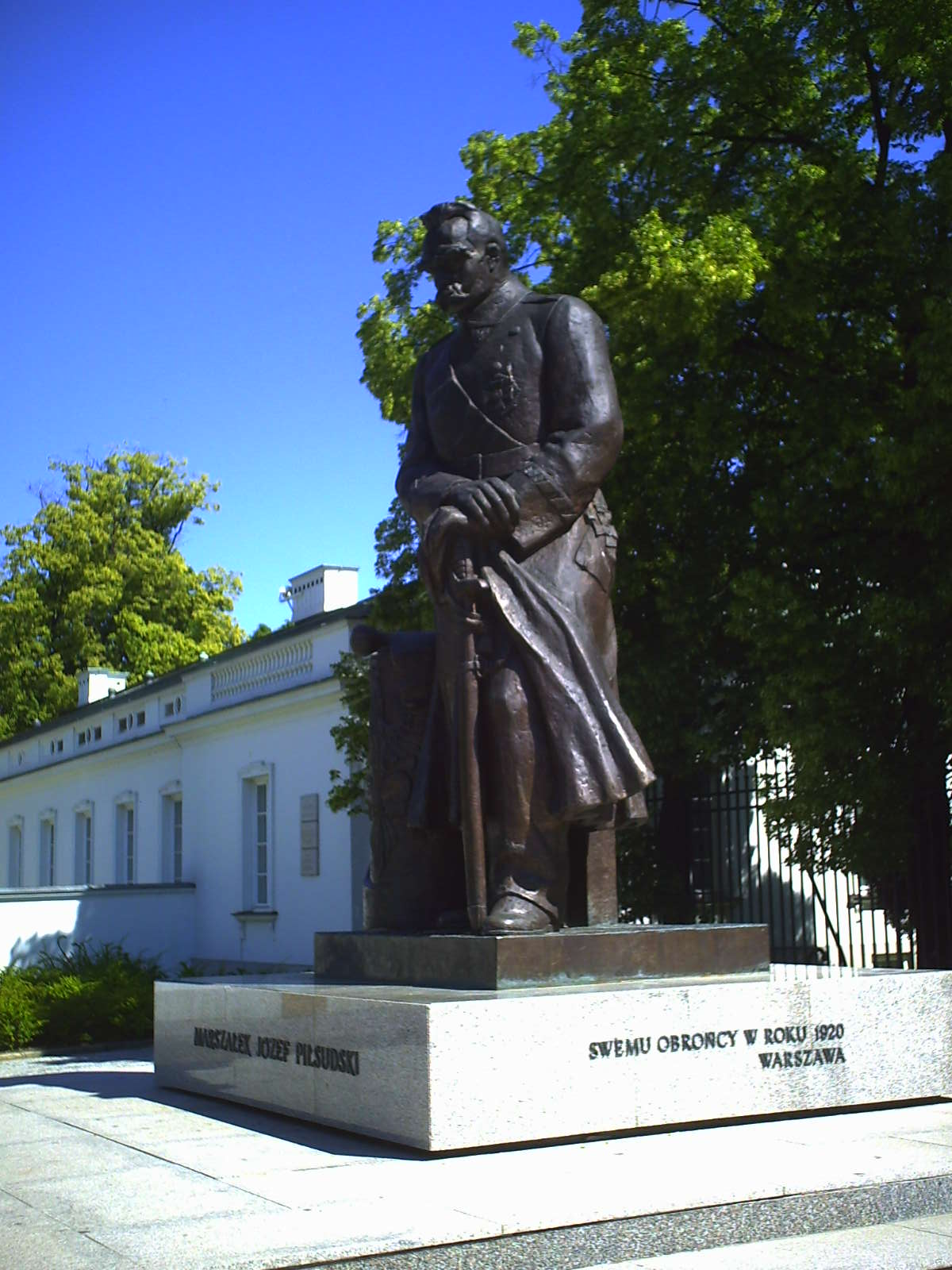
Statue of Józef Piłsudski in front of the Belweder, Piłsudski's residence

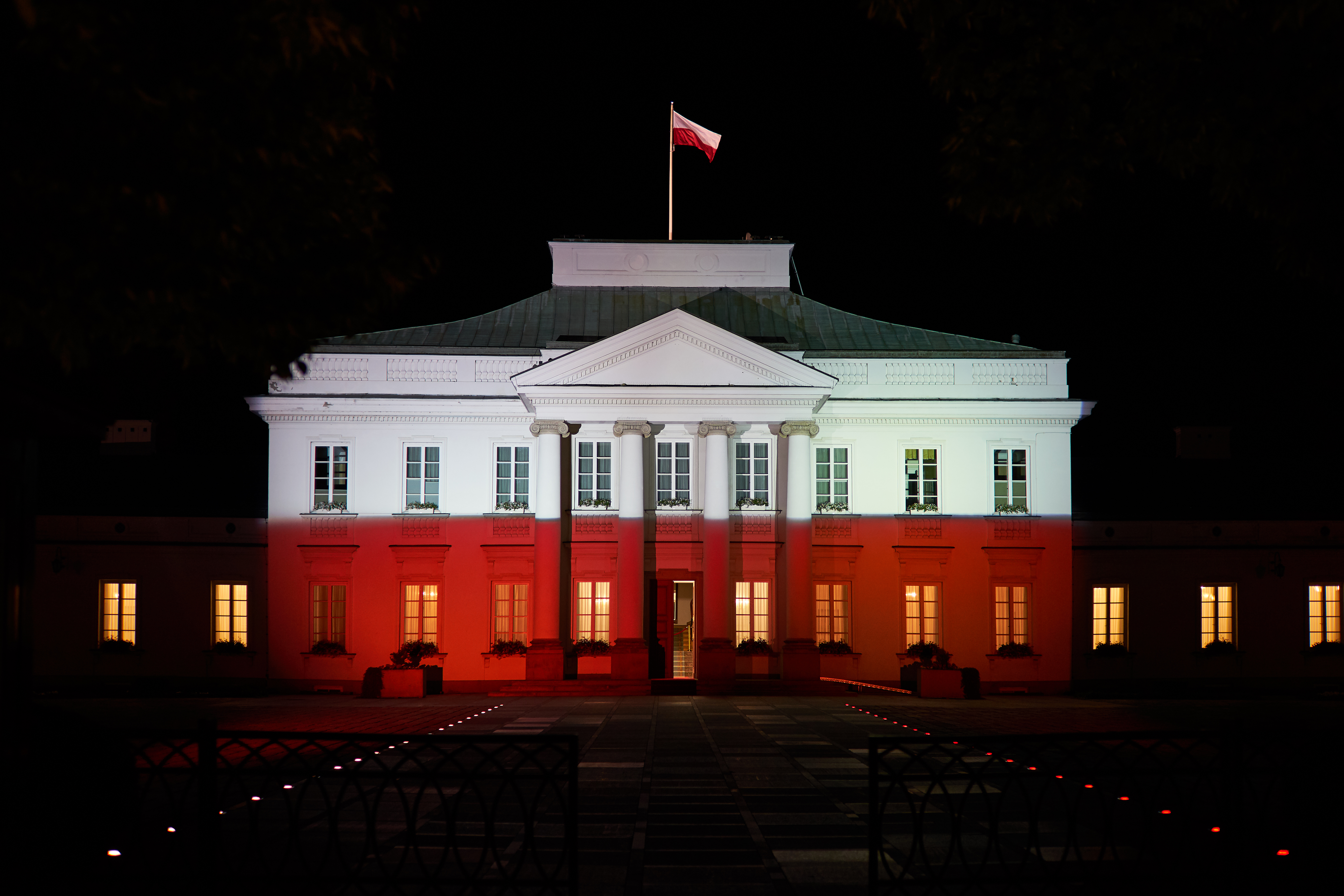
Night illumination in the colour of the Polish flag, 2018

== See also ==
- Polish classicism
- Presidential Palace
- Royal Route
- List of palaces in Poland
