= Carmelite Church, Warsaw =

Church building in Warsaw, Poland

Coordinates: 52°14′36″N 21°00′56″E

Carmelite Church Kościół Wniebowzięcia NMP i Św. Józefa Oblubieńca (in Polish)
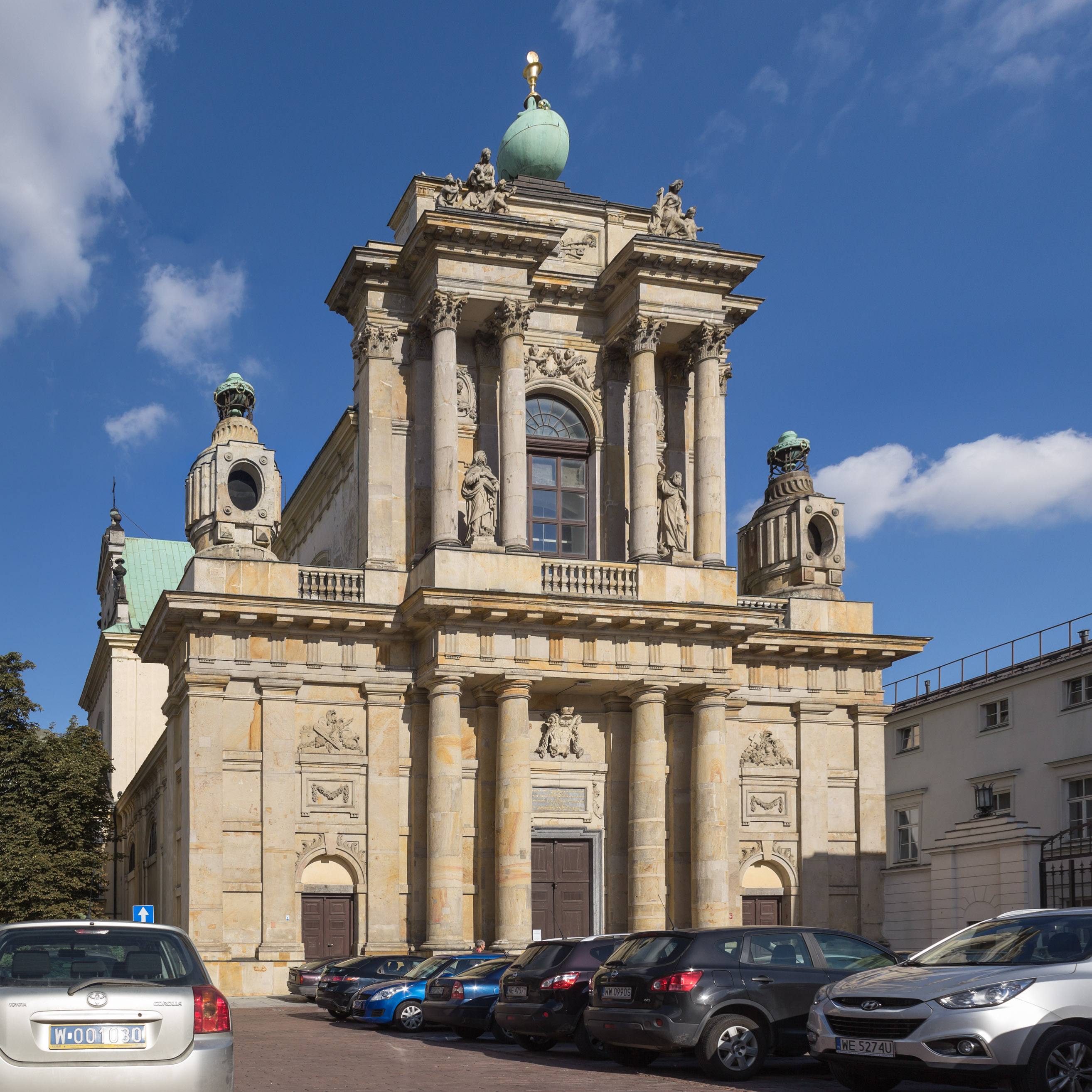
- Church of the Assumption of the Virgin Mary and of St. Joseph.
- Interactive map of the Carmelite Church; Kościół Wniebowzięcia NMP i Św. Józefa Oblubieńca (in Polish) area

General information
- Architectural style: Baroque (façade Neoclassical, 1761-83)
- Location: Warsaw, Poland
- Construction started: 1661
- Completed: 1681
- Client: Michał Stefan Radziejowski

Design and construction
- Architects: Jan Szymon Belotti, Efraim Szreger (façade)

Historic Monument of Poland
- Designated: 1994-09-08
- Part of: Warsaw – historic city center with the Royal Route and Wilanów
- Reference no.: M.P. 1994 nr 50 poz. 423

Church of the Assumption of the Virgin Mary and of St. Joseph (Polish: Kościół Wniebowzięcia NMP i św. Józefa Oblubieńca), commonly known as the Carmelite Church (Polish: Kościół Karmelitów), is a Roman Catholic church at Krakowskie Przedmieście 52/54 in Warsaw, Poland.

The Carmelite Church has Warsaw's most notable neoclassical-style façade, created in 1761–83. The church assumed its present appearance beginning in the 17th century and is best known for its twin belfries shaped like censers.

== History ==
The present church is the second building to have arisen here, erected over the site of a wooden church originally constructed for the Discalced Carmelite Order in 1643 and burned down by the Swedes and Brandenburg Germans in the 1650s.

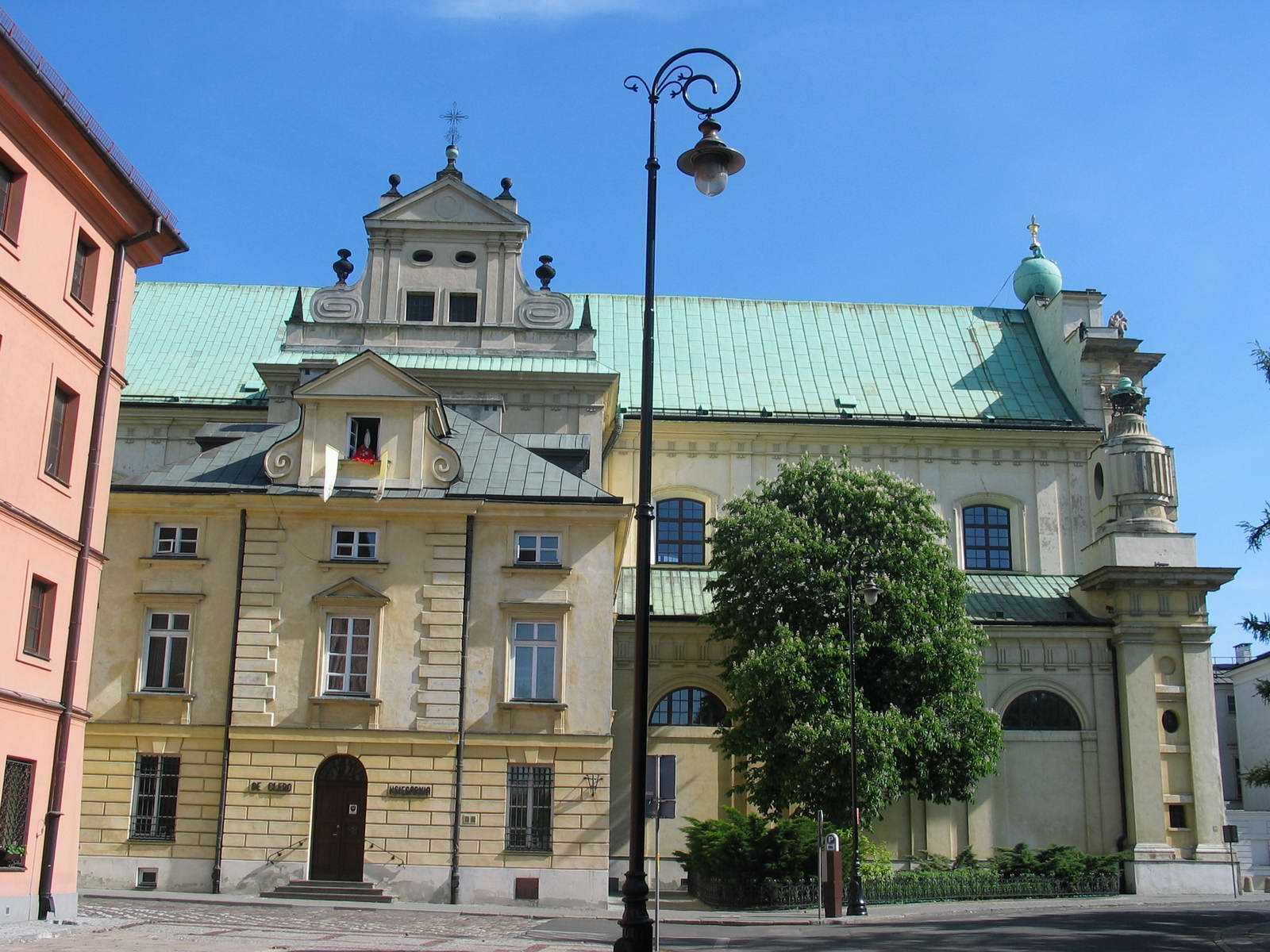
View from northwest, showing remnants of the original Polish-baroque architecture

The new building was founded in 1661 by Polish Primate Michał Stefan Radziejowski, who also established Warsaw's Holy Cross Church. It was built in 1692–1701 to the plan of Józef Szymon Bellotti.

The church's basic structure had been largely completed by the end of the 17th century, but the present façade was not begun till 1761. It was erected by Prince Karol Stanisław Radziwiłł, who commissioned the German architect Efraim Szreger to draw up a plan for a comprehensive new façade. This impressive façade was built in a style typical for the reign of King Stanisław II Augustus, with dominant columns supporting the cornice.

The distinguished 18th-century artist Szymon Czechowicz embellished the church with his paintings. Another leading Polish painter, Franciszek Smuglewicz, created altar paintings. The interior is opulent, with magnificent rococo main altar, gilding and stucco ceiling decorations.

The Carmelite Church was the site of Frédéric Chopin's first employment. He was invited to give a recital on the church's organ.

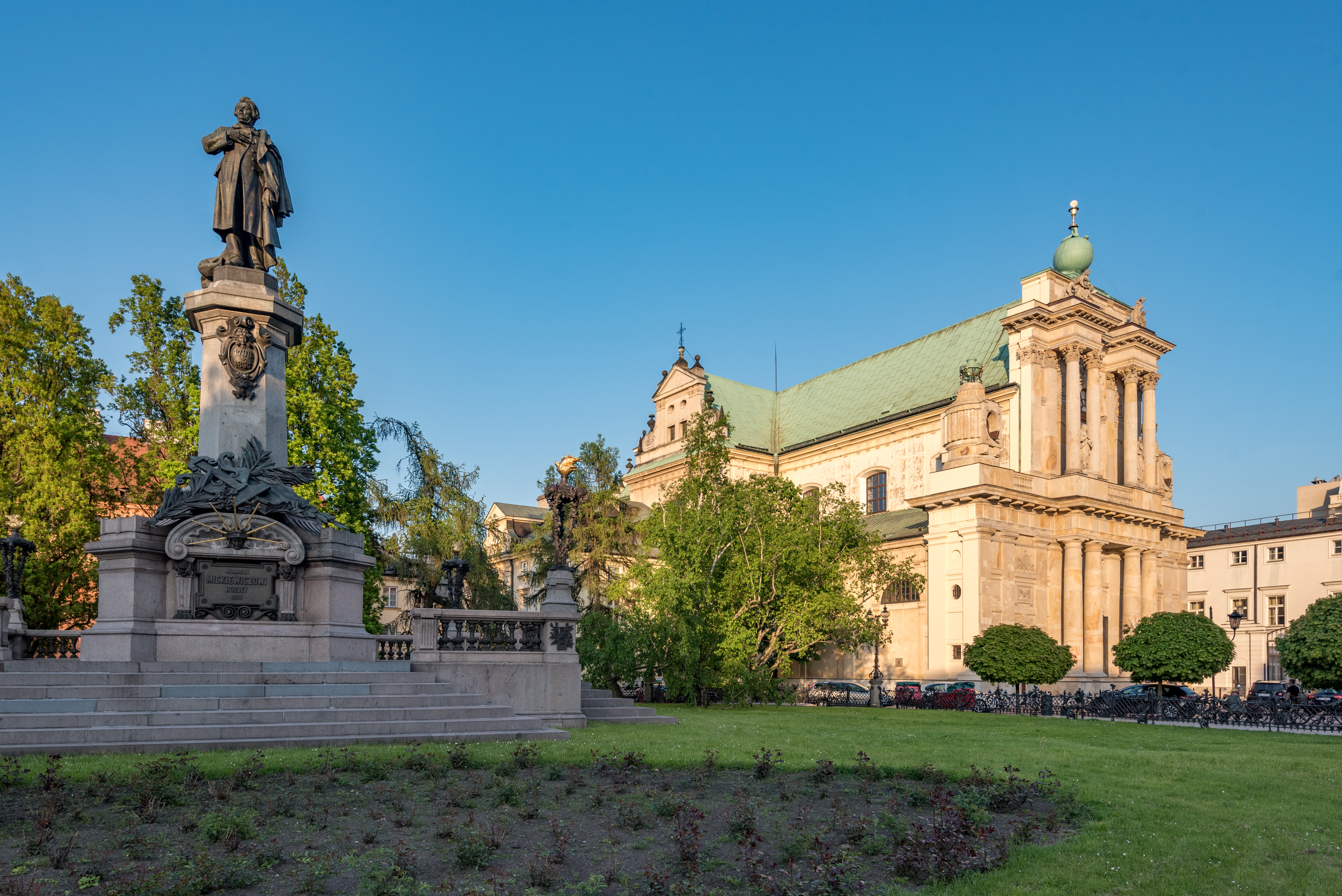
Former Carmelite Church and monument to Adam Mickiewicz

In 1864, after the January Uprising was brutally crushed by Russians, the monastery was liquidated by the Tsarist regime as a stronghold of Polish patriotism. The buildings have been since adapted for the Warsaw Archdiocesan Seminary and the former Carmelite Church serves as the seminary church.

The church was the background for the song "Siekera, Motyka", in the Polish Movie, "Forbidden Melodies"

It served as a procathedral until the reconstruction of St. John's Cathedral.

== See also ==
- Presidential Palace
- St. Anne's Church
- St. Florian's Cathedral
