= St. Anne's Church, Warsaw =

Coordinates: 52°14′47″N 21°0′51″E

St. Anne's Collegiate Church
- Kościół kolegiacki św. Anny
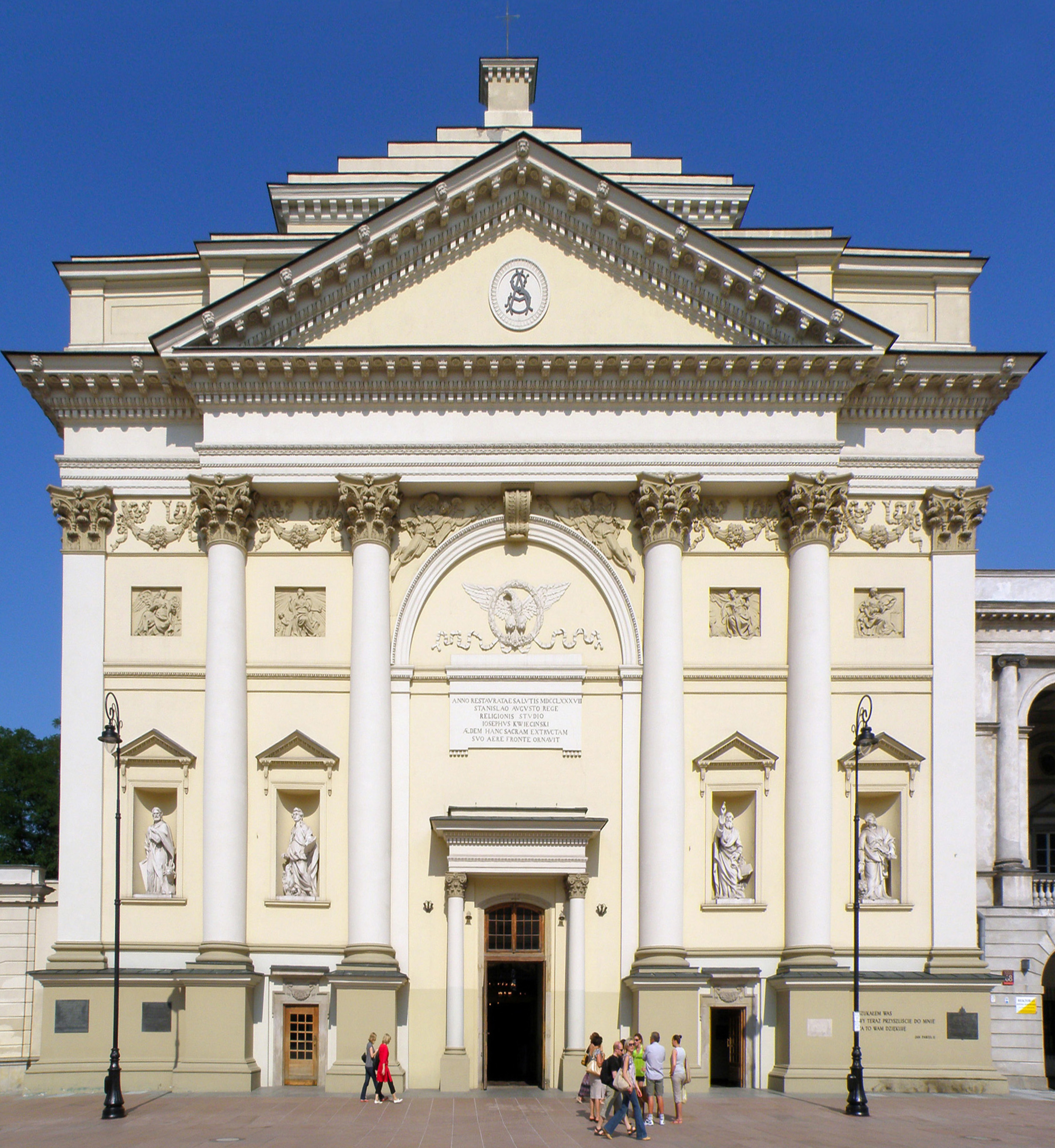
- Façade with statues of the Four Evangelists.
- St. Anne's Collegiate Church
- Country: Poland
- Denomination: Catholic

Architecture
- Functional status: Active
- Architect: Chrystian Piotr Aigner (1788)
- Style: Neoclassical (façade)
- Groundbreaking: 1454

Administration
- Archdiocese: Warsaw

UNESCO World Heritage Site
- Type: Cultural
- Criteria: ii, vi
- Designated: 1980
- Part of: Historic Centre of Warsaw
- Reference no.: 30bis

Historic Monument of Poland
- Designated: 1994-09-08
- Part of: Warsaw – historic city center with the Royal Route and Wilanów
- Reference no.: M.P. 1994 nr 50 poz. 423

St. Anne's Collegiate Church (Polish: Kościół kolegiacki św. Anny) is a Roman Catholic church in the historic center of Warsaw, Poland, adjacent to the Castle Square, at Krakowskie Przedmieście 68. It is one of Poland's most notable churches with a Neoclassical facade. The church ranks among Warsaw's oldest buildings. Over time, it has seen many reconstructions, resulting in its present-day appearance, unchanged since 1788. Currently it is the main church parish of the academic community in Warsaw.

== History ==
In 1454 Duchess of Masovia Anna Fiodorowna (wife of Bolesław Januszowic, in some old books mistakenly called Holszanska), coming from a Ruthenized Lithuanian princely house, founded this church with a cloister for the Bernardine friars (Order of Friars Minor).

The square in front of the church was a place of solemn homages to Polish monarchs by the rulers of Prussia (the first one in 1578, the last one in 1621). In 1582 a slender tower was added to the church. Some time later it was encompassed with a rampart and incorporated into the city fortifications.

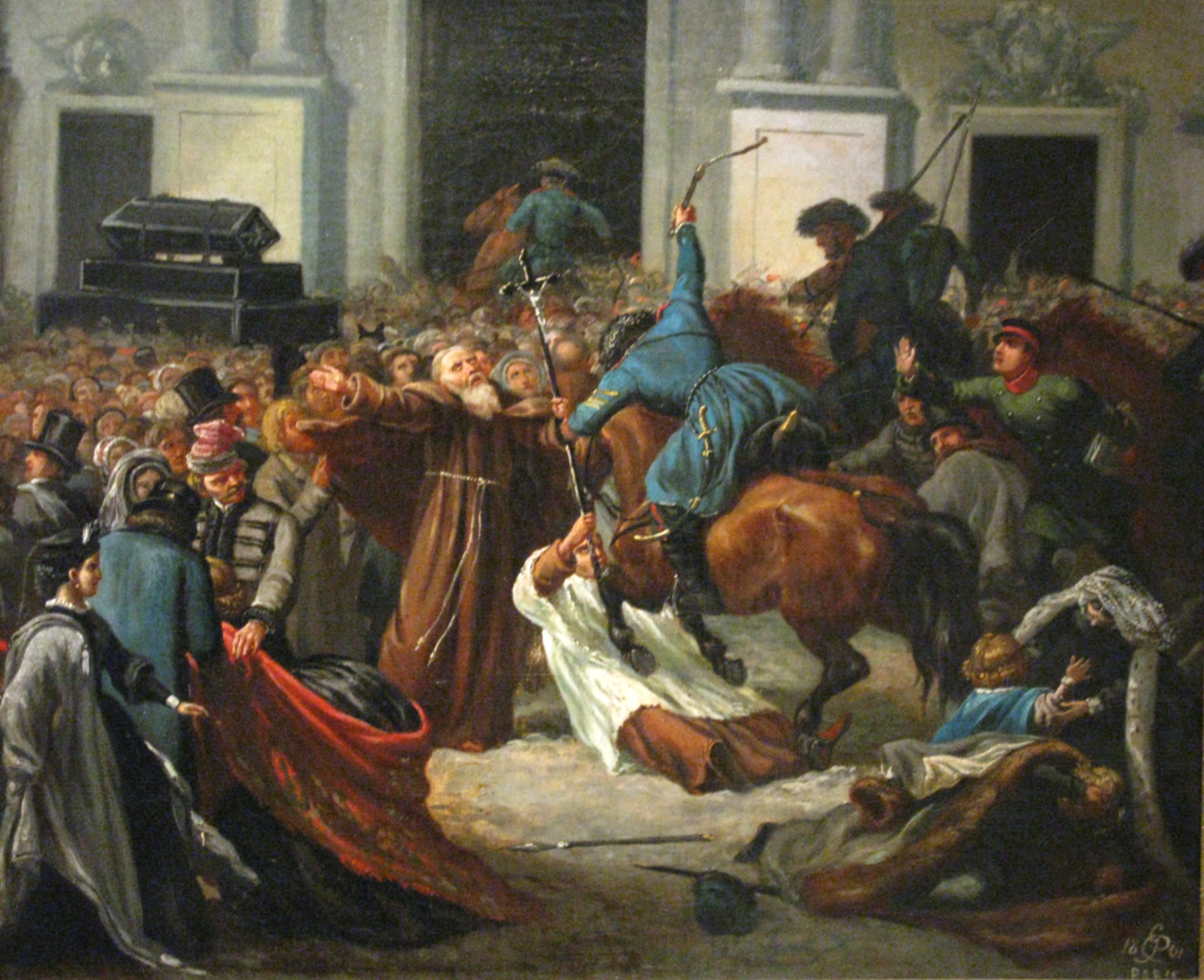
A patriotic demonstration in front of St. Anne's, February 27, 1861, which ended in much bloodshed.

The St. Anne's Church was reconstructed several times in 1603, 1634, 1636 and in 1667 (it was heavily damaged during the siege of Warsaw and plundered by Swedish and German troops in the 1650s). Between 1740 and 1760 the façade was reconstructed in rococo style according to Jakub Fontana's design and decorated with two filigree belfries. The walls and semicircular vault ceilings of the church, divided into bays, were decorated at that time with profuse paintings in perspective, using illusionary techniques and depicting scenes in the life of Saint Anne. A chapel of Saint Ładysław was also decorated in this fashion. All paintings were by Friar Walenty Żebrowski.

The church was reconstructed for the last time between 1786 and 1788 by order of King Stanisław August Poniatowski.

During the Warsaw Uprising of 1794, part of the national Kościuszko Uprising in 1794, Bishop Józef Kossakowski, considered the traitor of the nation, was executed in front of the church (hanged with a great applause by Warsaw inhabitants).

The roof of the church was heavily damaged in the air raid on Warsaw in 1939 and then destroyed by fire in 1944 during the Warsaw Uprising but soon repaired. In 1949 the walls were undermined by the excavation for the WZ route and had to be quickly reinforced. Restoration of all elements was undertaken from the 1940s-70s, supervised by architect Beata Trylińska.

== Façade and interior ==
The present façade was built in 1788 in a Neoclassical style typical of the reign of King Stanisław August Poniatowski, by Chrystian Piotr Aigner. Sculptors of that time were Jakub Monaldi and Franciszek Pinck, who carved statues of the Four Evangelists which decorate the façade. The interior of the church is now in high-baroque style with several chapels. The church makes an overwhelming impression on the visitor with its surprisingly rich interior filled with frescoes.

The only example of a diamond vault preserved in Warsaw can be seen in the cloister leading to the vestry.

== See also ==
- Castle Square
- Krakowskie Przedmieście
- Presidential Palace
- Presidential Palace cross
- St. Florian's Cathedral

== Notes ==
In-line:

== Gallery ==
=== Historical images ===
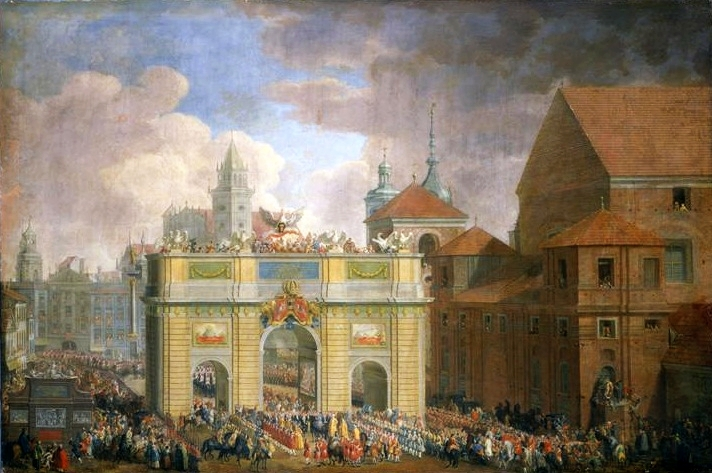
St. Anne's Church (right) in 1734, by Johann Samuel Mock

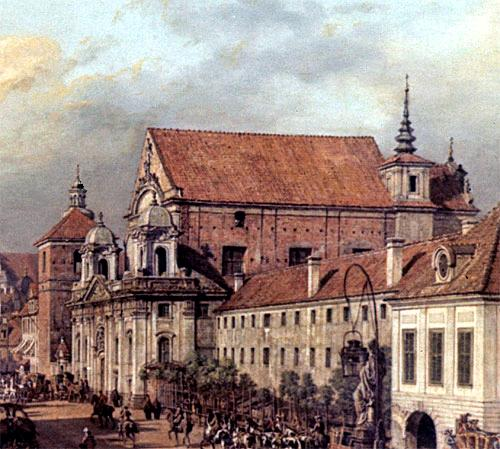
The church by Bernardo Bellotto, 1770s

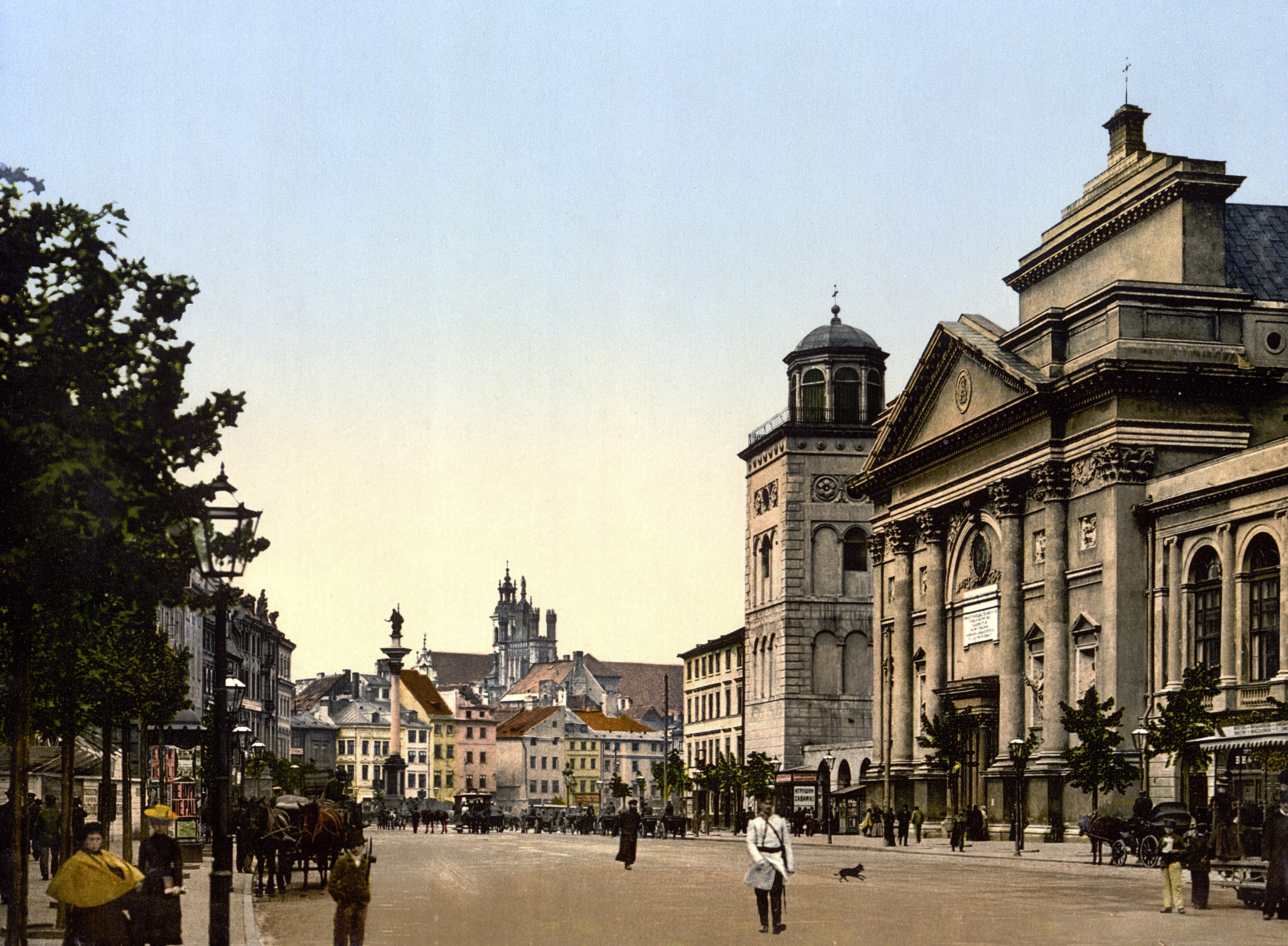
St. Anne's about 1900

=== Interior ===
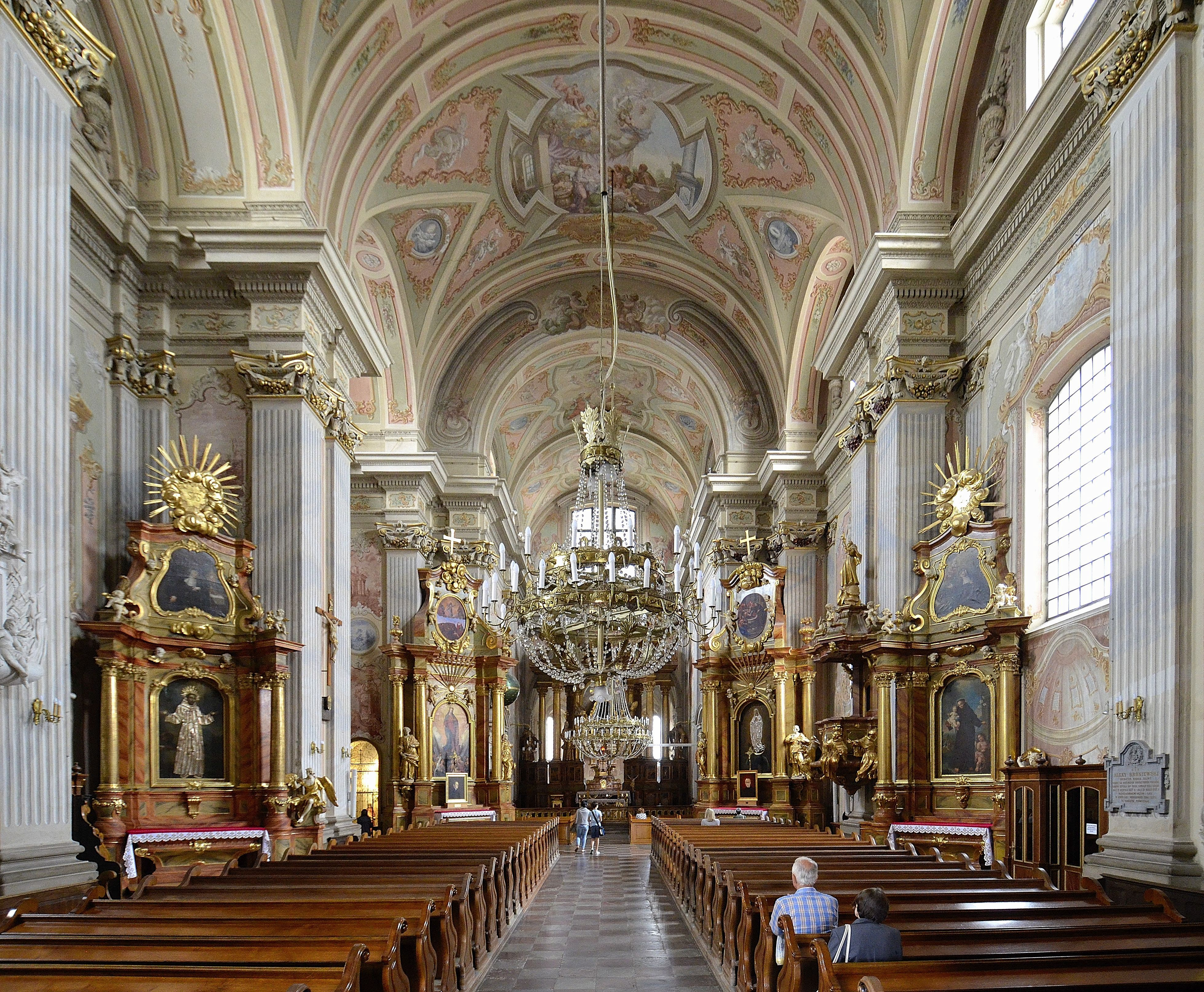
General view

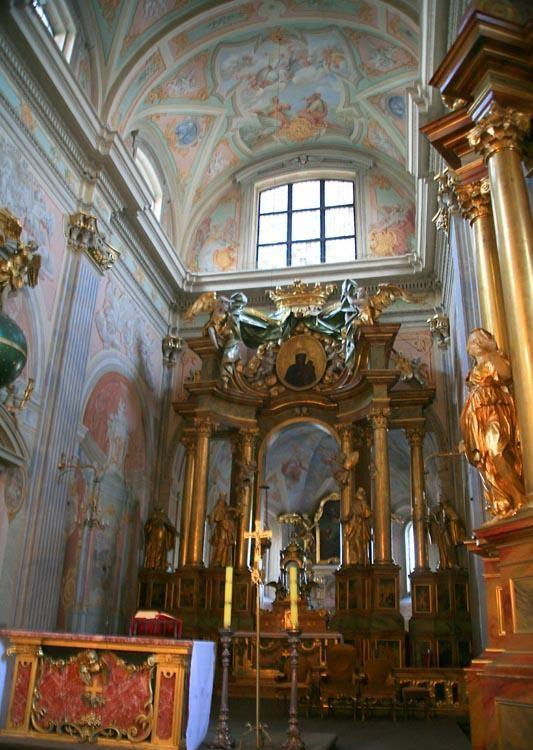
Main altar

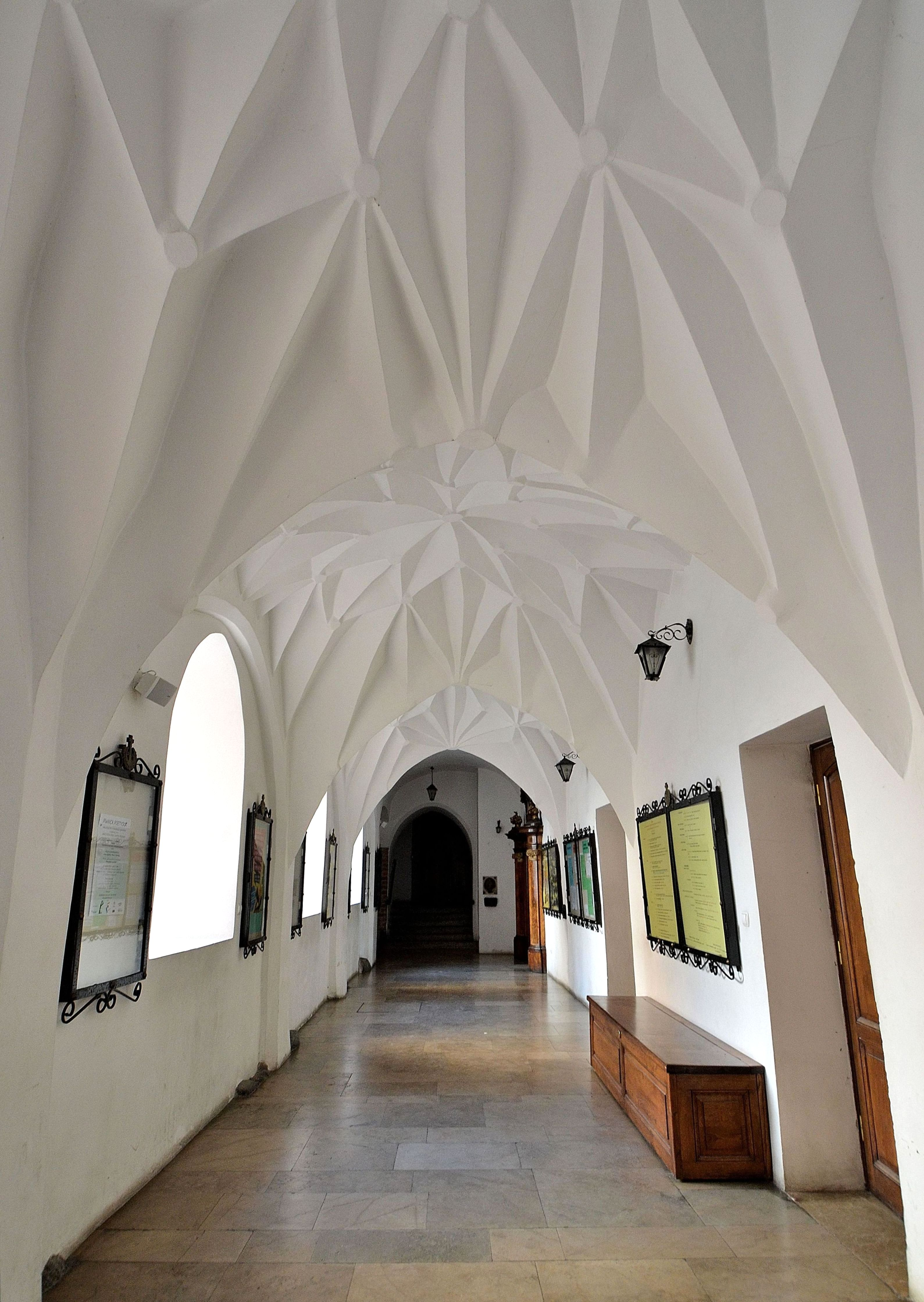
Gothic diamond vaults in the cloister

=== Exterior ===
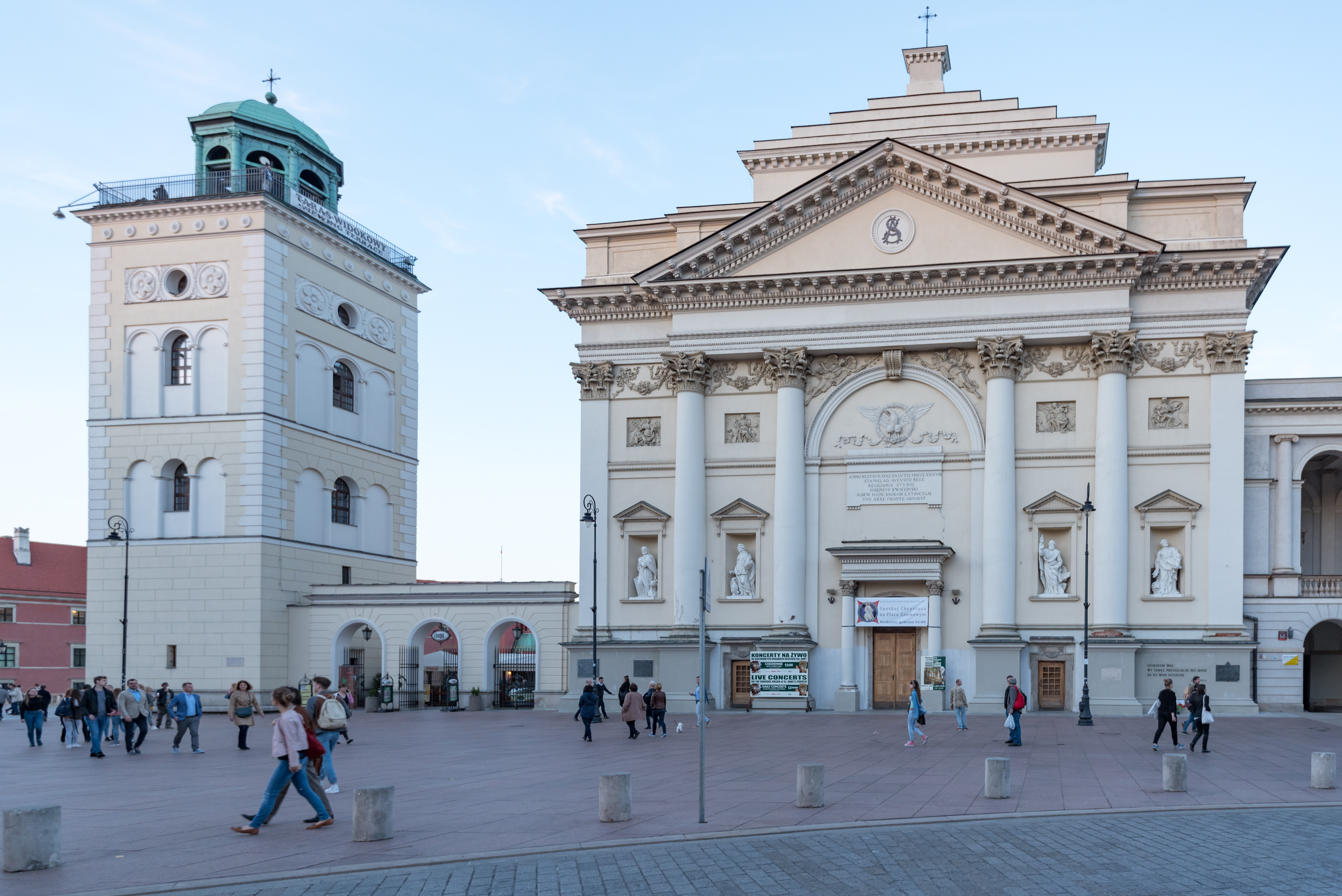
The St. Anne's bell tower

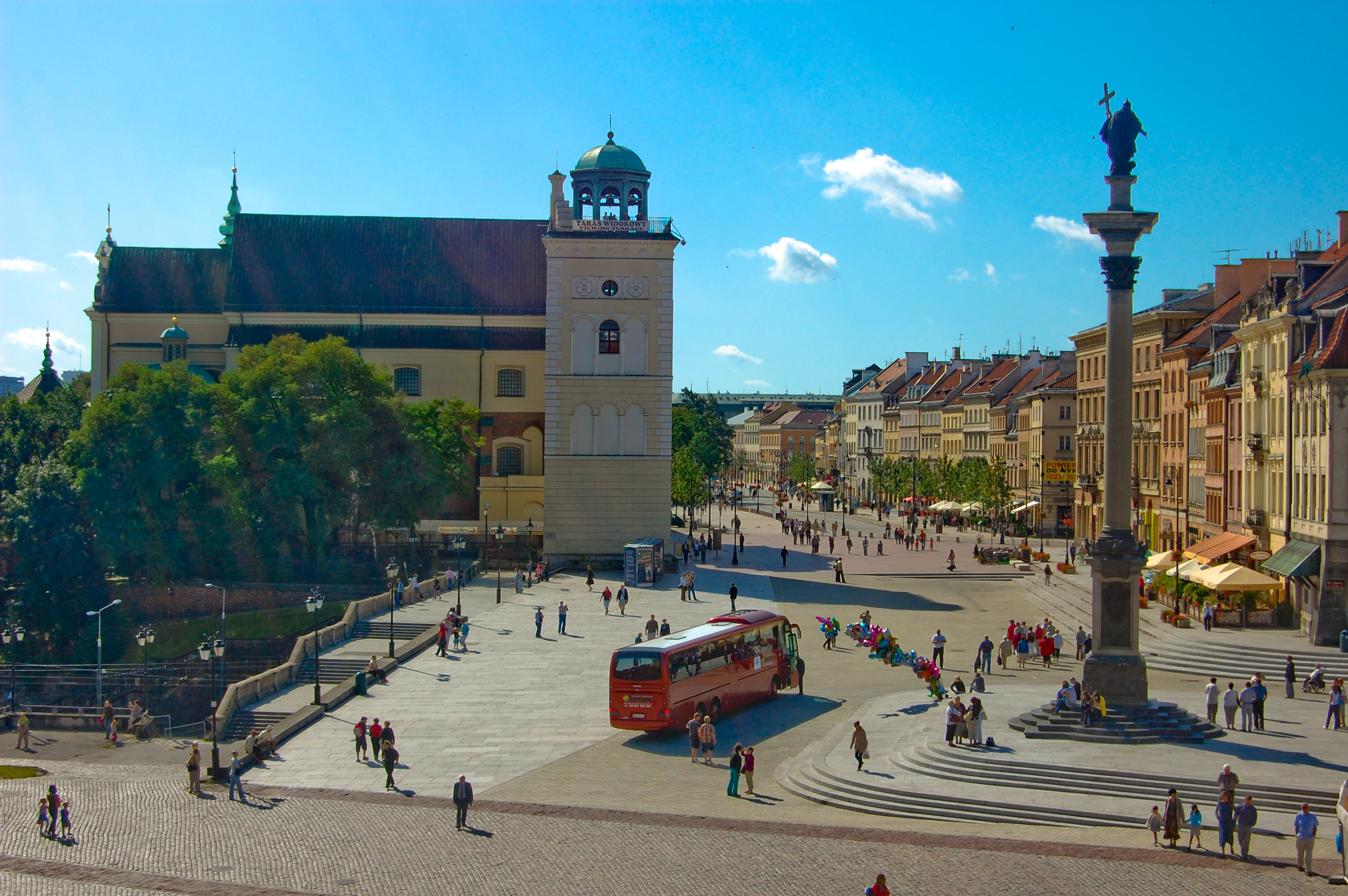
The church as seen from the Castle Square

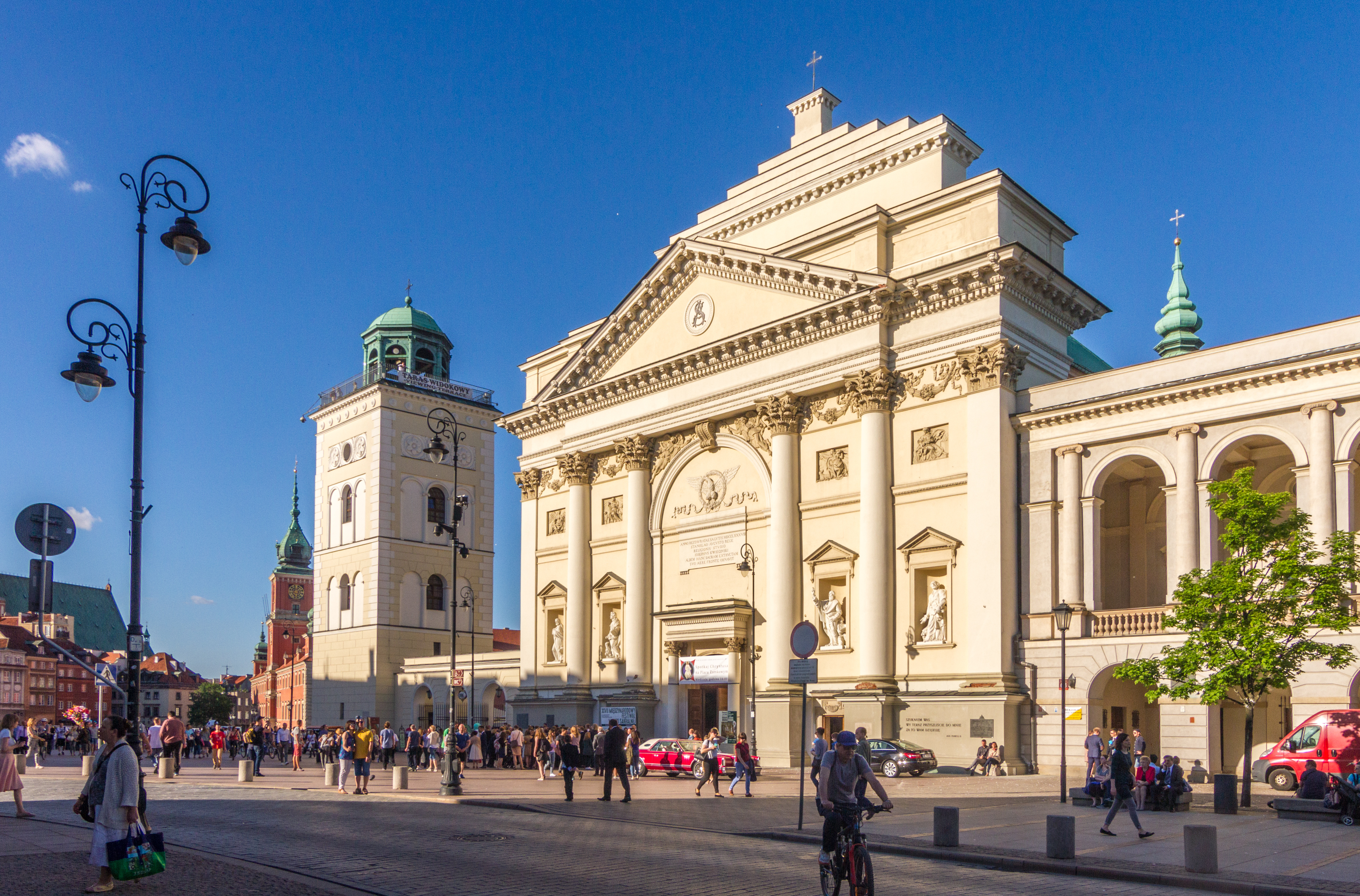
St. Anne's Church in Warsaw with colonnade

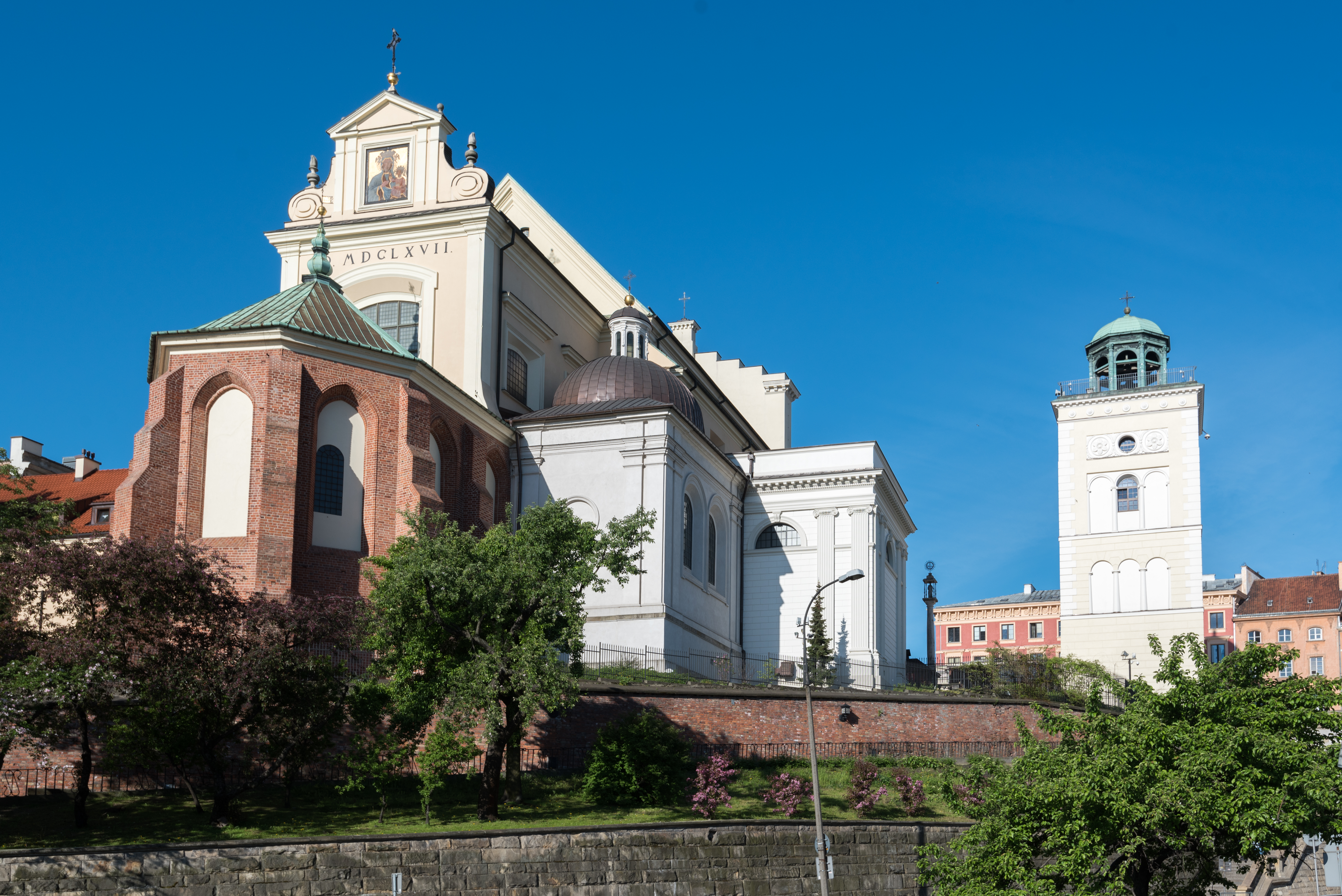
View from W-Z Route
