= Sejm cross =

Religious symbol in Polish parliament hall

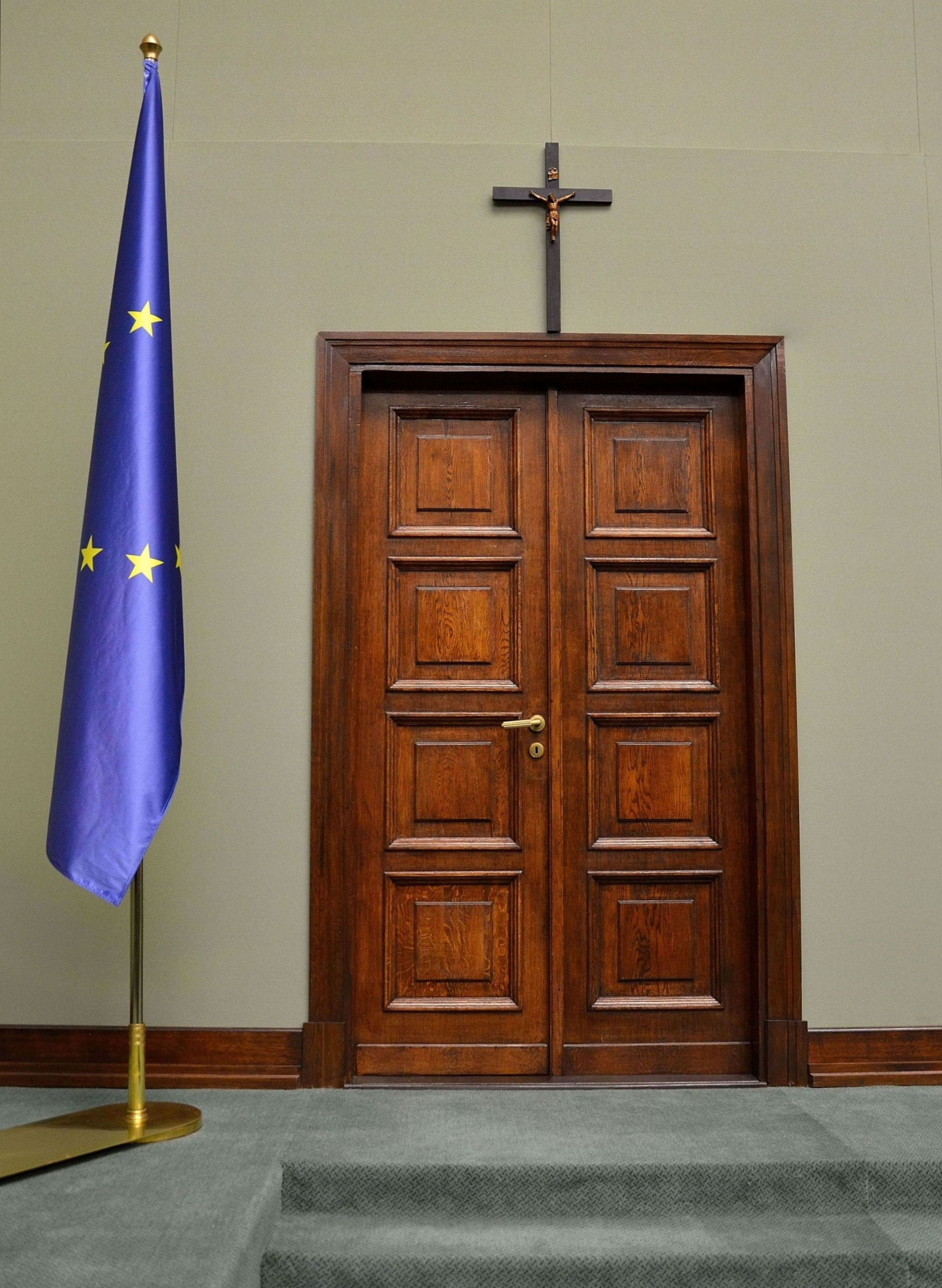
The Sejm cross

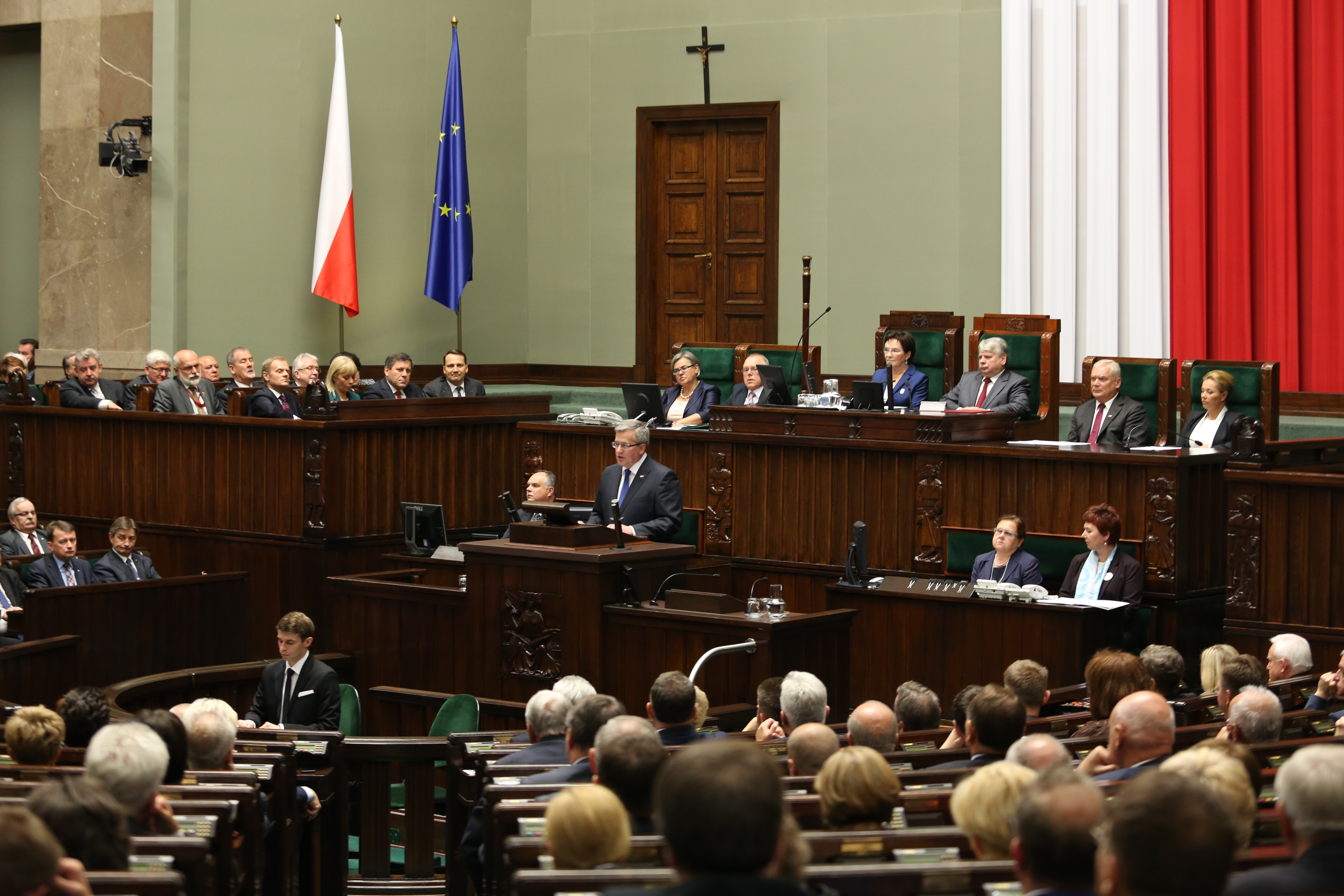
The Cross visible in The Sejm Session Hall

The Sejm cross (Polish: Krzyż sejmowy) is a Catholic crucifix in the building of the Sejm of the Republic of Poland, the lower house of the Polish parliament.

The Sejm cross hangs above the door on the left-hand side of the rostrum in the Sejm Plenary Hall. It was hung there by a Solidarity Electoral Action (AWS) MP Tomasz Wójcik and his colleague in the night between October 19 and 20 of 1997, shortly after the AWS and the Freedom Union signed a coalition agreement. The cross was a gift from the mother of Fr. Jerzy Popiełuszko, priest and martyr murdered by the Służba Bezpieczeństwa (communist political police) in 1984.

The spokesman of the Democratic Left Alliance (SLD) protested against the presence of the cross in the Sejm, saying that it was hung there in order to provoke a brawl. Other opponents called it a violation of the Constitution (which came into effect two days before the act) which states that the Republic of Poland is neutral in religious matters. Nobody disputed the fact that the hanging of the cross was illegal - Wójcik got into the Sejm chamber without any approval and other MPs had never discussed the issue before. Nonetheless, the cross has been hanging in the chamber ever since - even when the Democratic Left Alliance won the elections in 2001.

In 2011 the Chancellery of the Sejm commissioned and published four legal opinions concerning the presence of the cross in the Sejm Plenary Hall.

A 1997 poll found that 52% of respondents believed that a cross should hang in the Sejm, 29% were against, 16% were indifferent and 3% had no opinion. A 2011 poll found that support was at 70% while 20% were against.

== See also ==
- Cross in front of the Presidential Palace in Warsaw
