= Presidential Palace cross =

Memorial in Warsaw, Poland

Coordinates: 52°14′34″N 21°00′55″E

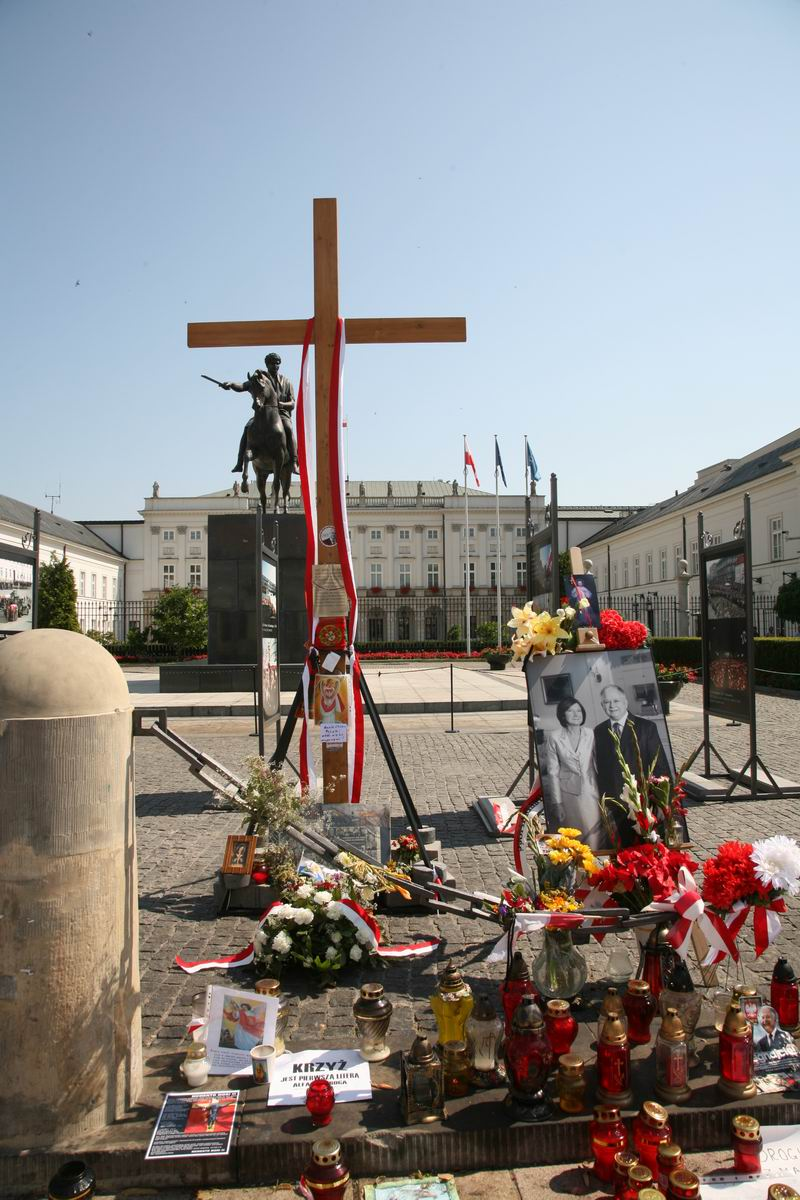
The cross, 23 July 2010, in front of the Presidential Palace.

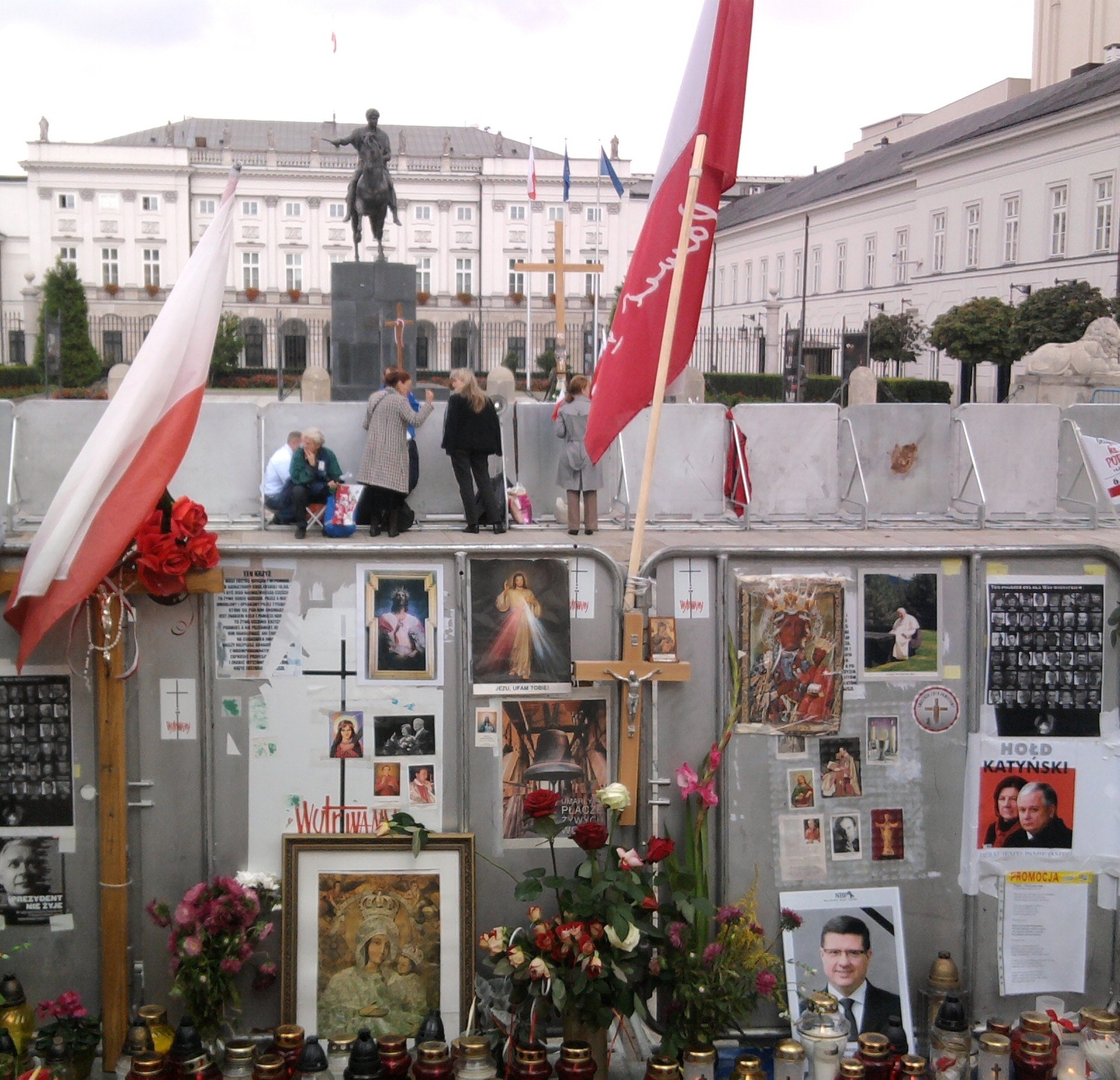
The cross, 10 September 2010, visible in the background. In front, the barricade wall decorated by the "defenders" movement.

The Presidential Palace cross (also known as the Smolensk Cross, Polish: krzyż smoleński) is a wooden cross which was erected as a memorial to the 96 casualties of the 2010 Polish Air Force Tu-154 crash. It was first moved to a chapel in the Presidential Palace on 16 September 2010 and, on 10 November 2010, was again moved, this time to St. Anne's Church, Warsaw, where it currently resides. The cross was controversial, provoking debate in Polish society and media about the issues of separation of church and state, politics, religion and patriotism.

== History ==
The cross was erected spontaneously by a group of Polish Scouts on 15 April 2010, five days after the plane accident. Among those killed in the crash was Polish President Lech Kaczyński of the conservative Law and Justice (PiS) party. Soon after the presidential election, in July 2010, the new Polish president, Bronisław Komorowski, from the more centrist Civic Platform (PO) party, requested that the cross be moved to nearby St. Anne's Church. The move was supported by the Scouts who erected the cross in the first place and the archbishop of Warsaw, but criticized by certain groups, as the issue gained notoriety in the Polish media.

The cross was to be moved on 3 August but this caused increasingly vocal protests from the PiS supporters, known as the "defenders of the cross" (pol. obrońcy krzyża). Most of the defenders believed that the Smolensk air crash was the result of a conspiracy, in which the new Polish government was involved. The defender movement guarded the cross around the clock. The protesters clashed with the police and the cross was not moved on that day. The situation became a contentious issue in Polish politics, as the defenders gained the support of the PiS party.

The defenders of the cross clashed with the young supporters of a secularist counter movement, which maintained that in a secular state a cross has no place in a public space and that it should be removed from its prominent position in front of the Presidential Palace. As the defenders, many of them armed with crucifixes, prayed and sang hymns around the cross, their opponents chanted "Go to church" and declared the defenders to be "Catholic fanatics". One of the opponents carried a cross made of beer cans. The two groups were separated by the police who set up metal barriers to prevent clashes. Many were shocked by the rise of the counter movement, as Poland's younger generation had not been considered politically active.

On 16 September 2010, the cross was moved to a chapel in the Presidential Palace, this time without a prior announcement, as the government did not want to give the defenders movement an opportunity to prepare for their action. On 10 November 2010, it was moved to St. Anne's Church, Warsaw, where it currently resides.

Since 2015, The Polish President has been a member of the conservative Law and Justice (PiS) party and they have had no moves to return the Cross back.

== Debate ==
The cross provoked a major debate in Polish society and the media about the correct way to honor the victims of the April air crash, the positioning of a cross in a public place, relations between the Polish State and the Catholic Church, and the actions taken by the Polish government. The cross was seen as a symbol of this debate.

Polish media devoted significant attention to the event. In August, all of the major Polish news networks had teams monitoring the situation 24 hours a day. An analysis by the National Broadcasting Council revealed that Polish stations devoted a significant amount of time to coverage of the related events. In regard to news coverage on regular channels, the lead was taken by TVP1 (57 min.), followed by TVP2 (42 min.), TVN (39 min.) and Polsat (35 min.), and for the dedicated Polish news channels, TVN24 (366 min.) was ahead of TVP Info (95 min.). For non-news coverage (discussions, analysis, etc.), the lead was taken by TVN24 (279 min.), followed by TVP Info (249 min.), TVP2 (33 min.).

The Catholic Church in Poland was split on the issue; support by many church officials for the removal of the cross has led to their estrangement from the defenders movement.

== See also ==
- Auschwitz cross
- Sejm cross
