= Auschwitz cross =

Memorial for 1941 Auschwitz mass execution

Coordinates: 50.024762°N 19.203072°E

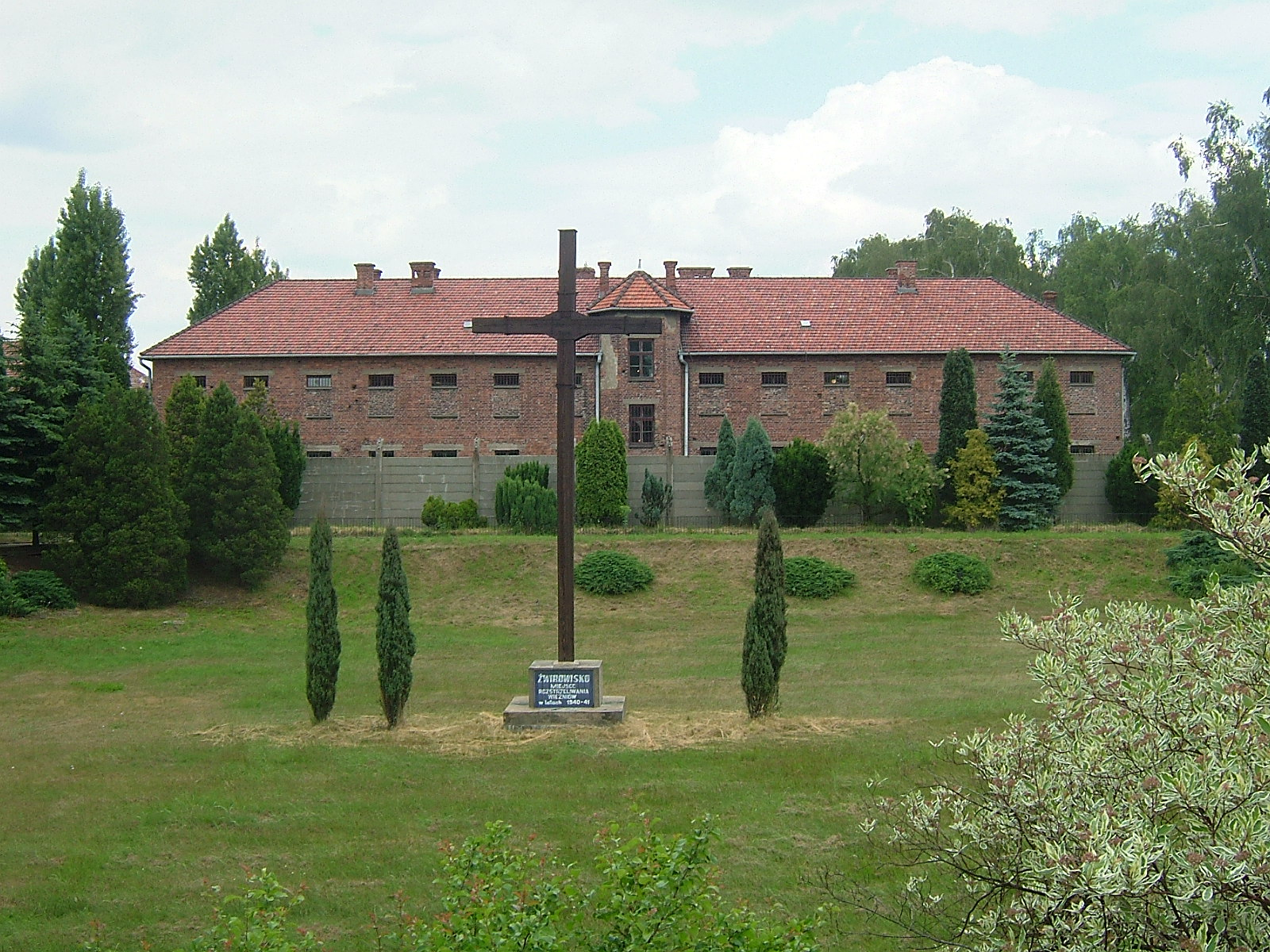
The Auschwitz Cross in June 2008, with Block 11 behind

The Auschwitz cross is a cross in front of the Auschwitz concentration camp, in Oświęcim County, Poland, which was erected to commemorate the spot where 151 prisoners (including 80 Poles) were shot by Gerhard Palitzsch on 11 November, 1941.

== Catholic presence and opposition ==
Carmelite nuns opened a convent near the camp in 1984 and have been major supporters of keeping the cross on the grounds, despite opposition. Prominent Jewish organisations attempted to pressure Poland to remove the cross. Edgar Bronfman, president of the World Jewish Congress called for the removal of the convent. Public statements from Théo Klein, then-president of the Representative Council of French Jewish Institutions, Jewish activist Serge Klarsfeld, and Gerhart Riegner, representative of the World Jewish Congress, also demanded the removal of the convent. The American branch of the World Jewish Congress also protested with statements from chairman Wolfe Kelman and the Orthodox Jewish representative Zvi Zakheim. Representatives of the Catholic Church agreed in 1987. [source?]

One year later, the Carmelite nuns erected the large cross, previously used to celebrate Pope John Paul II's 1979 Mass for some 500,000 people on the grounds of the Auschwitz II (Birkenau) extermination camp, to commemorate the spot where 151 prisoners (including 80 Poles) were shot by Gerhard Palitzsch on 11 November, 1941. This Mass took place just outside Block 11, a torture prison in Auschwitz I, visible from within the camp.

Tensions escalated into 1989 when two notable protests occurred: in May, the Women's International Zionist Organization led a protest of 300 members carrying signs and Israeli flags, while in July, New York City Open Orthodox rabbi Avraham Weiss and six supporters led a protest that earned global notoriety. Weiss and his supporters scaled the fence of the convent wearing concentration camp uniforms, then harassed the nuns with banging and shouting until local Polish workers drove them off with buckets of water. Representatives of the Council of Jews and the World Jewish Congress stated that mostly Jews were killed at Auschwitz and demanded religious symbols be kept away from the site. Ian Kagedan of B'nai Brith Canada called the erection of the cross "an obvious gap in understanding."

The Carmelites remained in their convent until 1993, relocating a few hundred meters away from the site.

In March 1998, the government’s Plenipotentiary for Relations with the Jewish Diaspora, Krzysztof Śliwiński, was quoted in a French newspaper as saying that the cross would be removed, because its presence was disrespectful of the Jewish legacy at Auschwitz. By the end of the month, a large group of government and nongovernment leaders, including then-Chief of the Prime Minister's Cabinet Wiesław Walendziak, 130 Sejm deputies, 16 senators, former President Lech Wałęsa, Cardinal Józef Glemp, and Archbishop of Gdańsk Tadeusz Rakoczy, went on record as opposing the removal of the cross. The leader of the Defenders of the Pope's Cross, Kazimierz Świtoń, and Mieczysław Janosz, leader of the Association of War Victims, which leased the land on which the cross stood, distributed leaflets opposing the removal of the cross. Świtoń died in 2014.

== New crosses ==
In August 1998, the erection of some hundreds of additional smaller crosses outside Auschwitz, despite the opposition of the country's bishops, sparked intense controversy in the Polish Catholic and international Jewish community. Government efforts to resolve the situation in the fall of 1998 through the courts by revoking the lease on the land held by the Association of War Victims was met with little success. The government wanted the local courts to agree to appoint an administrator for the former convent site pending a legal decision on the validity of the lease revocation. In October 1998, the local court refused the request to appoint such an administrator, a decision upheld in December 1998 by an appeals court in Bielsko-Biała, which returned the lease issue to the local court. At the end of 1998, complicated legal maneuverings continued, and two separate cases were before the local court - the government's effort to break the lease and the tenants' effort to have the government action ruled illegal.

In May 1999, the Parliament passed a government-sponsored law to protect the sites of all the former camps in the country. The government consulted with international Jewish groups in preparing the law, which gave the government the power it needed to resolve the issue of the "new crosses".

In late May 1999, Świtoń announced that he had laid explosives under the site where the crosses were erected, and that he would detonate them if the government attempted to remove him or the crosses. Police officers quickly arrested Świtoń for possessing explosives and making public threats. After Świtoń's arrest, local authorities removed the crosses to a nearby Franciscan monastery (the St Maximilian Center in Harmęże), under the supervision of the local bishop, and sealed off the site to prevent the erection of additional crosses; nobody came forward to claim the crosses. The large cross is not to be removed from the site for the time being.

An elderly man from the far-right organisation Telewizja Narodowe had built a 2-story tall wooden cross beside a temporary campground on the highway on the day of the 70th anniversary. He denied an interview while sitting by a wood-burning fireplace under a blue cover.

== See also ==
- Cross in front of Presidential Palace in Warsaw
