= Walenty Żebrowski =

Polish painter

Walenty Żebrowski (died 15 May 1765 in Kalisz) was a notable 18th-century Polish painter and a member of the Bernardine order.

In 1733 and 1749 he was recorded in the Poznań convent as the creator of now-lost altarpieces for the Bernardine Church in Poznań. He was the creator of monumental mid-18th-century wall paintings with elaborate thematic programs in Bernardine monastic churches in Wschowa (1745), Warta (1748–1750), the St. Anne's Church in Warsaw (1750–1753), Skępe (1753–1755?), the Church of the Visitation of the Blessed Virgin Mary in Kalisz (1760–1762), and St. Anthony's Church in Ostrołęka (1762–1765).
