= Presidential Palace, Warsaw =

Residence of the president of Poland

Coordinates: 52°14′34.83″N 21°00′58.5″E

Presidential Palace
- Pałac Prezydencki
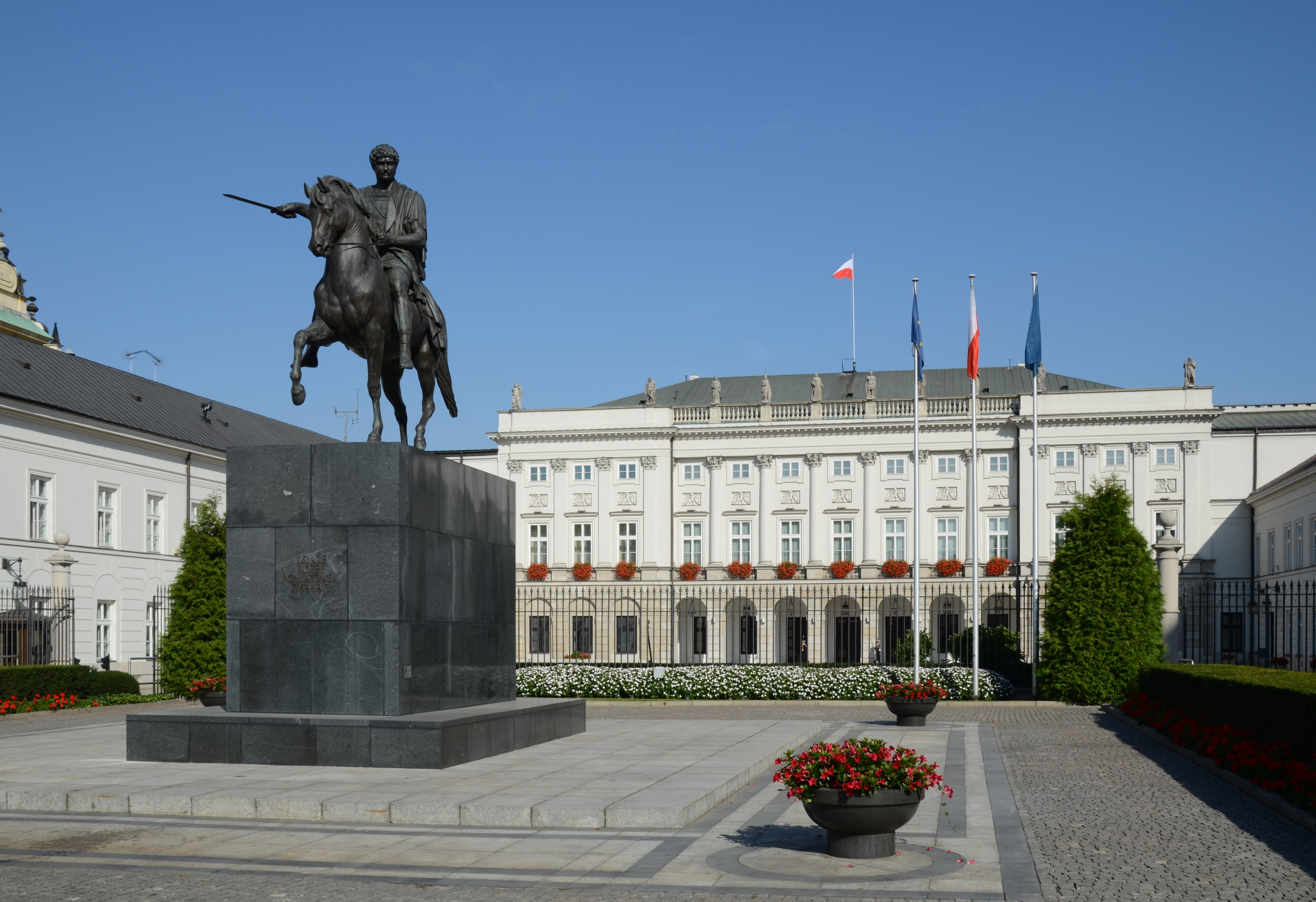
- View of the palace with a statue of Józef Poniatowski in the foreground
- Interactive map of the Presidential Palace area

General information
- Architectural style: Neoclassical (1818)
- Location: Krakowskie Przedmieście 46/48, Warsaw, Poland
- Current tenants: Karol Nawrocki, as President of Poland
- Construction started: 1643
- Client: Stanisław Koniecpolski (1643)
- Owner: Government of Poland

Design and construction
- Architect: Chrystian Piotr Aigner (1818)

Historic Monument of Poland
- Designated: 1994-09-08
- Part of: Warsaw – historic city center with the Royal Route and Wilanów
- Reference no.: M.P. 1994 nr 50 poz. 423

The Presidential Palace (Polish: Pałac Prezydencki) is the official residence of the Polish head of state and president alongside the Belweder Palace, located in Warsaw, Poland. Originally constructed in 1643 as an aristocratic mansion, it was rebuilt and remodelled several times over the course of its existence by notable architects. The current neoclassical palace was completed in 1818.

Throughout its history, the palace was a venue for important historical events in Polish, European, and world history. In 1791, the facility hosted authors and advocates of the Constitution of 3 May 1791, the first modern European constitution. In 1818, the palace began its ongoing career as a governmental structure when it became the seat of the Polish Viceroy (namiestnik) of the autonomous Congress Poland, Józef Zajączek.

Following Poland's resurrection after World War I, in 1918, the building was taken over by the newly reconstituted Polish authorities and became the seat of the Council of Ministers. During World War II, it served as a Deutsches Haus for the country's German occupiers and survived the 1944 Warsaw Uprising intact. After the war, it resumed its function as seat of the Polish Council of Ministers. On 14 May 1955, the Warsaw Pact was signed inside the Presidential Palace between the Soviet Union and the Eastern Bloc countries. Since July 1994, the palace has been the official seat of the president of the Republic of Poland.

== History ==
=== Palace during Polish-Lithuanian Commonwealth: 1643—1795 ===
Construction of the present-day Presidential Palace in Warsaw was begun in 1643 by Crown Great Hetman Stanisław Koniecpolski, owner of the town of Brody (80 km. east of Lwów) and of numerous latifundia situated in Poland's eastern borderlands; hence the palace's first name was "Pałac Koniecpolskich"—the "Koniecpolski Palace". It was said that he owned so much landed property that he could cross the breadth of the Commonwealth while spending every night in one of his own manors. The palace was not completed in the Hetman's lifetime, as he died unexpectedly in 1646 at his Brody residence, a few weeks after taking a young wife.

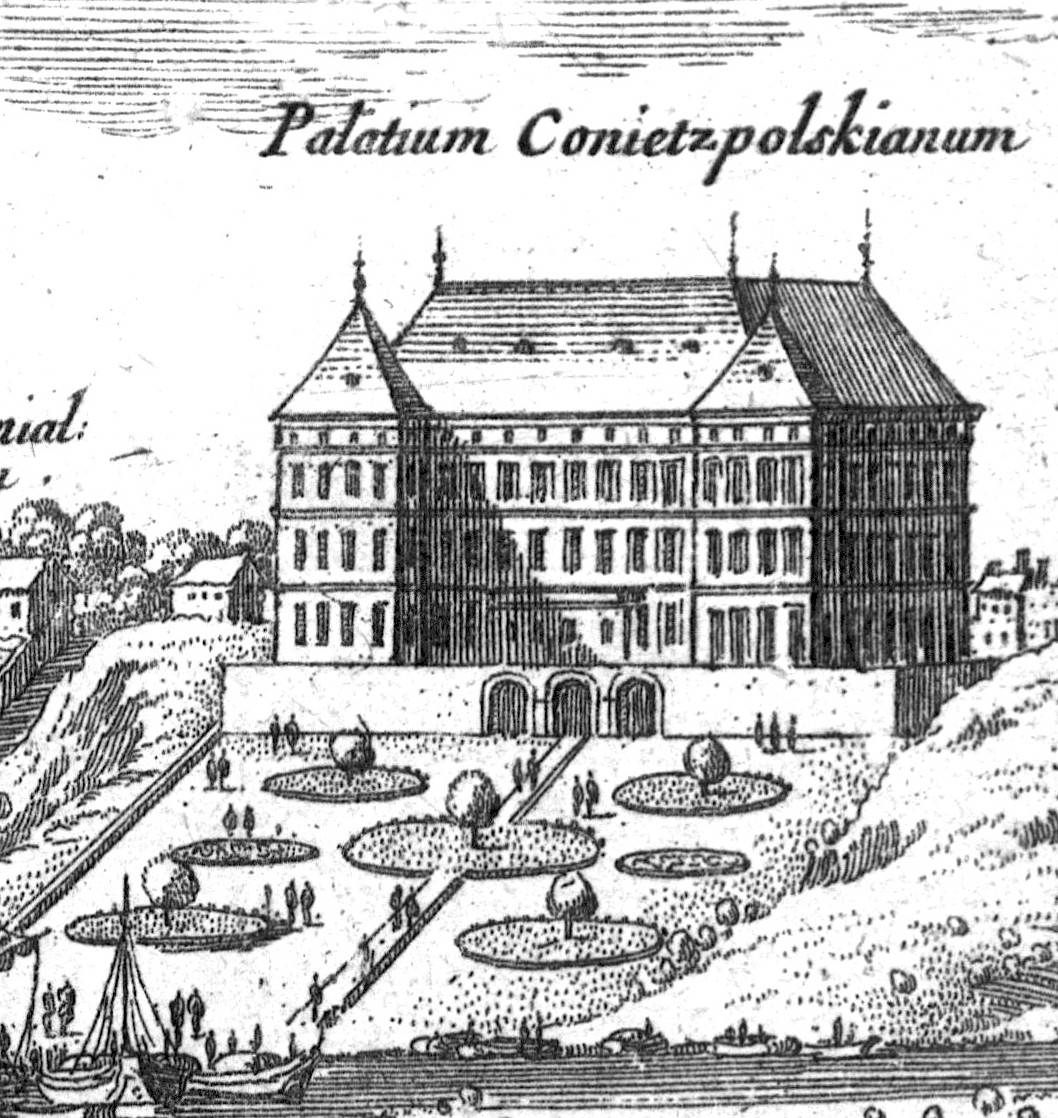
Koniecpolski Palace in 1656; it was burned down during the Deluge

The palace's architect was Constantino Tencalla, architect to Poland's King Władysław IV and designer of Sigismund's Column, in front of the nearby Royal Castle, commemorating Sigismund III of Poland. The palace was completed by Koniecpolski's son Aleksander in the style of a baroque residence, imitating those of northern Italy and Genoa. A view of the palace in a Warsaw panorama of 1656 by Erik Dahlberg confirms this.

The next owner of the palace was Jerzy Sebastian Lubomirski—Grand Crown Hetman and Crown Chancellor, and later the leader of a rebellion against the king—who bought the palace from Aleksander Koniecpolski.

In 1674 the palace became, for the next 144 years, the property of the Radziwiłł family.

It was bought from descendants of Jerzy Sebastian Lubomirski—Stanisław Herakliusz Lubomirski and Hieronim Augustyn Lubomirski—by Michał Kazimierz Radziwiłł of the Nieśwież–Ołyka line, whose wife Katarzyna was a sister of King Jan III Sobieski. After her death, her son Karol Stanisław Radziwiłł I began renovation of the palace and tidied up its surroundings. He entrusted this task to the king's architect, Augustyn Locci.

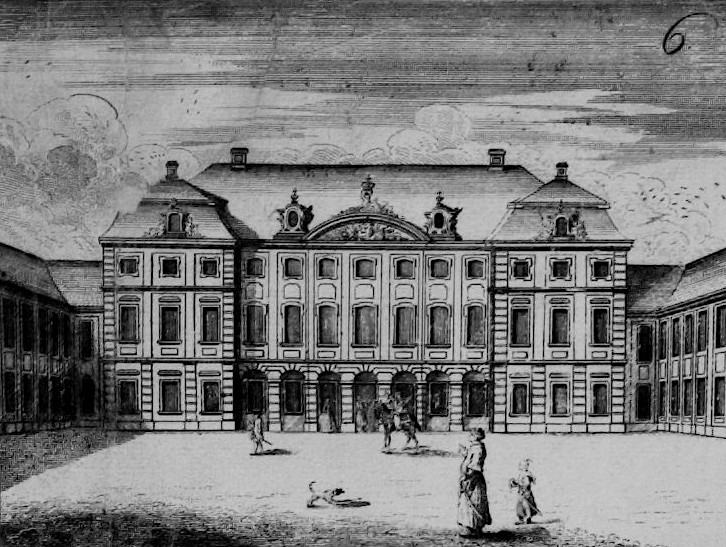
Radziwiłł Palace in 1762

The next-to-last heir in tail of Nieśwież and Ołyka was Karol Stanisław "Panie Kochanku" Radziwiłł, Voivode of Vilnius, son of Michał Kazimierz "Rybeńko" Radziwiłł. He had inherited huge estates from his father and uncle which made him the wealthiest magnate in Poland in the second half of the 18th century, and one of the richest men in Europe. He leased out the palace to Franciszek Ryx to house a theater which staged plays and threw masked balls. During the Four-Year Sejm of 1788–1792, he invited all the members of the four deliberating estates to dine there daily. Two meals were served every day: breakfast before the day's session, for 300 people, and dinner after the session. One of the most impressive feasts given by him was on St. Catherine's Day, 25 November 1789, the 25th anniversary of King Stanisław August's coronation, and commemorating the Union of Lithuania with the Polish Crown. Four thousand guests were invited, and the feast cost over 2 million zlotys.

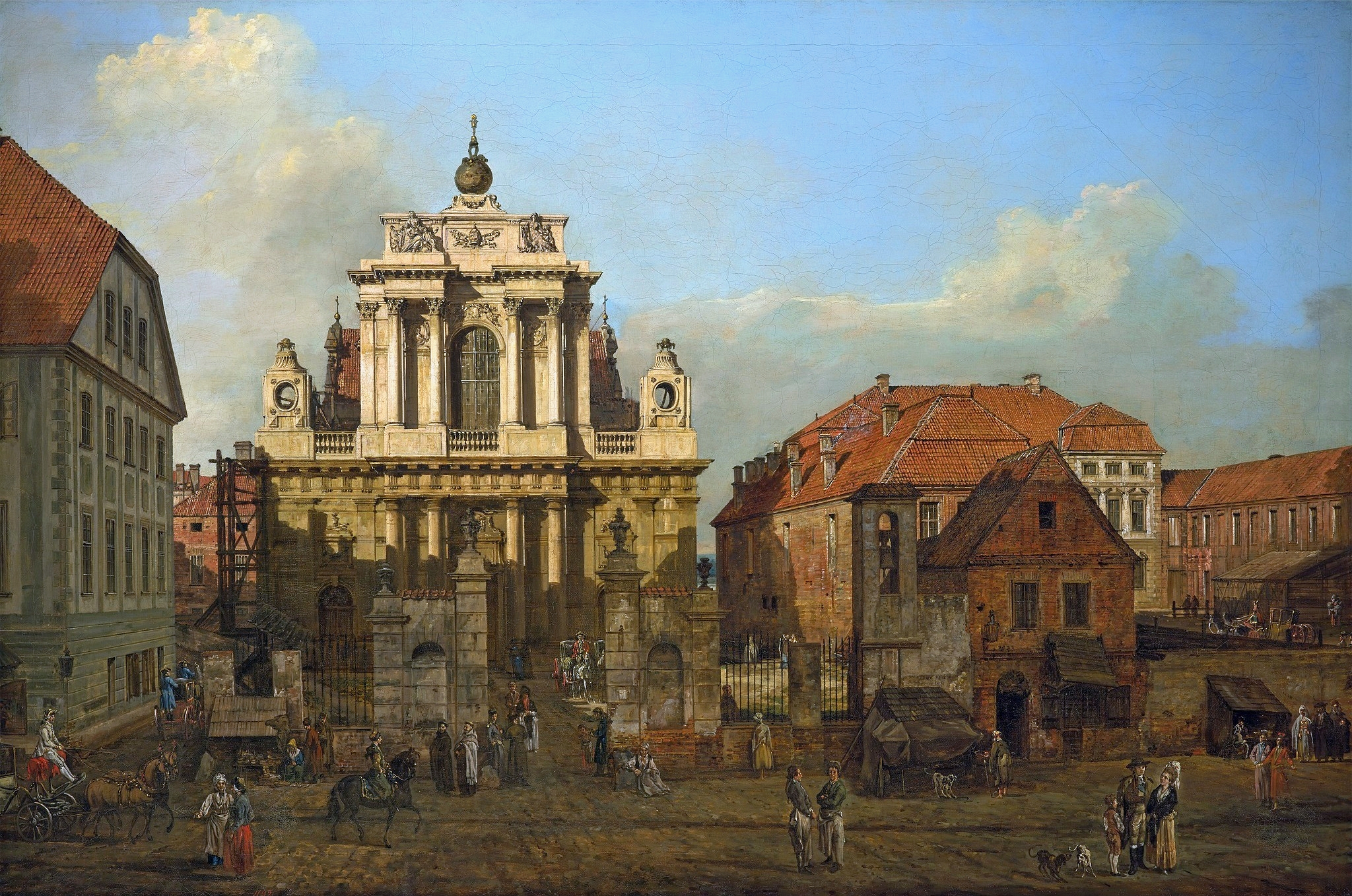
Carmelite Church and Radziwiłł Palace (right) in 1780, painting by Bernardo Bellotto

On the night of 2–3 May 1791, a conspiratorial group of members of the Four-Year Sejm who were bent on saving the Commonwealth met at the palace to strategize means to secure the adoption, next day, of the 3 May Constitution. This document is called "the first constitution of its kind in Europe" by historian Norman Davies.

=== During the partitions: 1795—1918 ===
Karol Stanisław Radziwiłł II died a sick and blind man at age 56. His property was inherited by Dominik, son of his half-brother Hieronim. Dominik, who had been wounded at the Battle of Hanau, died heirless on 11 November 1813. The line of the Nieśwież–Ołyka heirs in tail died out with him.

In 1818 the palace became the seat of the Viceroy of the Polish (Congress) Kingdom (when it acquired the name 'Pałac Namiestnikowski' - the Palace of Namestnik of Kingdom of Poland). The first Viceroy, from 1815, was Józef Zajączek (1752–1820), former aide-de-champ to Hetman Franciszek Ksawery Branicki, deputy to the Four-year Sejm, secretary of the Friends of the Constitution (i.e., of the 3 May Constitution), a division commander during the Polish-Russian War of 1792, hero of the Battle of Zieleńce, a Polish Jacobin, a soldier in Jan Henryk Dąbrowski's legions, a general of Napoleon's. At the last he adopted a servile attitude toward Alexander I, King of Poland and Tsar of Russia, who created him a duke in 1818. Zajączek had lost a leg at the Berezina River and was carried about by his valets in an armchair.

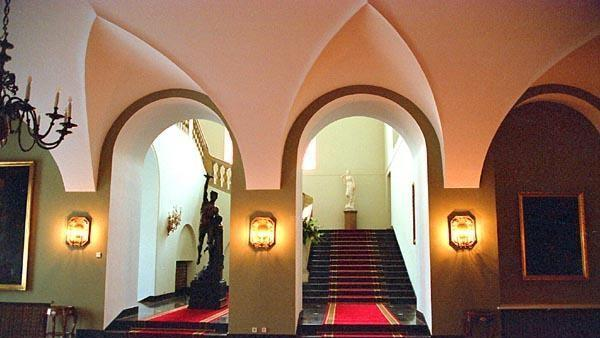
Grand staircase

Beginning in 1818 the palace was rebuilt in classicist style by the architect Chrystian Piotr Aigner (1756–1841). He extended the palace (its lower wings reached the line of buildings on Krakowskie Przedmieście), placed a new grand staircase between the main body of the building and its northern wing, remodeled the palace facades, and redecorated the rooms on the first and second floors of the main body of the building. Because of its massive vaulting, the ground floor remained unchanged. Aigner had two associates: Camillo Landini, who sculpted the four stone lions guarding the palace courtyard on the Krakowskie Przedmieście side, and Mikołaj Monti, an Italian painter. The main body of the building was remodeled to the Corinthian order and ornamented with columns, pilasters, balustrade and stone statues. Aigner is inseparably linked with the Viceregal (Polish: Namiestnikowski)—today, Presidential—Palace as the creator of its classicist exterior, which survives unchanged to this day.

The year 1852 brought disaster to the palace. A fire burned the main body of the building almost to the ground. Only charred walls remained. Reconstruction was entrusted to Alfons Kropiwnicki (1803–1881). The reconstruction of the palace was completed in 1856. The palace obtained the same architectural exterior as before the fire, but the interior was enriched with new decorative elements. The author of the room decorations was Bolesław Podczaszyński.

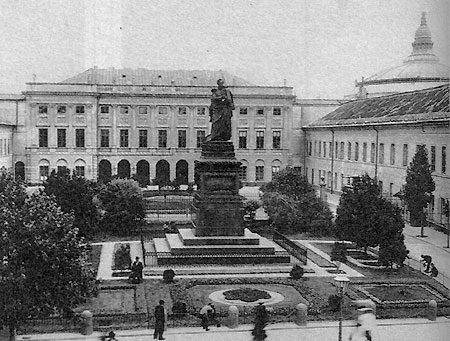
Viceregal Palace, with statue of Ivan Paskevich, before 1900

In the rebuilt palace, gatherings of the Agricultural Society were held, and balls were organized when the tsars visited Poland. In 1870, a statue of Ivan Paskevich was unveiled there. In 1879, in the palace's colonnade hall, the inhabitants of Warsaw for the first time saw "The Battle of Grunwald", a historical painting by Jan Matejko. At the turn of the 20th century, the Tarnowski Palace to the right (south) of the building was pulled down, and in 1899-1901 the luxurious Hotel Bristol was built in its place, designed by Władysław Marconi. One of the shareholders in the consortium that built the hotel was the famous pianist and post-World War I Polish prime minister, Ignacy Paderewski.

=== The Second Republic and the Present Day: 1918—Modern ===
In 1918 the building was taken over by the newly reconstituted Polish authorities, and renovation of the palace was entrusted to Marian Lalewicz. The building became the official seat of the chairman of the Council of Ministers (the prime minister) and of the Council of Ministers itself. The side wings housed the chancellery offices of the Council of Ministers. As restored by Lalewicz, the building was greatly admired by Warsaw's inhabitants and visitors. Germany's Hermann Göring, when in February 1937 calling there on Prime Minister General Felicjan Sławoj Składkowski, took such a keen interest in the palace that he arrived late to his meeting with Polish Foreign Minister Józef Beck.

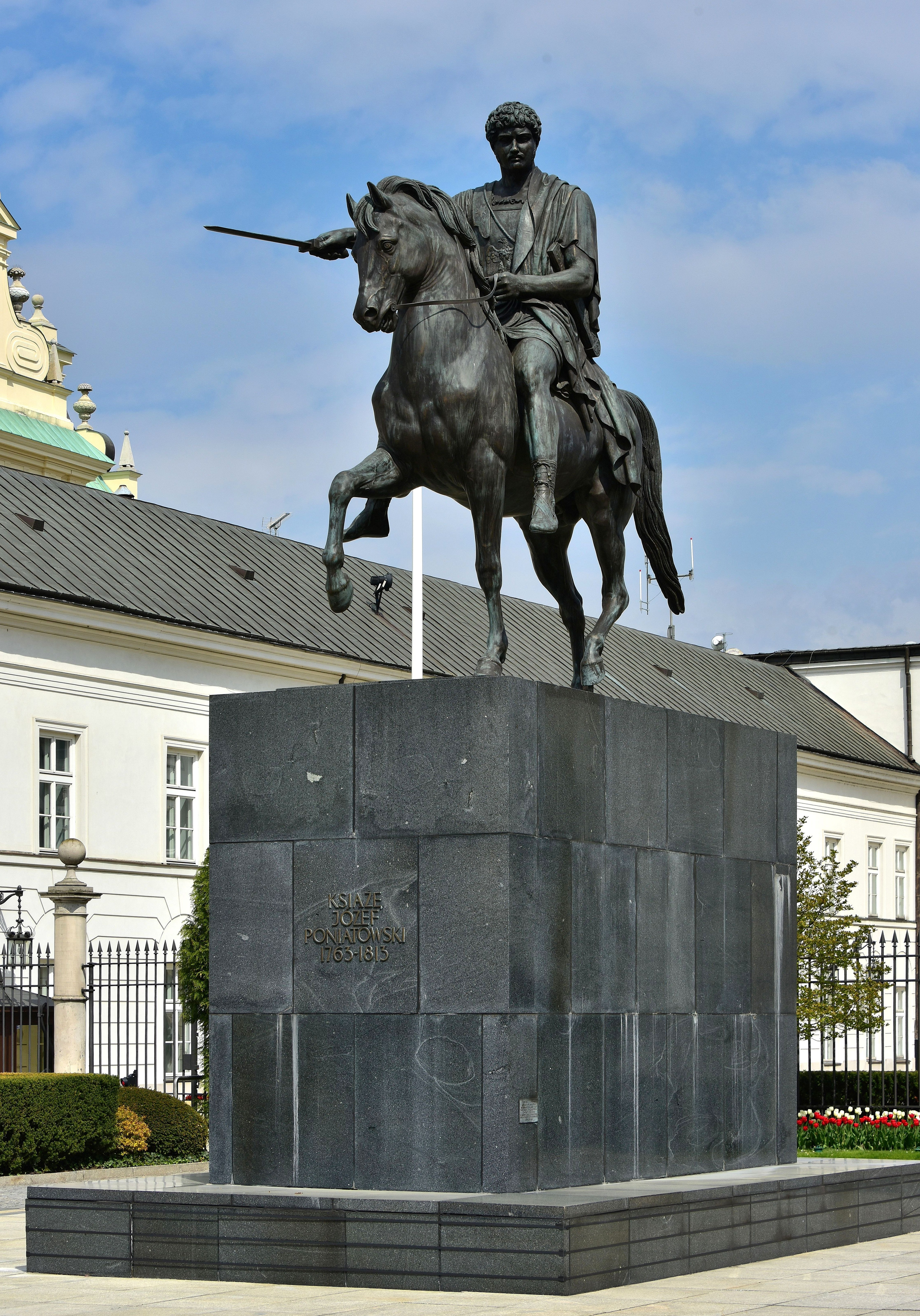
Equestrian statue of Prince Józef Poniatowski

In 1939 the palace suffered minimal damage. In 1941–1942 it was radically reconstructed into a Deutsches Haus by the Polish architects Juliusz Nagórski and Jan Łukasik. In the course of the work, rococo ornamentation in the rooms overlooking the garden was renovated with great care. A couple of grisaille paintings were uncovered on the staircase, featuring eagle and weapon motifs. The Germans wanted to remove the eagles as Polish national emblems, but allowed them to remain after it was explained that these were Napoleonic eagles, a favorite motif of the French Empire period. On the ground floor of the right wing, a restaurant was put in, with wooden beam ceiling and a spacious cloakroom. The palace survived the Warsaw Uprising intact.

After World War II, the palace was thoroughly reconstructed by Antoni Brusche and Antoni Jawornicki. In 1965 Bertel Thorvaldsen's classicist equestrian statue of Prince Józef Poniatowski, which previously had stood before the now destroyed Polish General Staff building (the "Saxon Palace") on nearby Piłsudski Square (once known as "Saxon Square"), was relocated to the courtyard before the "Viceroy's Palace."

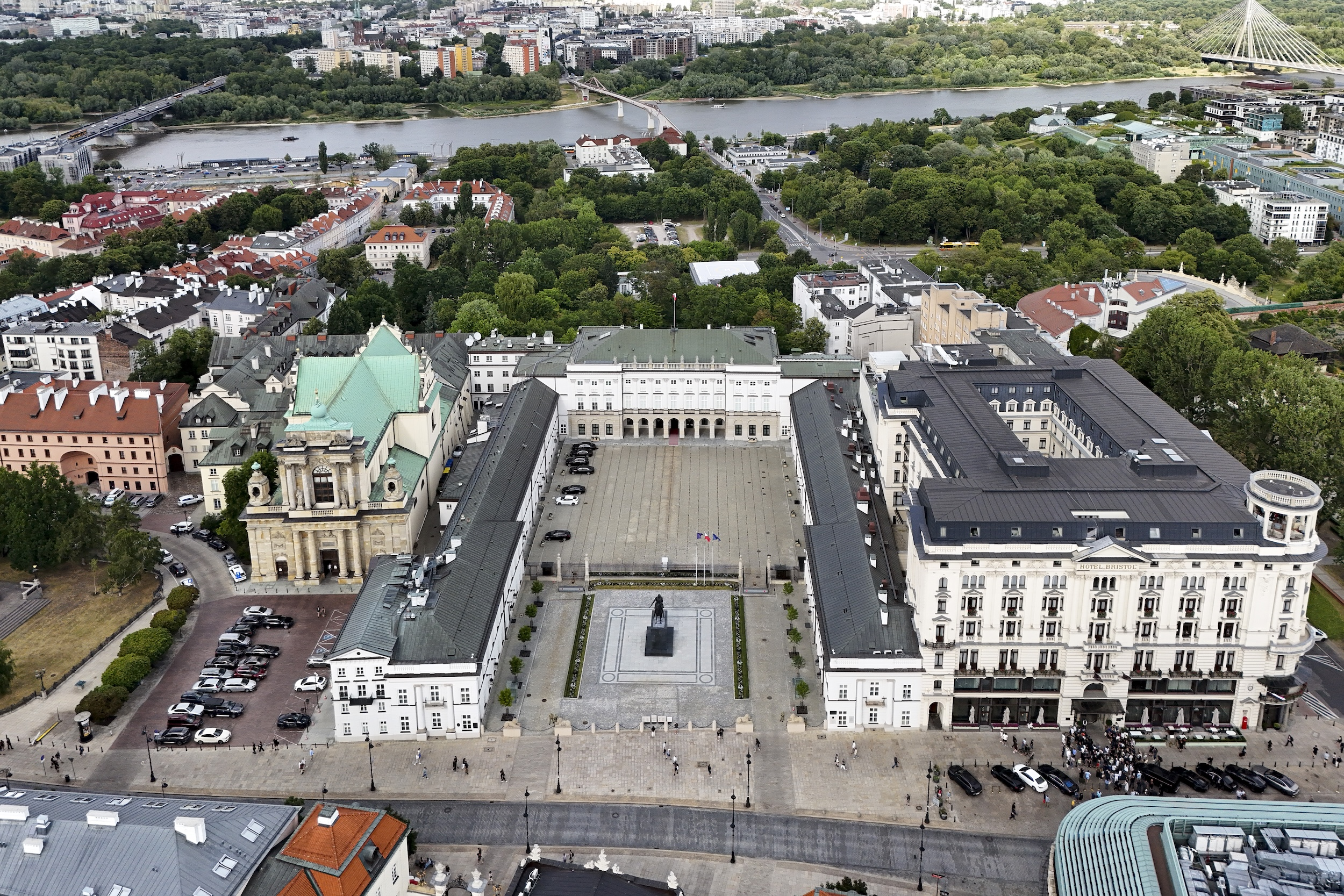
Presidential Palace, 2025

The reconstructed palace again served as the seat of the Council of Ministers until the latter moved to its current seat at the Chancellery on Ujazdów Avenue.

Since July 1994, the palace has been the official seat of the president of the Republic of Poland replacing the smaller Belweder palace. However, President Bronislaw Komorowski decided to move the residence back to Belweder, purportedly in honor of Józef Piłsudski and the early presidents of Poland, but the move was understood as an attempt to avoid confrontations with mourners of the late president Lech Kaczyński, killed in the April 2010 Smolensk air disaster in Russia, who were congregating in front of the palace.

== Gallery ==
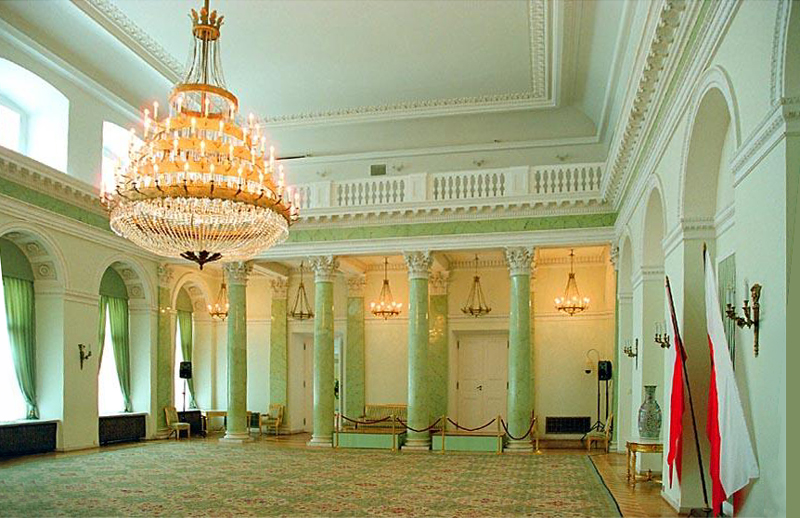
Column Hall

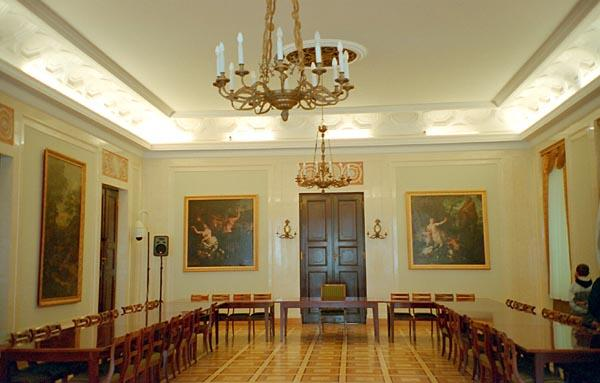
Drawing Room

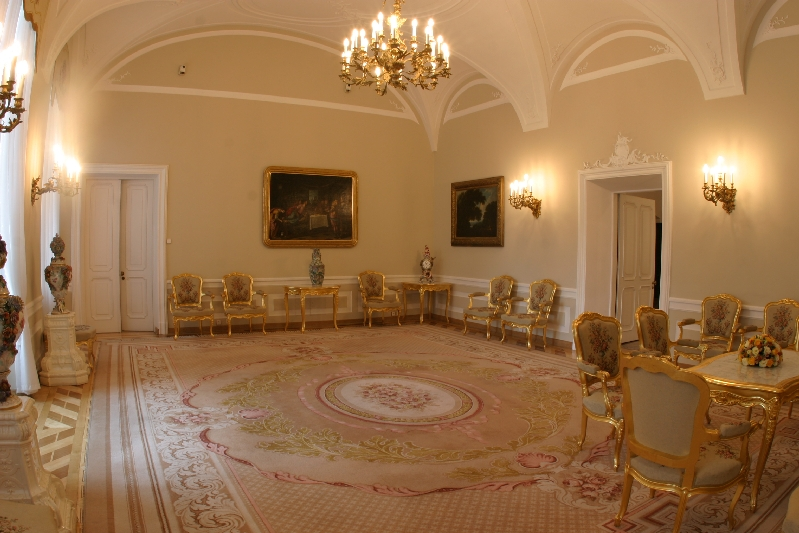
White Room

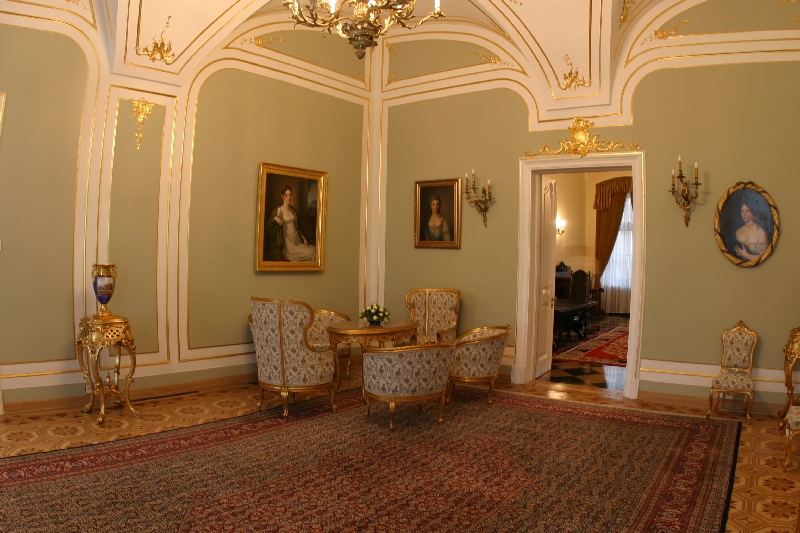
Rococo Room

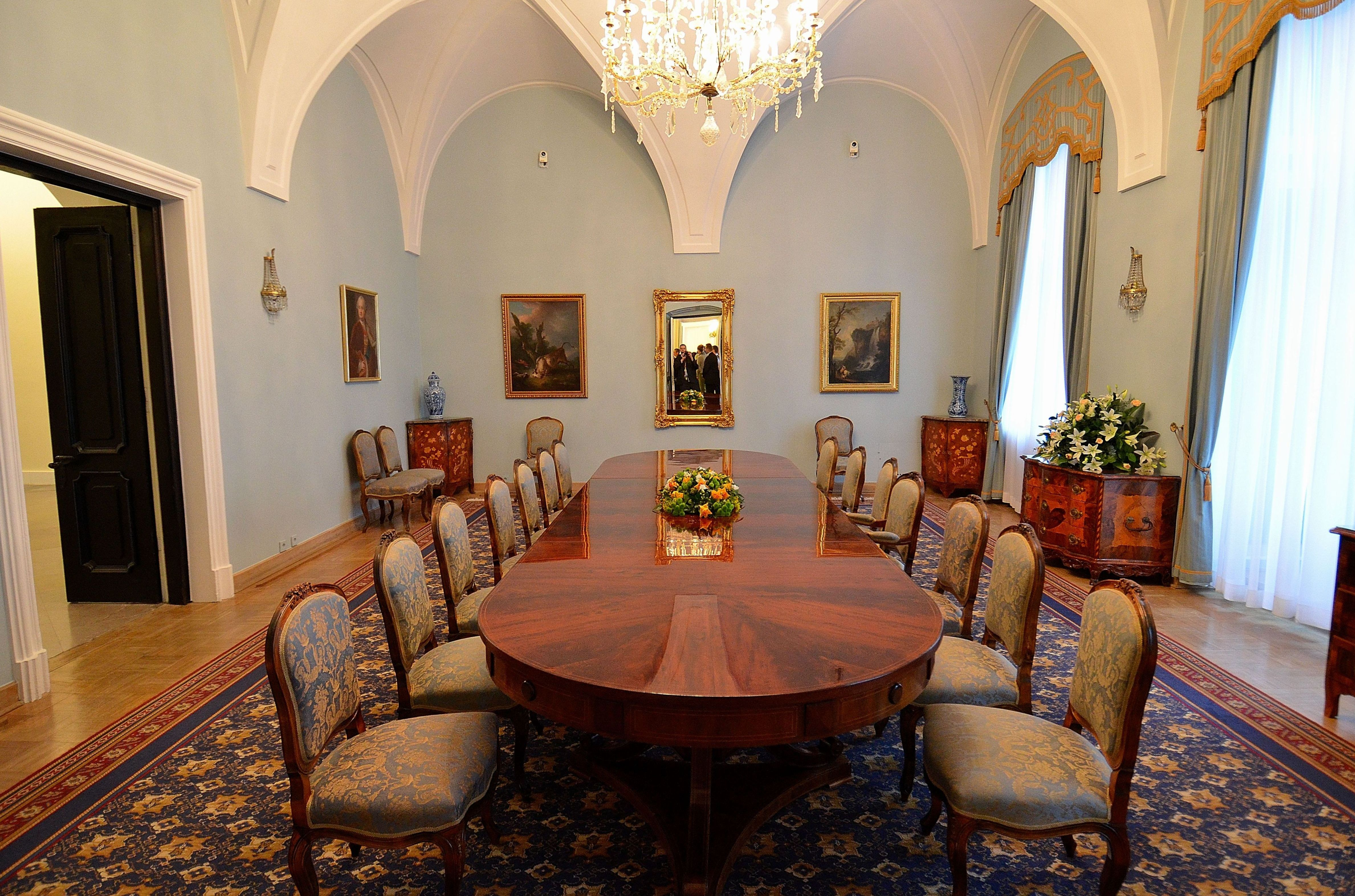
The Blue Hall

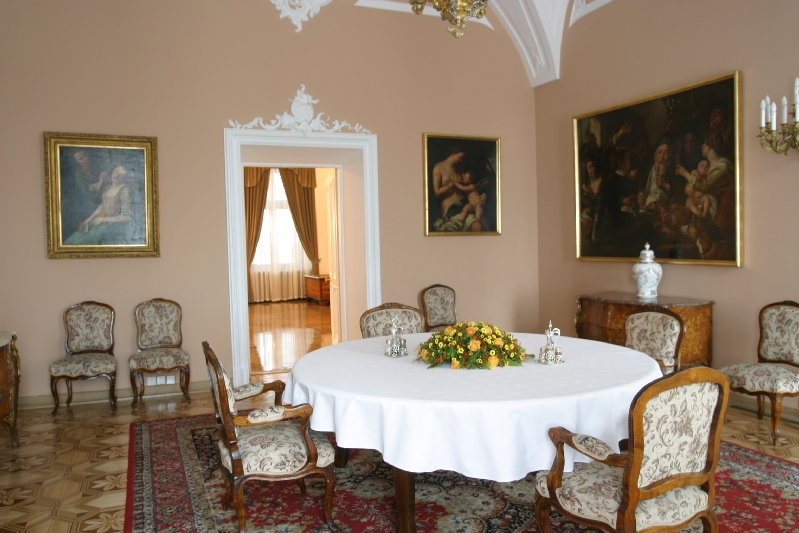
Dining Room

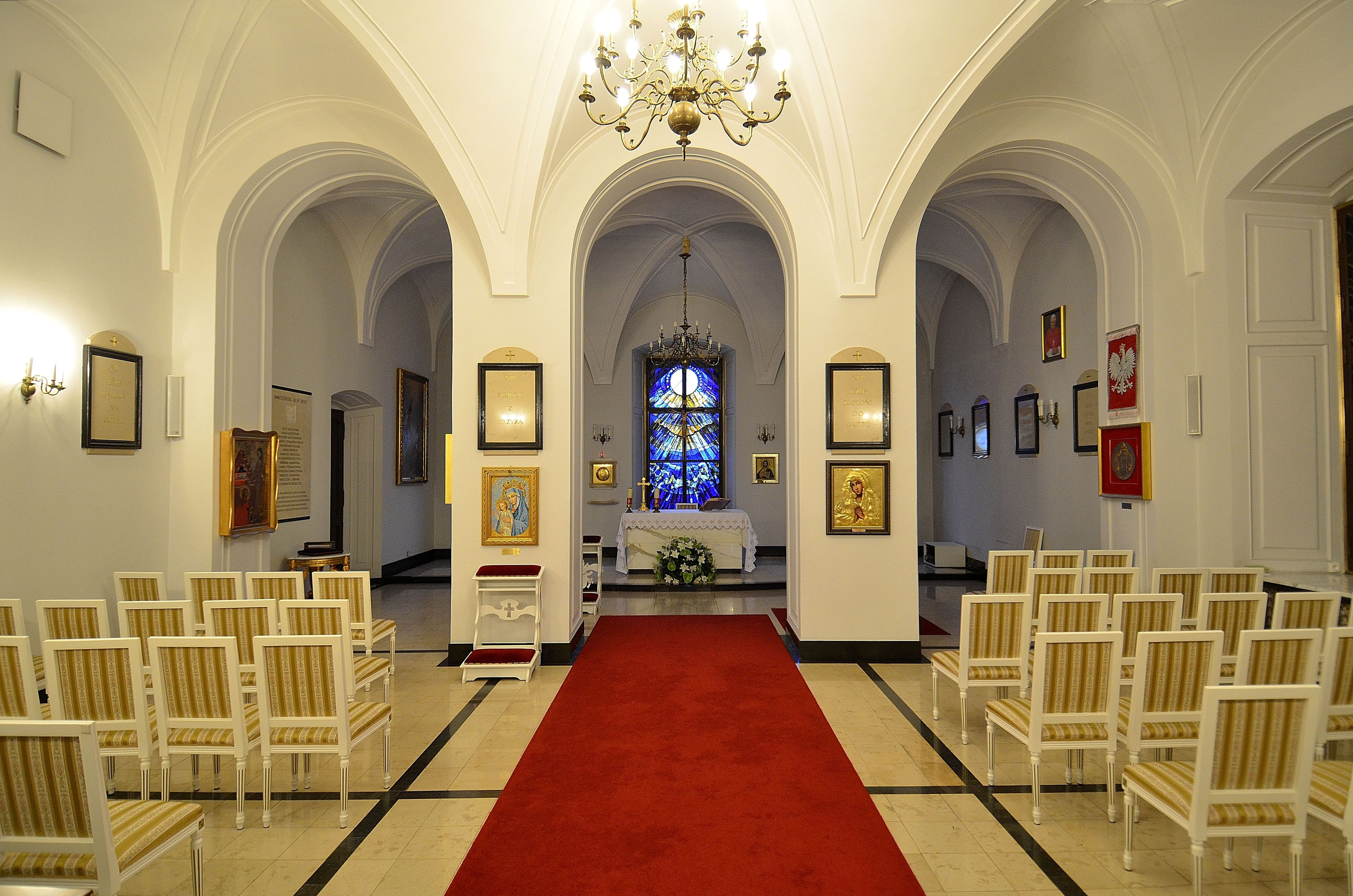
Chapel

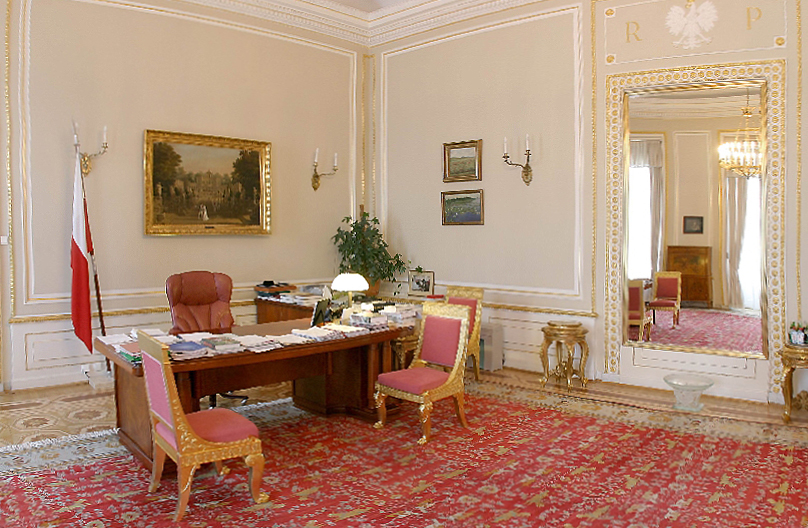
President's Office

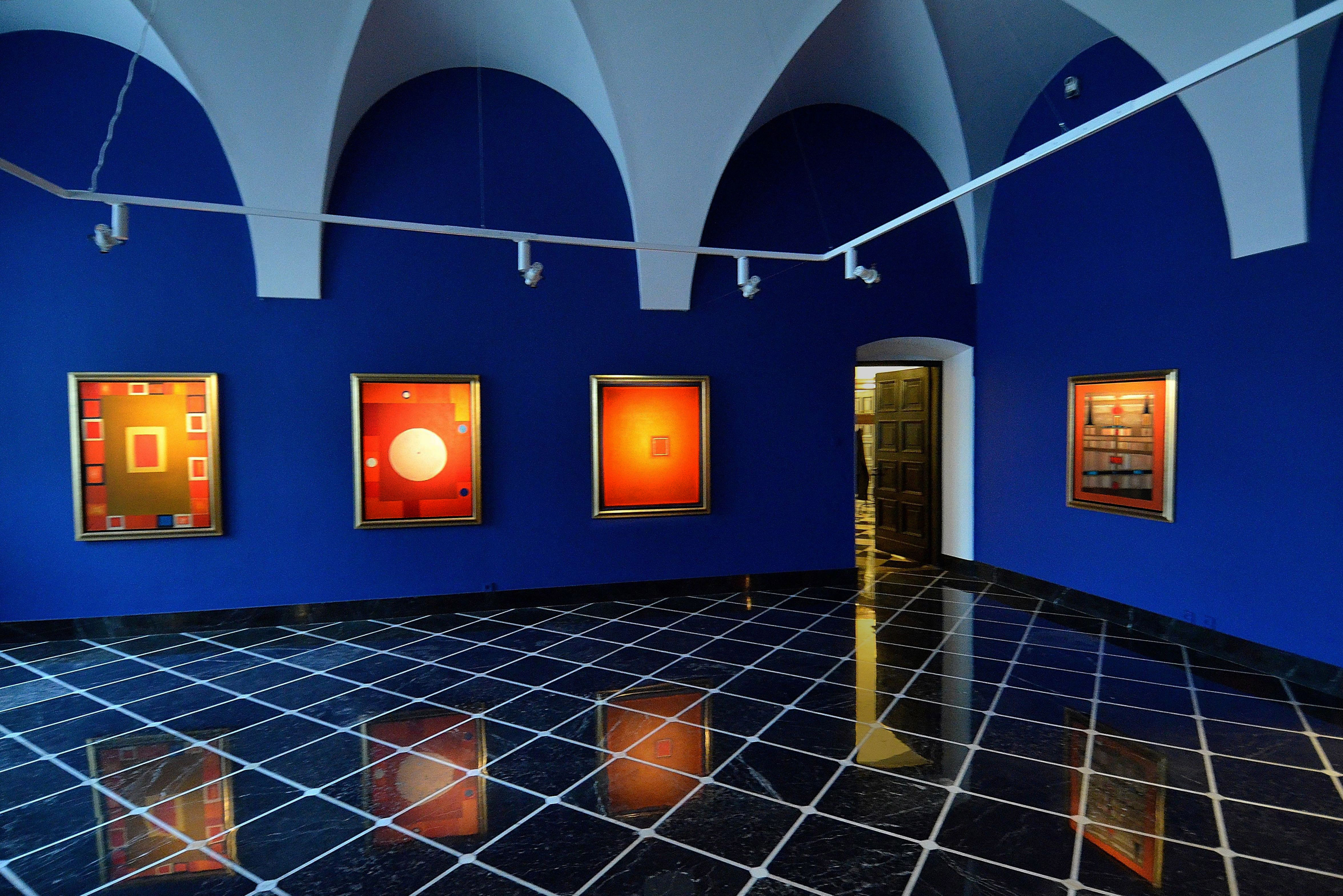
Jerzy Nowosielski Hall

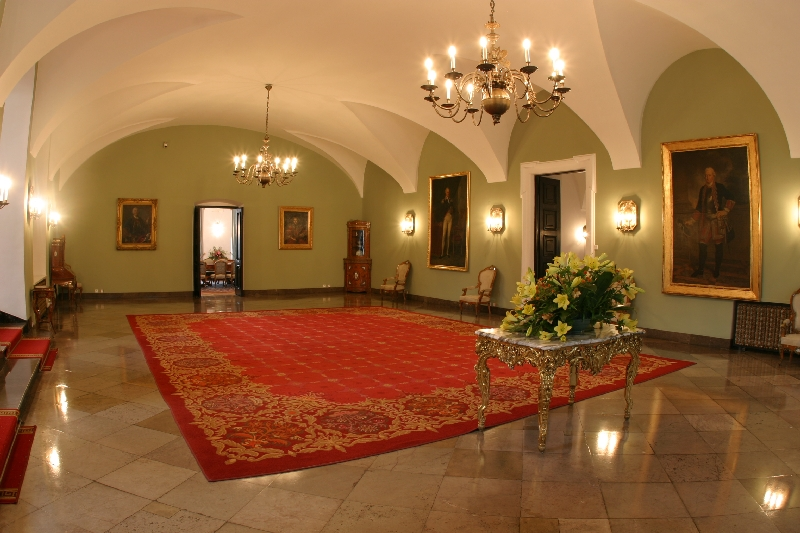
Hetman's Room

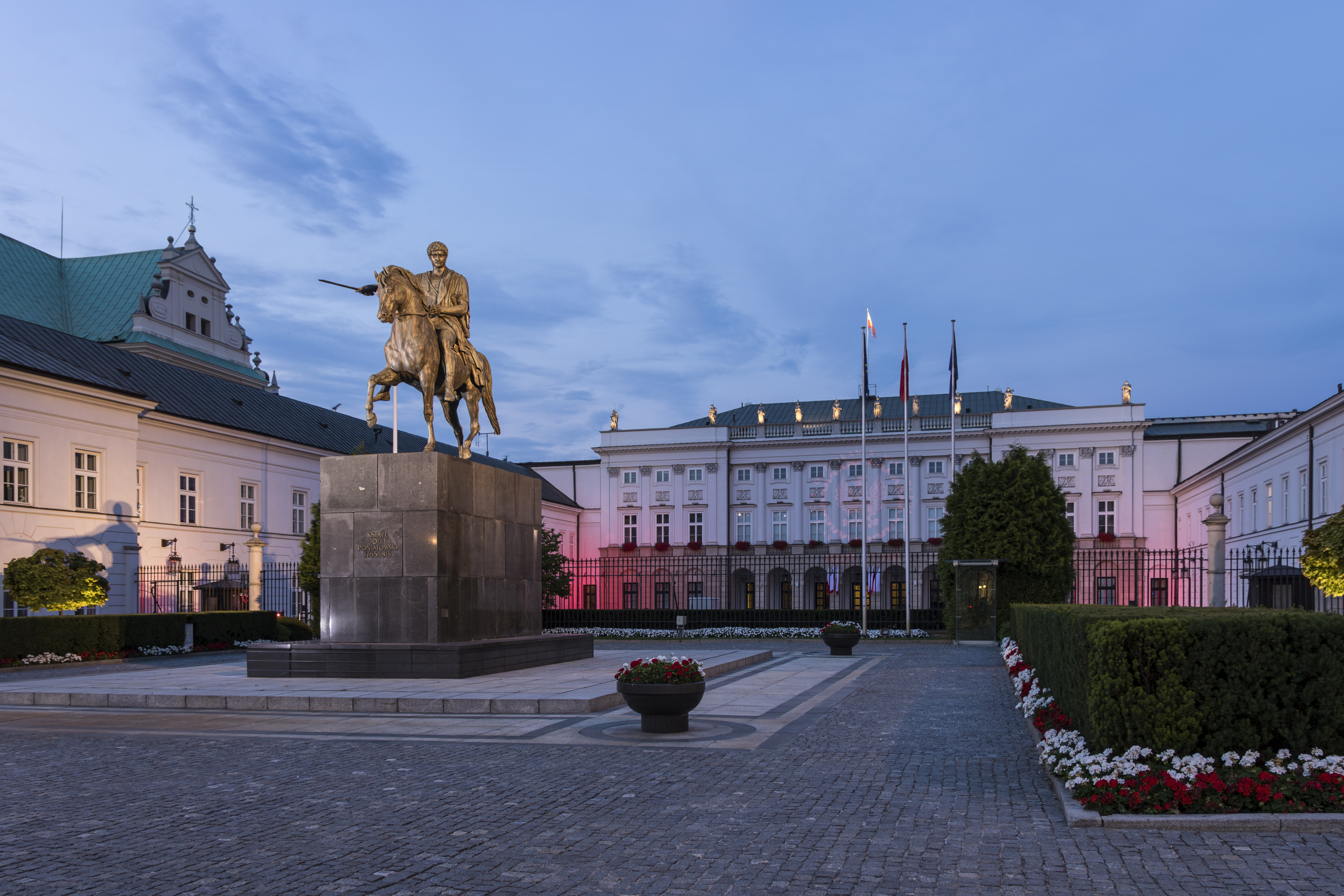
Illumination

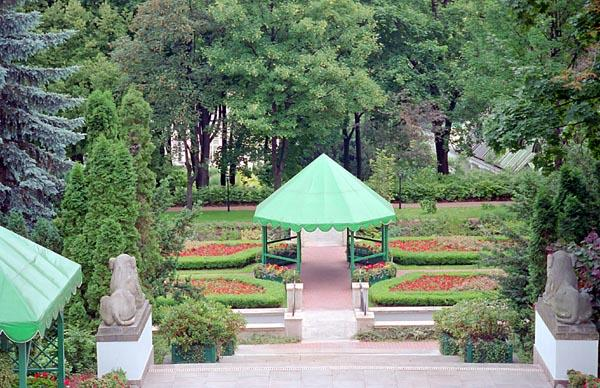
Garden

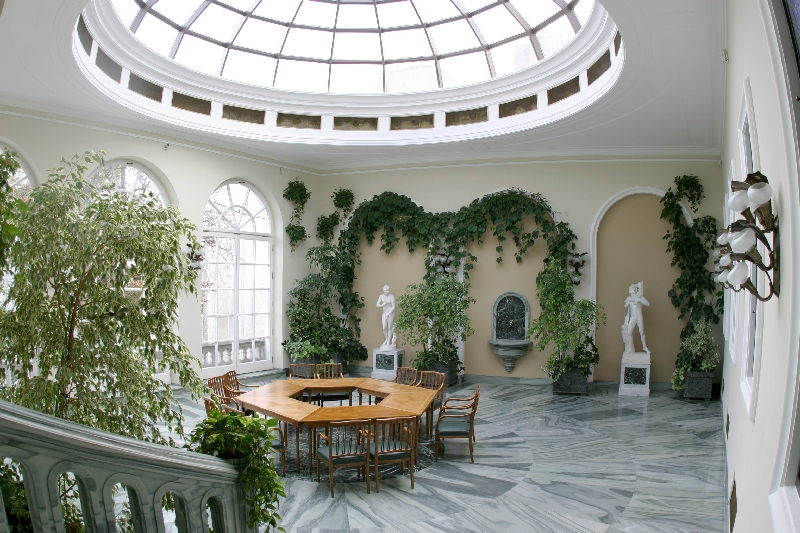
Orangery

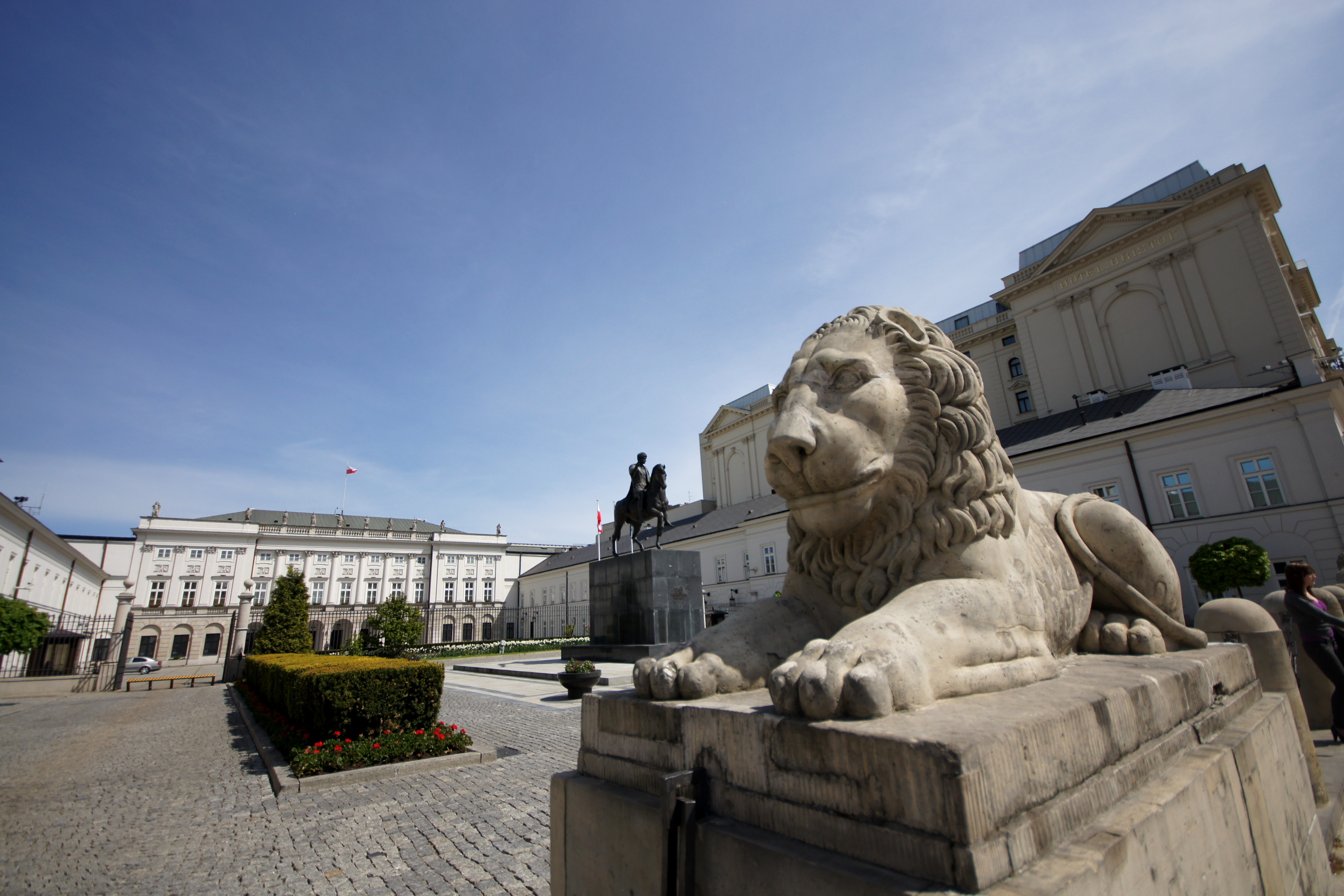
A lion sculpture by Camillo Landini

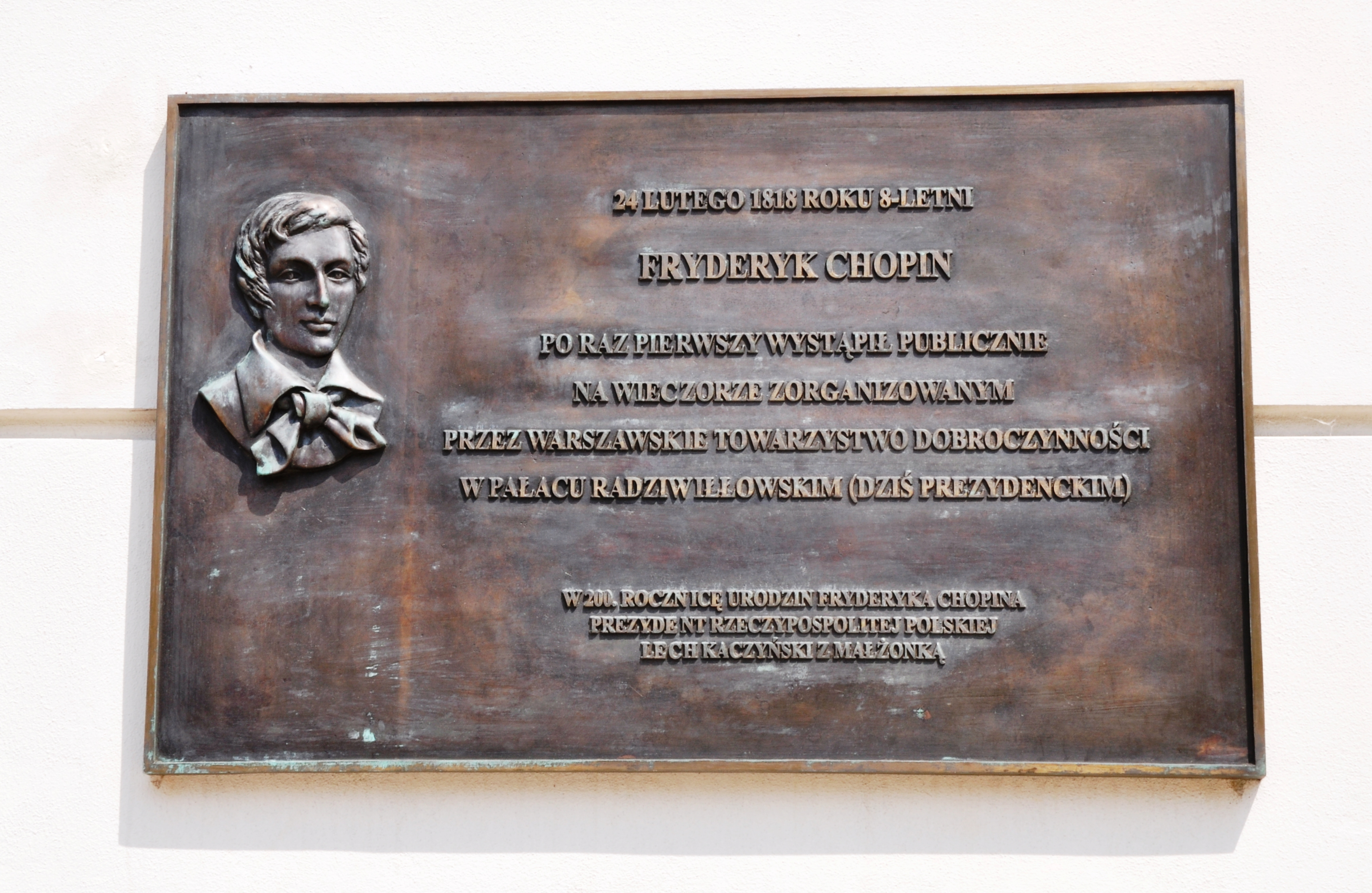
Plaque commemorating Frédéric Chopin's first performance on 24 February 1818

== See also ==
- Presidential Palace cross
- Belweder Palace
- Carmelite Church
- Cross in front of the Presidential Palace in Warsaw
- List of palaces in Poland
- Monument to Prince Józef Poniatowski in Warsaw
- Potocki Palace
