= Marchwicki Palace in Brzeźno =

- Main façade

General information
- Type: Palace
- Architectural style: Neoclassicism
- Location: Brzeźno
- Coordinates: 52.912884°N 21.615261°E
- Completed: c. 1900
- Client: Stanisław Marchwicki

Technical details
- Floor count: 3

Design and construction
- Architect: Leandro Marconi

Marchwicki Palace in Brzeźno is a neoclassical palace in Brzeźno, Ostrołęka County, Poland. Built around 1900 for the Marchwicki family, probably to a design by Leandro Marconi, it is an example of late 19th-century architecture inspired by the classicism of the reign of King Stanislaus Augustus. The palace and its landscape park are protected as a historic monument.

== History ==
The village of Brzeźno was first recorded in 1428, when Wojciech, Jan and Paweł of Brzeźno of the Bolesta coat of arms, were mentioned as landowners. During the 16th century, parts of the estate belonged to the Brzeziński family. In 1564 Paweł Brzeziński sold part of Brzeźno to Hieronim Dzierżanowski and his wife Zofia. The Brzeziński family retained interests in the estate until the 18th century, after which it passed to the Zambrzycki family. By 1826 it belonged to Seweryn Kalisz and his wife Julianna née Pruszkowska.

Before 1848 the estate was acquired by Maciej Marchwicki (c. 1801–1862) and his wife Paulina née Biberstein-Pilichowska (1815–1898). Their sons Zdzisław and Jan participated in the January Uprising of 1863. Zdzisław Marchwicki (1841–1912) served as civil commissioner of Ostrołęka County and subsequently of Płock Governorate. He later settled in Lviv, where he became a banker, politician and deputy mayor.

The palace was constructed around 1900, probably for Stanisław Marchwicki, a grandson of Maciej and son of Zdzisław Marchwicki. The building is generally attributed to Warsaw architect Leandro Marconi. The estate remained in the possession of the Marchwicki family until 1945. Marconi created a palace inspired by Polish classicism of the Stanisław era, particularly the palace in Natolin, as well as the architectural style of the Palace on the Isle in Łazienki Park in Warsaw. A distinctive feature directly borrowed from Natolin, which defines the character of the entire structure, is the elliptically curved grand-order columnar portico crowning an elliptical recess in the front façade that houses the palace’s entrance.

The palace is seven bays wide, two stories tall, built on a rectangular plan with two single-story annexes attached to the side walls, the eastern one supporting a balcony. On the garden side, the façade is adorned with a pentagonal risalit opening onto a terrace.

The palace stands within a landscape park of approximately 3.2 hectares. Its layout includes an oval carriage drive in front of the building and a pond with an artificial wooded island. The park contains mature lime, oak, ash and maple trees. Its origins are generally dated to the 19th century, although some architectural surveys place its creation around 1900.

After World War II, the palace was nationalized and handed over to the local State Agricultural Farm. It underwent renovation in 1965. Following the political transformation, the palace became the property of the State Treasury. In 2006, it was purchased by a private owner and underwent a major renovation.
