= Brzeźno, Masovian Voivodeship =

Brzeźno
- Village
- Location within Poland
- Coordinates: 52°54′13″N 21°36′04″E
- Country: Poland
- Voivodeship: Masovian
- County: Ostrołęka
- Gmina: Goworowo

Brzeźno [ˈbʐɛʑnɔ] is a village in the administrative district of Gmina Goworowo, within Ostrołęka County, Masovian Voivodeship, in east-central Poland.

In the center of the village there is a built in 1900 the Marchwicki Palace with a landscape park.
