= Łazienki Park =

Largest park in Warsaw, Poland

Coordinates: 52°12′46″N 21°01′58″E

Royal Baths
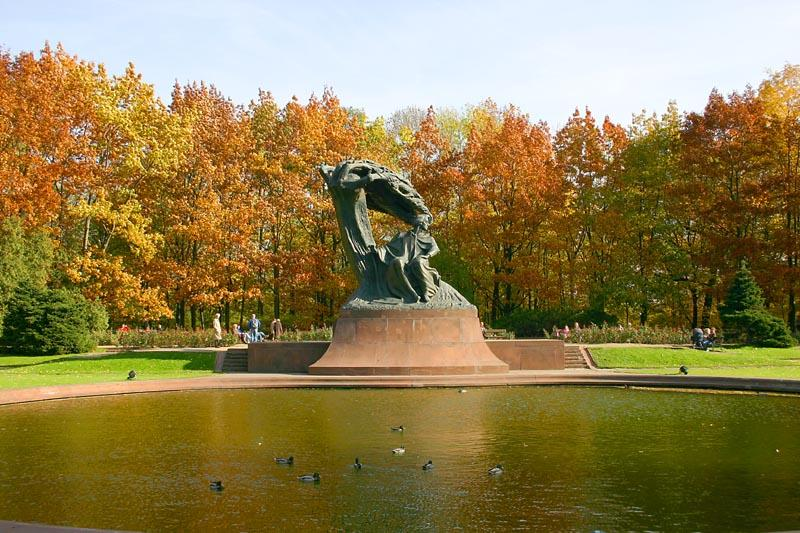
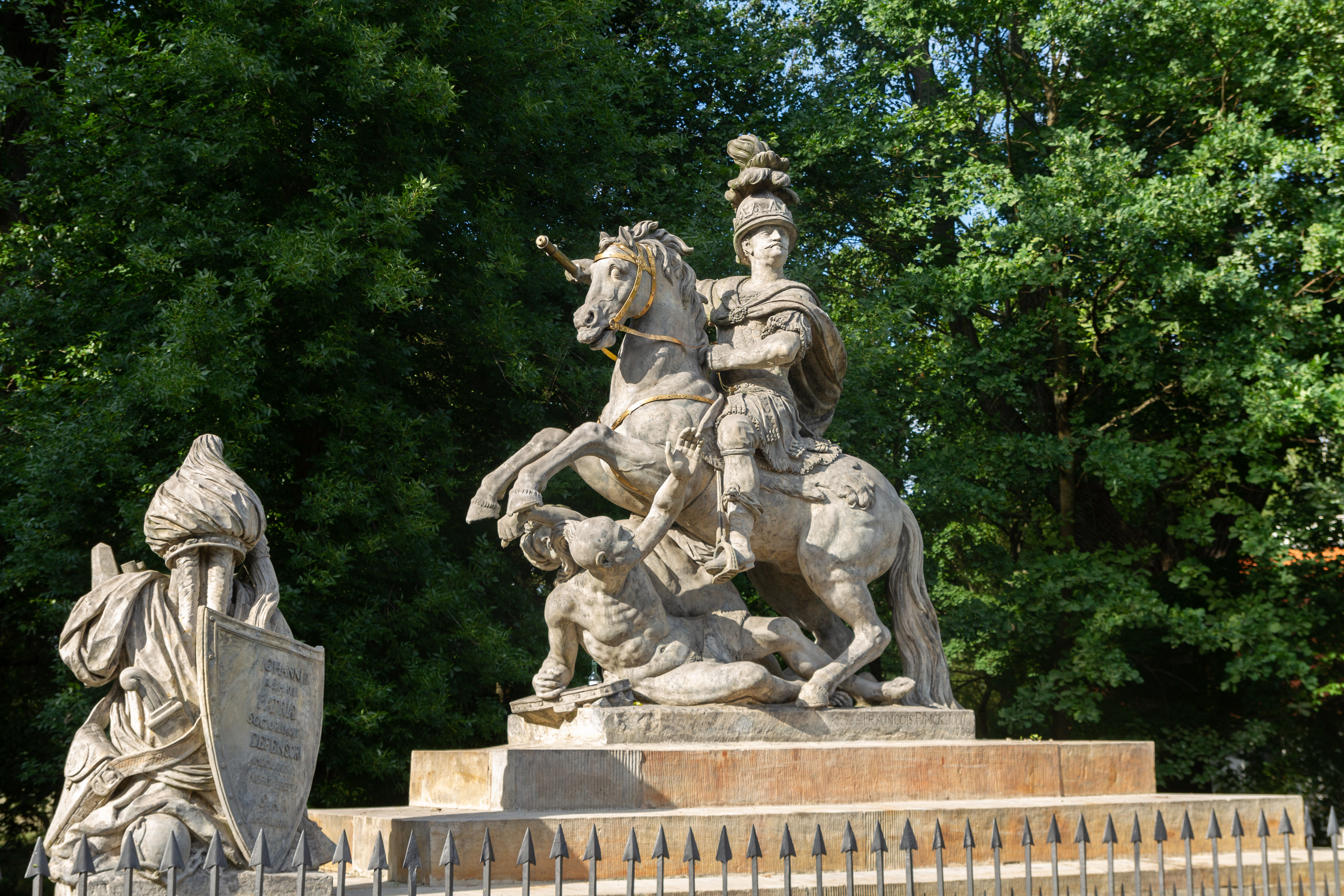
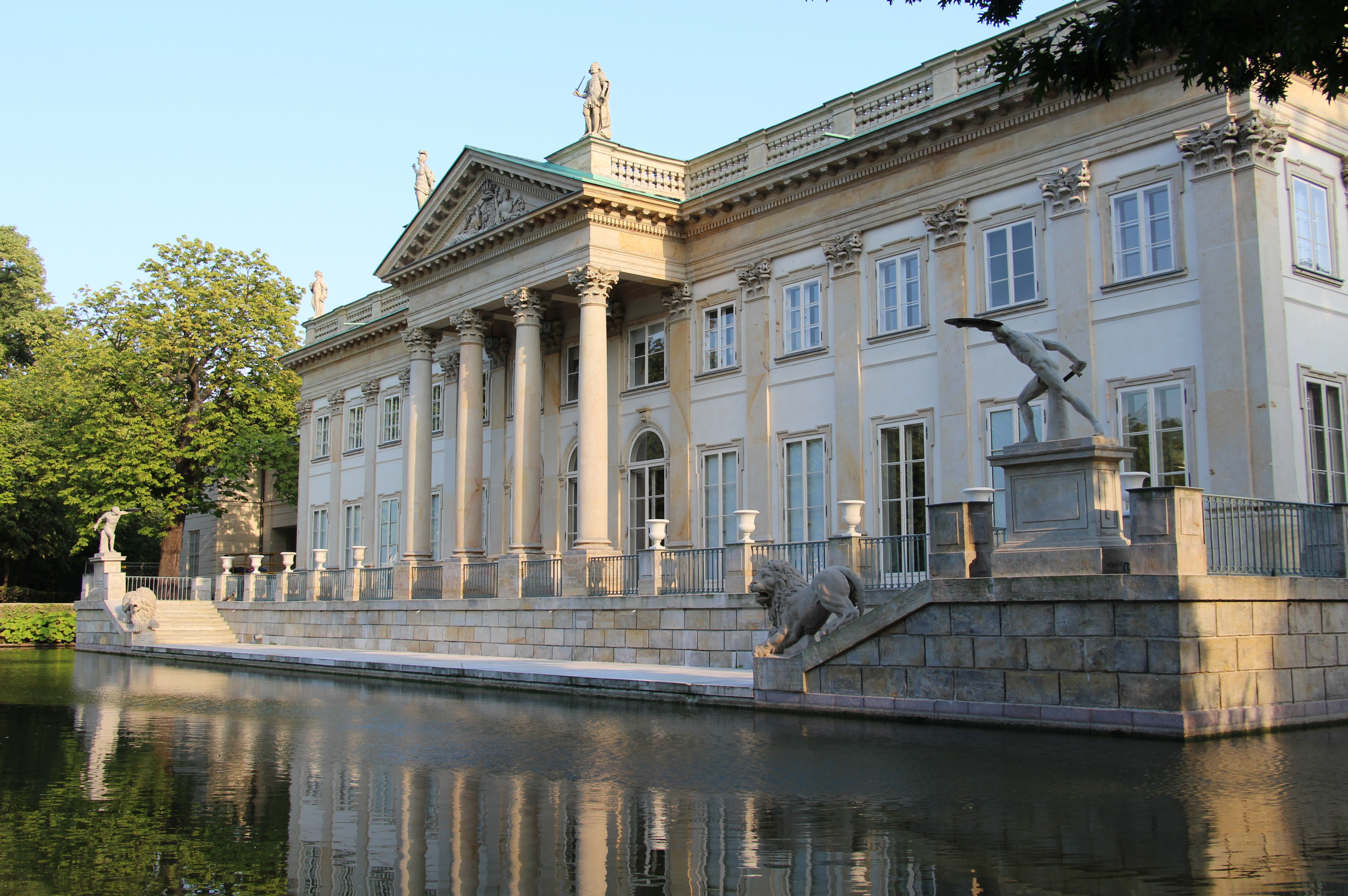
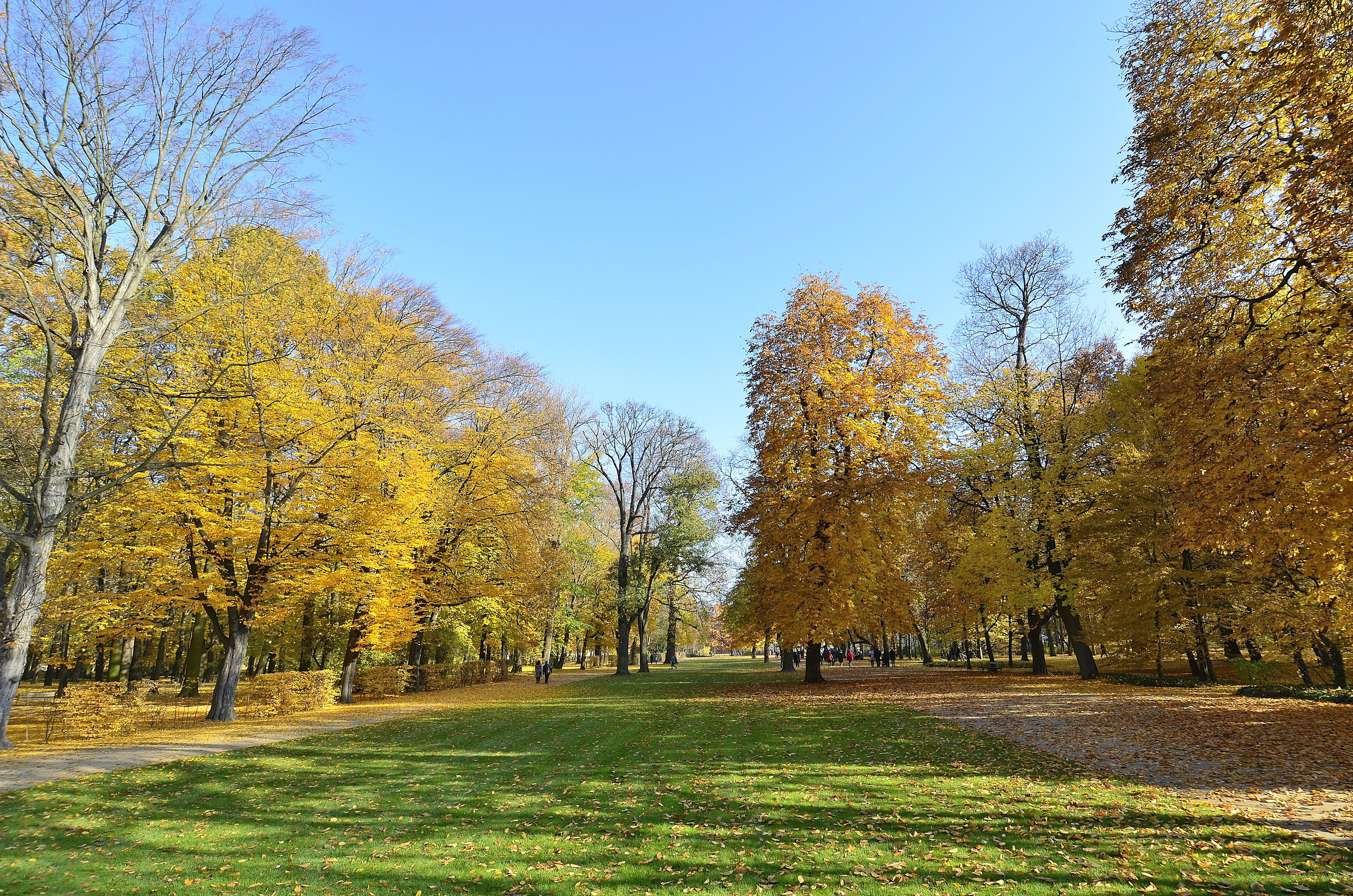
- Chopin monument (top left), Monument to John III Sobieski (top right), Palace on the Isle (bottom left) and Central Promenade (bottom right).
- Interactive map of Royal Baths
- Type: Municipal
- Location: Warsaw
- Area: 76 ha
- Created: 1918
- Status: Open all year
- Public transit: Łazienki Królewskie, Plac na Rozdrożu

Łazienki Park, or the Royal Baths Park (Polish pronunciation: [waˈʑɛnkʲi kruˈlɛvskʲjɛ], Polish: Park Łazienkowski, Łazienki Królewskie), is the largest park in Warsaw, Poland, occupying 76 hectares of the city center. The park-and-palace complex lies in the Downtown district, on Ujazdów Avenue, which is part of the Royal Route linking the Royal Castle with Wilanów Palace to the south.

In the mid-16th century the Łazienki area became part of the estates of Queen Bona Sforza, who ordered the construction of a wooden manor house with an Italian garden. In 1624 King Sigismund III Vasa erected, north of the present Łazienki Park, the quadrilateral stone Ujazdów Castle.

Most of the Łazienki Park buildings were originally designed in the 17th century by Tylman van Gameren in the Baroque style for military commander Stanisław Herakliusz Lubomirski, including an ornate bathing pavilion that eventually gave its name to the gardens. In 1764 King Stanisław II August obtained Ujazdów and extensively remodeled the gardens. In 1918, following Poland's resumption of independence, Łazienki was officially designated a public park.

The park's flora and fauna include over 9,500 trees and populations of peafowl and red squirrels. Bordering the park's southern side is the Belweder, a historic palace and now one of the official residences of the President of Poland.

== History ==
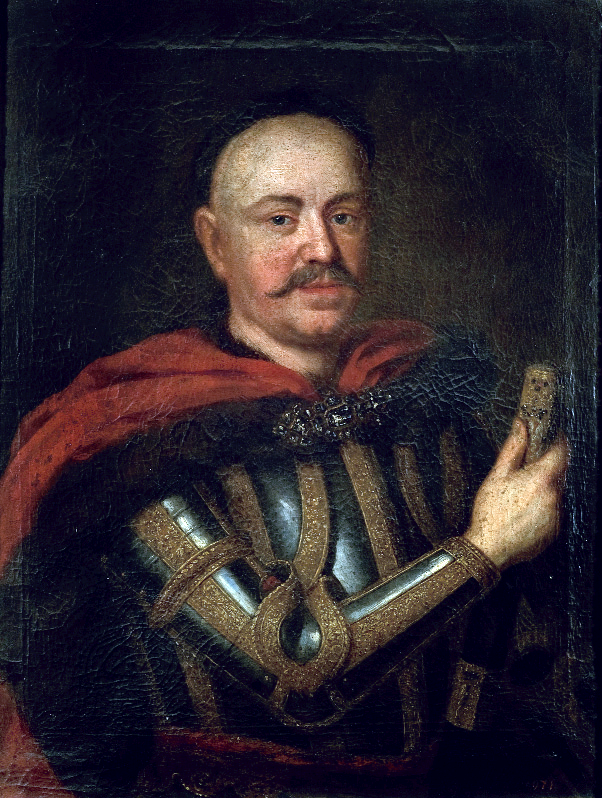
Stanisław Herakliusz Lubomirski (1642–1702)

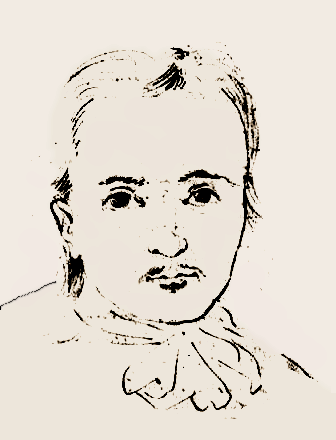
Tylman van Gameren (1632–1706)

Łazienki Park was designed in the 17th century by Tylman van Gameren, in the baroque style, for military commander Stanisław Herakliusz Lubomirski. It took the name Łazienki ("Baths") from a bathing pavilion that was located nearby.

The picturesque garden scheme owes its emergence as its present shape and appearance mainly to the last ruler of the Polish–Lithuanian Commonwealth, King Stanisław August Poniatowski (Stanislaus II Augustus). In the mid-16th century, it became part of the estates of Poland's Italian-born Queen Bona Sforza, who built a wooden manor house with an Italian garden on this site. Later, the wooden manor house of Queen Anna Jagiellon stood on this spot, immortalized in 1578 by the performance of the first Polish play, Dismissal of the Greek Envoys by Jan Kochanowski. To the south, King Sigismund III Vasa had a four-sided stone castle with corner towers erected in 1624.

In the second half of the 17th century, Ujazdów became the property of Grand Crown Marshal Stanisław Herakliusz Lubomirski. He was the first to call attention to the thickly wooded area of a former animal park stretching along the foot of Ujazdów Castle where he built two garden pavilions. The first pavilion was a hermitage and the other originally contained an ornate bath chamber which first gave its name to the building and eventually to the entire garden. The original baths designed by the renowned architect Tylman van Gameren in the Baroque style, are contained to this day within the walls of the Palace on the Isle. In the first half of the 18th century, Ujazdów was leased to King Augustus II the Strong, during whose reign a regular waterway known as the Piaseczno Canal was built.

In 1764, Ujazdów became the property of King Stanisław II Augustus. The monarch first set about rebuilding Ujazdów Castle which he chose as his summer residence. Work was begun in the castle's forefield, where a series of straight paths converging at circles was laid out. The remodelling of the old Ujazdów Castle, which received an additional storey and new wings, dragged on without producing the expected results. The king became discouraged, abandoned further work and shifted his attention to the surrounding gardens.

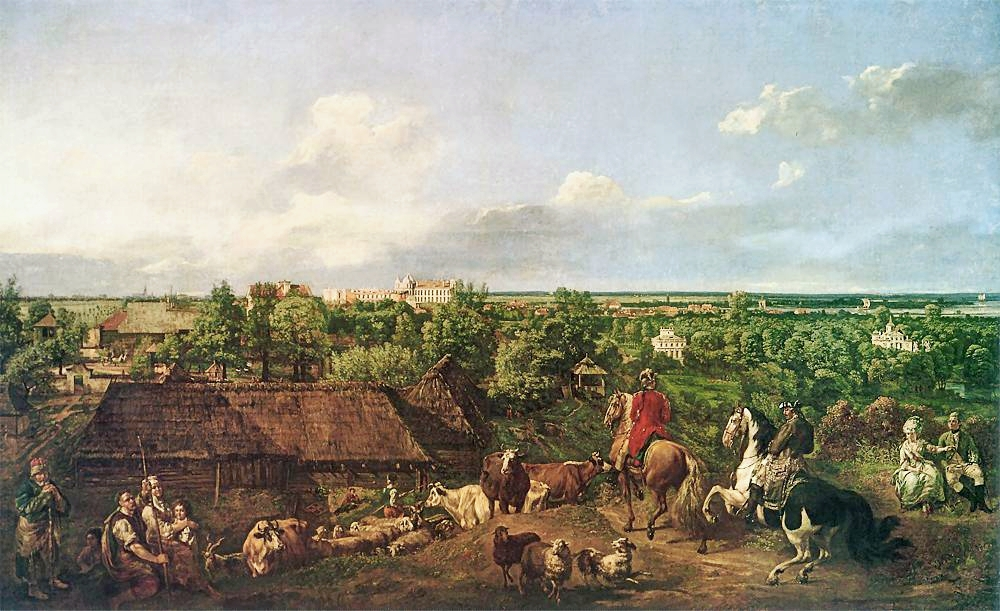
View of the park and Ujazdów Castle from the surrounding countryside. The baths were initially established in a rural country forest. Painting by Bernardo Bellotto, 1776

Modified and reconstructed in several stages over two decades beginning in 1772, the former Lubomirski Bath-House was eventually transformed into the elegant classicist Palace on the Isle. Throughout the gardens, many new structures were built and adorned by architects Dominik Merlini and Jan Chrystian Kamsetzer, painters Jan Bogumił Plersch and Marcello Bacciarelli, and sculptors Andrzej Le Brun, Jakub Monaldi, and Franciszek Pinek. In 1774 a White House was erected in the form of a simple hexagon with comfortably appointed interiors. According to legend, the king's mistress, Elżbieta Grabowska, as well as his sisters resided in the manor. From 1775 to 1783 the Myślewicki Palace was built opposite the Bath-House. Originally it took the form of a cube built on a square, to which eventually wings were built on and subsequently elevated. During the 1770s the hermitage, which had been damaged by lightning, was restored and one of the king's companions, Teresa Lhullier, took up residence there.

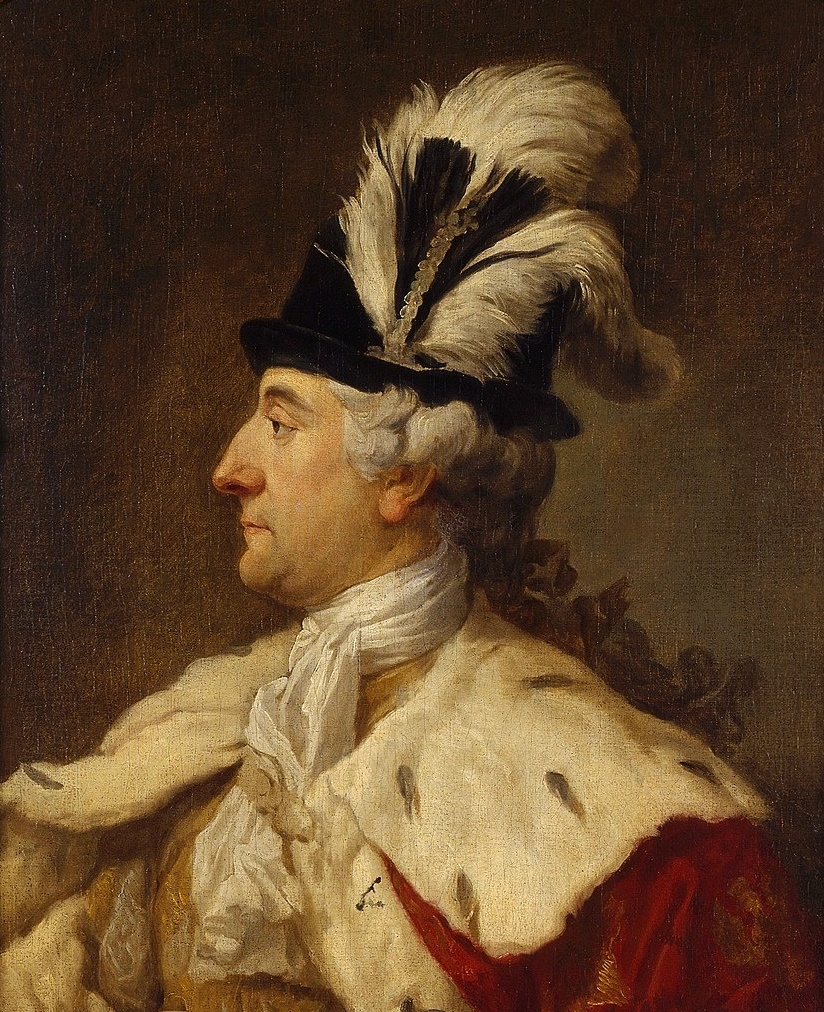
Stanisław II Augustus transformed the baths into a renowned park with palaces and temples. Painting by Bacciarelli.

Gradually, the gardens also changed their appearance. In 1778, a Royal Promenade was laid out – a lane joining the White House to the Bath-House. At the point where it crossed the Wilanów Road, a one-storey Chinese-style summer house (subsequently dismantled in the 19th century and recently reconstructed) was erected. The old canals and pool near the Bath House were transformed into diversely shaped ponds of considerable size. In addition to gardens geometrically laid out in the French manner, the park also contained scenic areas inspired by the romantic English garden. Near the Royal Promenade a small pavilion meant for then a popular game called Trou Madame was built, later converted into a theatre. Directly opposite, on the southern shore of the pond, an earthen amphitheatre with a stage in a cluster of trees was established. The view from the Bath House to the south was closed off with a water cascade and to the north – with a stone bridge upon which a monument to King John III Sobieski stands to this day. The Grand Annexe of considerable size contained the extensive premises of the royal kitchen as well as lodgings for officials and servants quarters. Exotic fruit was grown in the Old Orangery, which was frequently visited by guests.

By then, the royal complex also included the baroque Belvedere Palace situated at the southern edge of the escarpment. In one of the wings, the king set up a faience factory whose products were known as Belvedere vessels. Whenever Stanisław Augustus visited Łazienki, he was followed by his entire court and closest family members. Decorative tents were set up in the garden to accommodate mainly all the servants and guards. At such times, the park was filled with strolling couples, people in carriages and small boats or gondolas. Colourful and raucous spectacles including firework displays and other illuminations were staged in the gardens and often attended by the citizens of Warsaw. Such was the case when a magnificent carousel was set into motion to mark the unveiling of the King John III Sobieski monument in 1788.

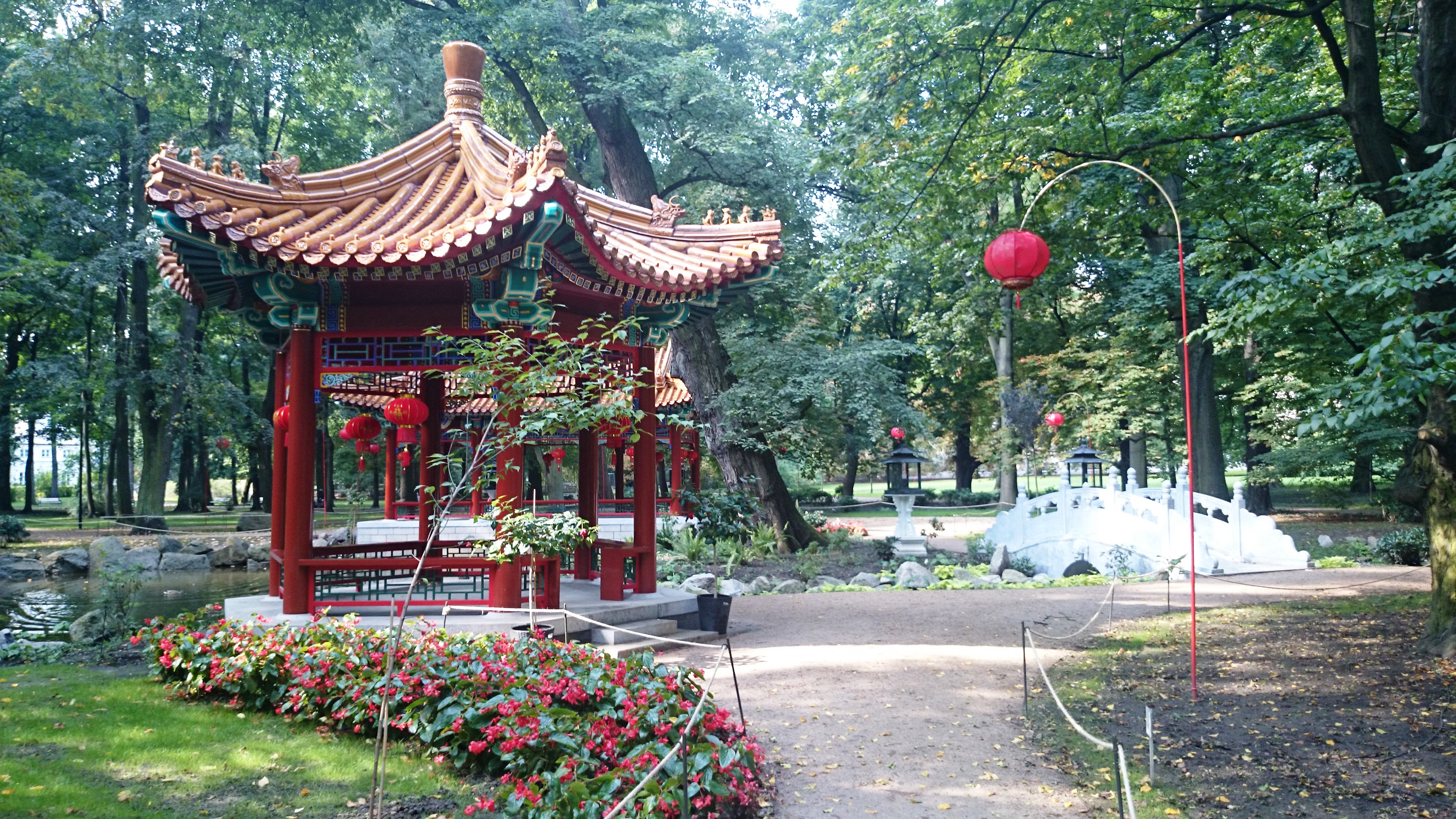
Chinese garden and pagoda

The Palace on the Isle was the scene of the famous Thursday Lunches, to which the king would invite scholars, writers and poets. Łazienki at that time was an important cultural centre that flourished thanks to the support of Stanislaus Augustus, a patron of the fine arts and propagator of science and learning. As a palace and garden complex, Łazienki reflected the classicist style widespread in Europe during the latter half of the 18th century. But it stood for its picturesque nature and variety, hence that classicism (also found in the interiors of Ujazdów Castle designed by the King) has come to be known as the style of Stanislaus Augustus.

Following the partitions of Poland, in the 19th century, Łazienki fell into the hands of the Russian tsars. In the period from 1819 to 1830, at the request of the new owners architect Jakub Kubicki rebuilt the Belvedere in the late-classicist style and subsequently erected new pavilions in the gardens – the Egyptian Temple and Temple of Diana. He converted the former Trou Madame pavilion into a new guardhouse and a school, hence today it is best known as Podchorążówka (Cadets’ Hall).

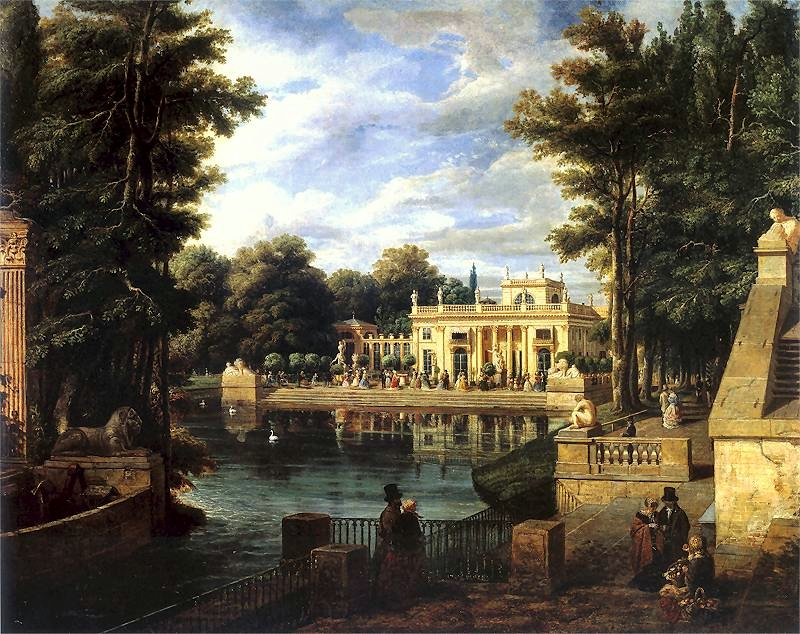
View of the Baths in summer, by Marcin Zaleski, 1836-1838

The Nazi occupation was a tragic period for Łazienki. In 1939 it was closed to Poles and the historic buildings were taken over by the German military. Towards the end of December 1944, before evacuating the palace, the Nazis drenched its walls with petrol and set the complex on fire. In the building's blackened walls they drilled some one thousand holes to place the dynamite in order to blow it up the way they had Warsaw's Royal Castle but ultimately they were unable to do so.

Following the Second World War, an arduous reconstruction project of the Łazienki royal complex, which was to last nearly two decades, got underway. The first seven ground floor chambers of the palace was opened to the public in 1960 and in 1965 the entire first floor. Fortunately, the White House, Myślewicki Palace and the theatre in the old orangery were spared from any severe destruction during the war. Nevertheless, they required thorough restoration, since they did sustain damage. At present they are completely renovated and open to visitors. Also restored are the Amphitheatre, Waterworks and the Cadets' Hall which recently became the home of the Ignacy Jan Paderewski Museum. This historic palace and garden complex, now situated in the city centre, performs various cultural functions and is regularly visited by a great many domestic and foreign excursions as well as Varsovians.

== Structures in the park ==
=== Palace on the Isle ===
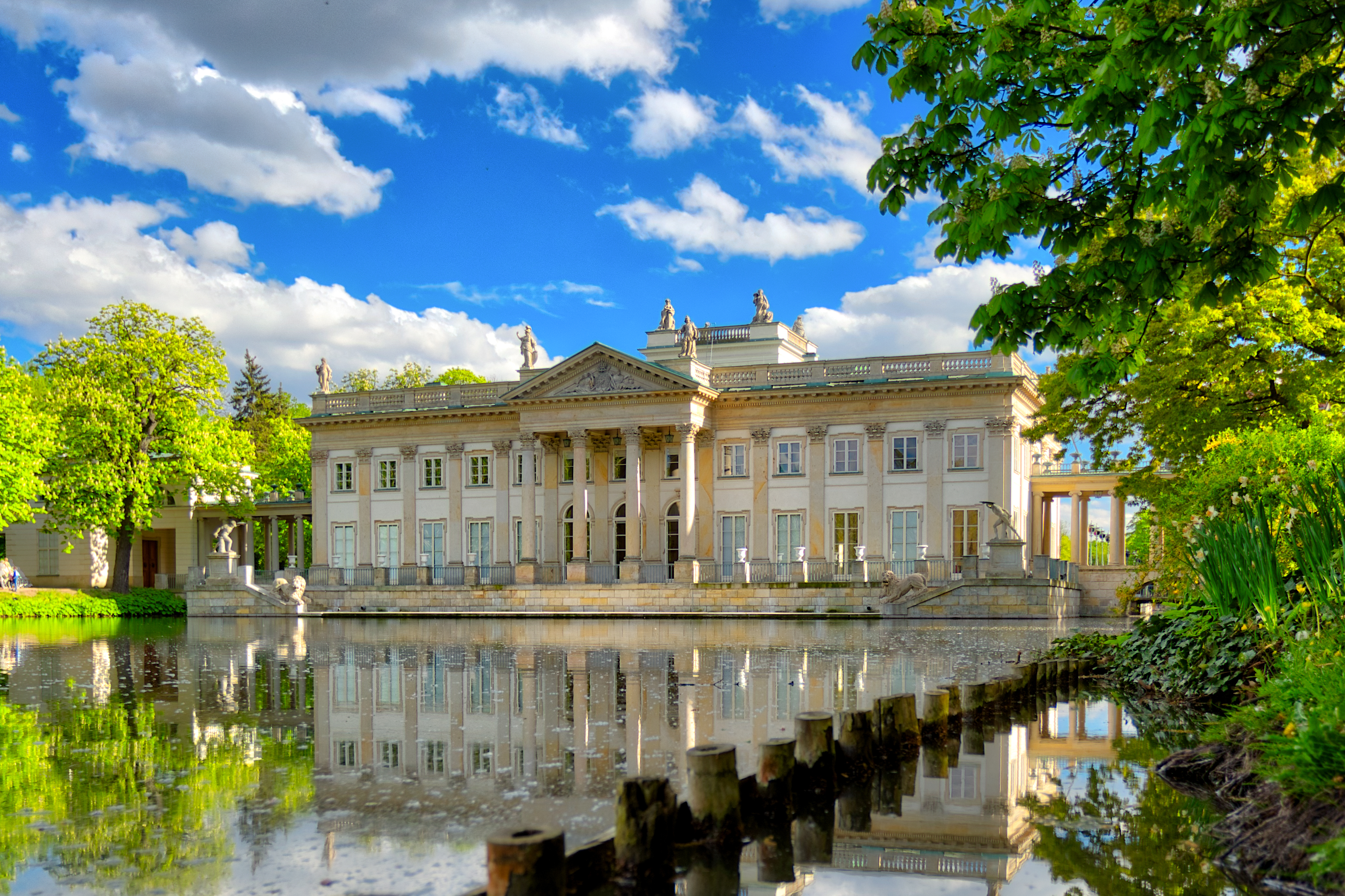
Rear (north) façade

The principal edifice of Łazienki is the Palace on the Isle (Polish: Pałac Na Wyspie). It was originally a baroque Bath-House erected in about 1680 by Lubomirski according to the design of Tylman van Gameren, the most outstanding architect in Poland at that time. The square-shaped structure had a three-side protrusion on its northern elevation. Inside was a round hall with a fountain and the hall was topped by a cupola illuminated from above by lanterns. The walls were studded with pebbles, seashells and imitated grotto. Adjoining it was a bath chamber with walls adorned by bas-reliefs. Both the building's interior as well as its exterior elevation were richly decorated with stucco, sculptures and murals. A portion of the original decorations survived on the entrance wall of the columned portico. Also original is the Latin inscription to be read as a rebus. In translation, it states: "This house hates sorrow, loves peace, offers a bath, recommends an idyllic life and wishes to play host to honest men."

To a large extent, the decorations of the main entrance hall, the Chamber of Bacchus and the Bath-Chamber all dating from Lubomirski's time, had survived. King Stanisław August first took an interest in the old Bath-House in 1772. Initially some of the interiors were restored and turned into living quarters. That coincided with a fashion for vacating palatial mansions for secluded rural abodes. The first substantive change to the Bath-House's appearance occurred in 1777: a second story was added, with sleeping quarters for King Stanislaus Augustus. Downstairs a dining-room was created which already had a classicist appearance. Fashionable roofed Chinese galleries with little bridges were added at both sides, with the western one leading to what soon would be the Royal Promenade. In 1784, a more extensive reconstruction of the Bath-House was launched according to a design by Dominik Merlini. Two new annexes were built on the southern side, joined by a row of four columns. The classicist façade was covered with sandstone slabs. Four years later two new segments slightly set back from the south were added on both sides. On the northern side, they formed part of the new, monumental northern façade which featured a columned portico crowned by a triangular tympanum. The entire elevation was crowned with a stone attic embellished with sculptures by André-Jean Lebrun.

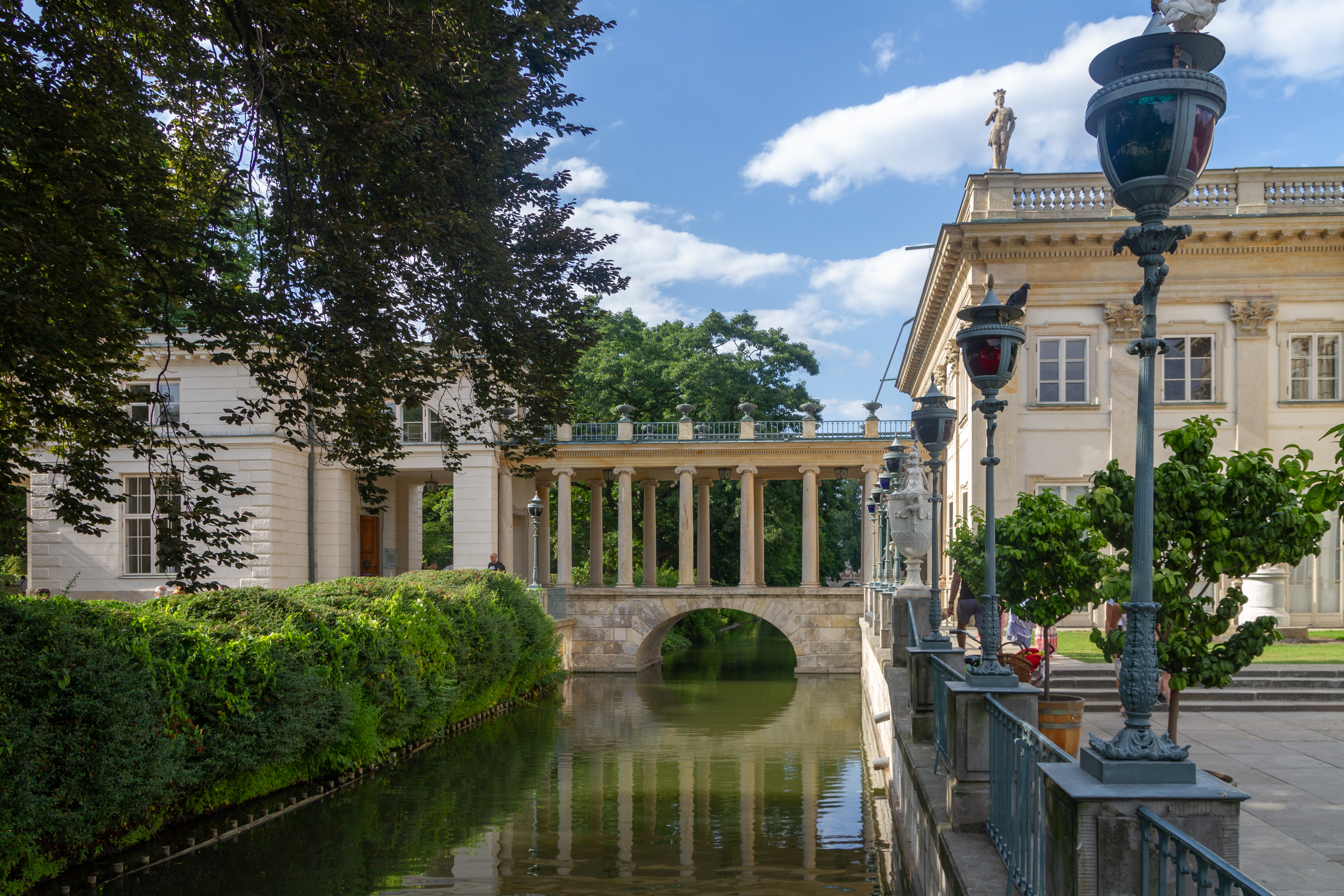
Bridge over canal leading to palace

In 1793, two additional pavilions were constructed. They were joined to the palace by little bridges with columned galleries. Despite the numerous reconstructions over the years, the edifice had remained as a harmonious whole. But what started as a simple bathing pavilion had been transformed into a lavish palace. The exterior changes were accompanied by work on the interiors, most of which were given a classicist-style appearance.

A completely new interior, in the western segment added in 1788, was the two-tiered Ballroom with decorations designed by Jan Chrystian Kamsetzer. Completed in 1793, it constituted an outstanding example of the classicist style in Poland. The stuccowork and mural decorations were subordinated to architectural divisions. The axis of the composition was set off by two monumental marble fireplaces in the form of wall porticoes, featuring statues of Apollo and Farnesian Heracles set against the shorter walls. The longer, white marbled walls decorated by vertical panneaux, painted by Jan Bogumił Plersh in the style of Raphael's grotesques in the Vatican. Gold was the dominant colour in all chambers, especially in Solomon's Hall. The plafond, bed-mouldings and both longer walls were filled with paintings by Marcello Bacciarelli illustrating the life of King Solomon. It was also during the time that the interior of the former baroque grotto at the centre of the building was changed into something exceptionally monumental and serious. The walls were stuccoed in gold, grey and white and were divided with half-columns (between which neighbouring premises were entered) as well as four niches containing the marble statues of the greatest Polish monarchs: Casimir III the Great, Stefan Batory, Sigismund III and John III Sobieski. The cupola contained four tondi painted by Bacciarelli symbolizing the four virtues exemplified by the monarchs: courage, wisdom, justice and mercy. They concealed (in 1795) earlier frescos by Plersch illustrating the times of the day which had been in keeping with the interior's previous climate.

Among the other ground-floor chambers is also the portrait room and the considerably bigger picture gallery with paintings collected over time by kings and queens. A small chapel was also erected on the ground floor. It was topped with an oval cupola and the walls were divided by pilasters and panels covered with multi-coloured stucco. The first floor consists of a suite and study, the picture gallery, a royal bedroom, library and the quarters of some servants.

=== Classical amphitheater, and stage on the isle ===
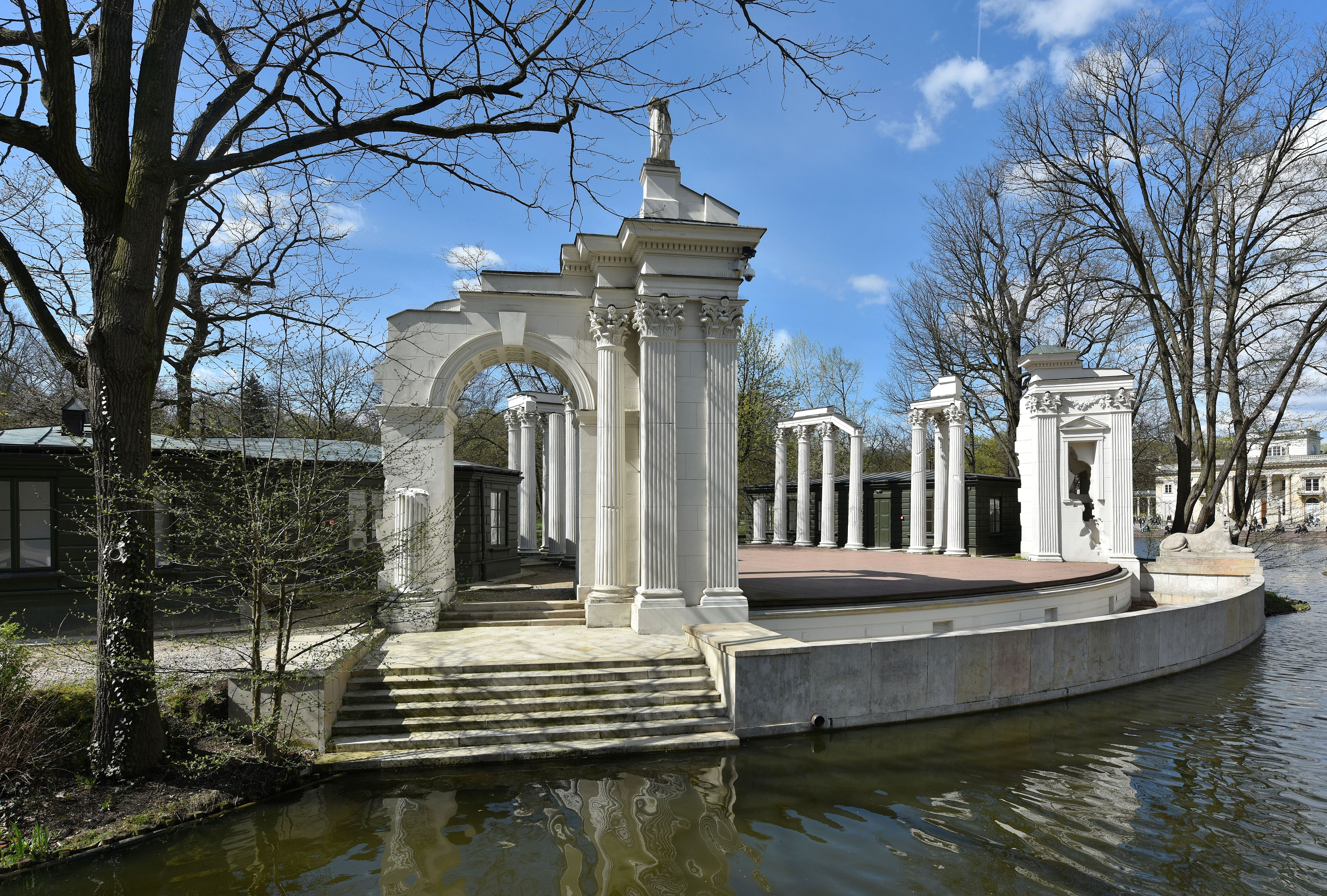
Classical-theater isle stage

The classical amphitheater, inspired by ancient Greek and Roman architecture, was built on the bank of the Łazienki lake, separated by a narrow strait from its stage on a small isle. The amphitheater was built in 1790–93 by Jan Chrystian Kamsetzer. Its attic was embellished with 16 statues representing famous poets, playwrights, and thinkers of antiquity and of the 16th-17th centuries. In 1922 the 16 statues were replaced by 8 statues.

The stage, sited on an isle, was modeled after ancient Herculaneum and features decorations imitating ruins in the Roman Forum. Performances are still staged on the isle. The amphitheater and its stage provide a perfect setting on a summer evening, despite occasional noise from the swans, ducks, and especially the eerily hooting peacocks.

=== White House ===
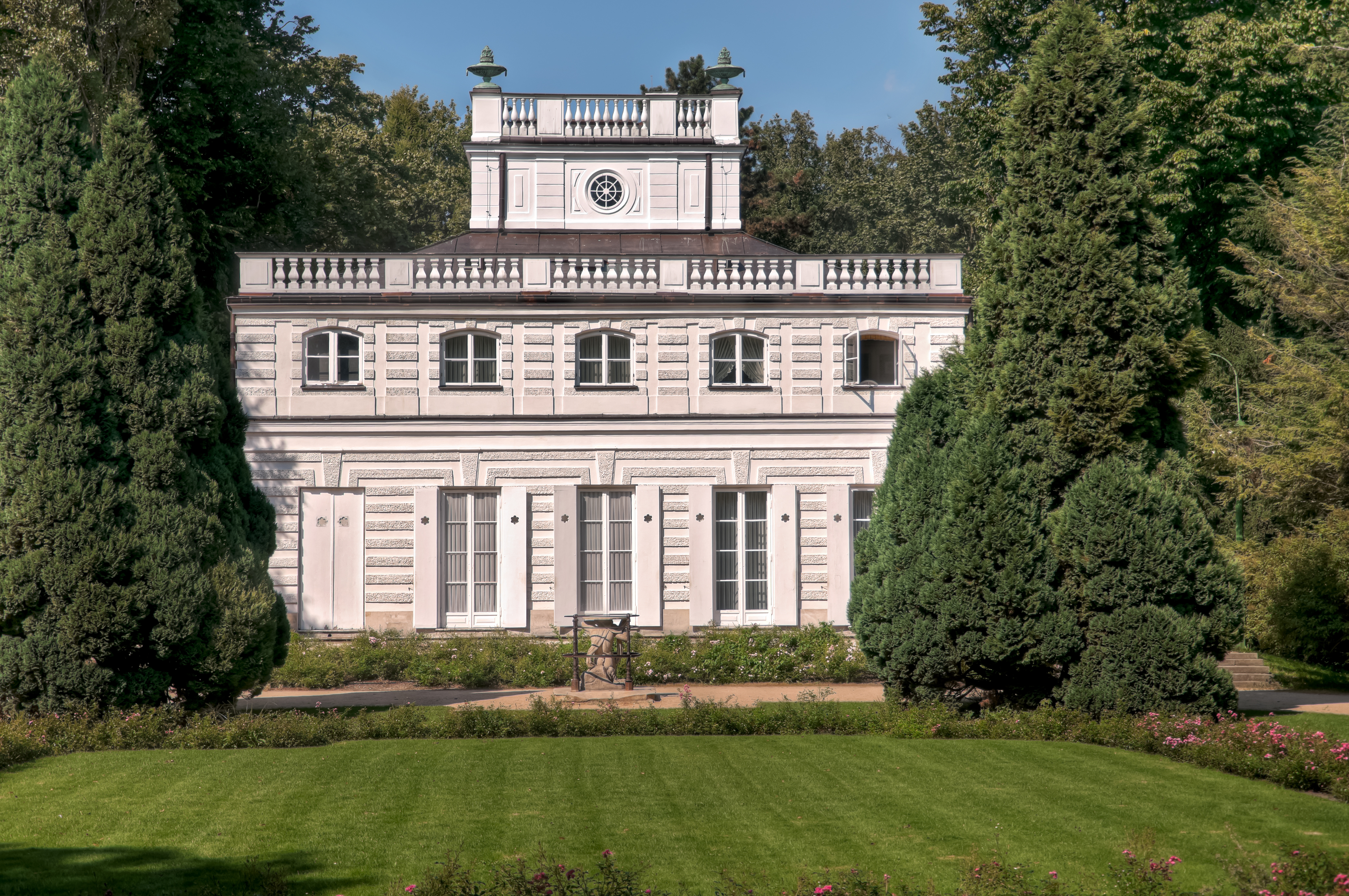
White House

The White House (Biały Dom) is a garden villa built in 1774-76 by Domenico Merlini. It housed King Poniatowski's mistress and, for a time, Louis XVIII, who lived here in 1801-05 during his exile from France. Built in the form of a square, it has identical facades, adorned with rustication, an attic and a small pavilion at the top. The interiors were decorated by the prominent Polish painters Jan Ścisło and Jan Bogumił Plersch.

Though the White House was devastated by the Germans during World War II, many of its interior furnishings survived. The most interesting include grotesque paintings in the dining room, 18th-century Chinese wallpaper in the parlor, the king's bed in the bedchamber, and a cabinet in the form of an arbor with trompe-l'œil paintings by Plersch.

=== Myślewicki Palace ===
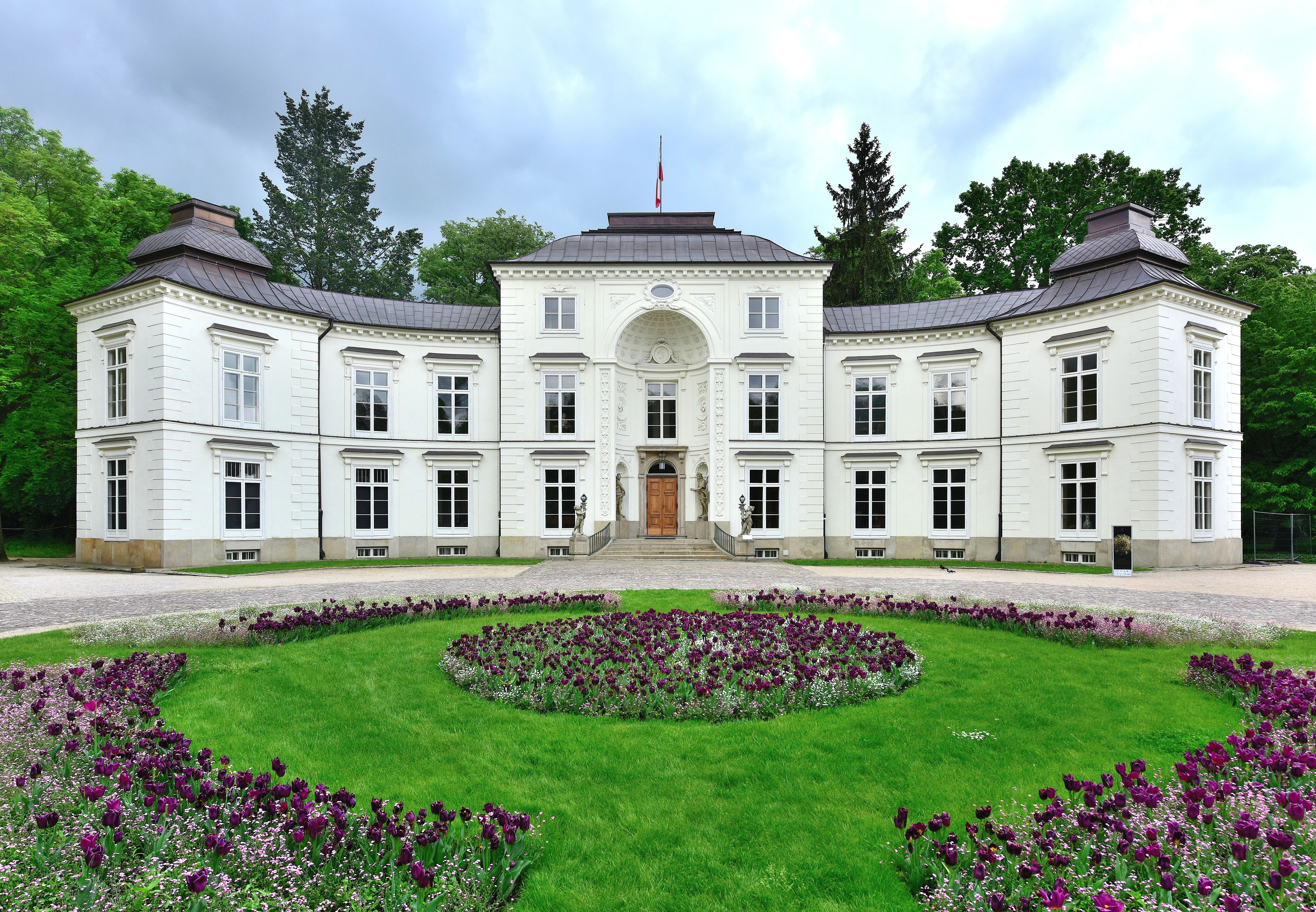
Myślewicki Palace

The palace, which was named after the now nonextant village of Myślewice, stood at the end of a road leading into town. Initially (in 1775) it was conceived as a one-storey villa set on a square. Flanking the building's main entrance, set off by lanterns held up by sculpted children, Monaldi's statues of Zephyr and Flora were enshrined within two smaller niches in 1777.

Before the building could be completed (as originally planned) quarter-circular wings were added to either side, ending with one-storey pavilions covered with the then fashionable Chinese-style roofs. Several years later, a floor was added to the one-storey pavilions. The edifice, designed by Merilini, took on the appearance of a classicist mansion. Tradition holds that the king gave it to his nephew, Prince Józef Poniatowski.

The mansion survived World War II, and many of its interiors retain their original décor. Noteworthy on the ground floor is the former dining hall (now a salon) with scenes of Rome and Venice by Plersch. Next to it (on the western side) is the former bathroom with marbled walls and a plafond painted by Plersch, showing Zephyr and Flora. Another room in the west suite is adorned with seven fanciful views of ancient ruins set against a romantic landscape.

They were painted by Antoni Herliczek. The next bedroom's walls are decorated with painted medallions showing hunting cupids on the prowls. On the second floor, only the décor of the little study has survived. Its walls are adorned with grayish-green panels into which medallions incorporating personification of learning and art have been woven.

=== Old Orangery ===
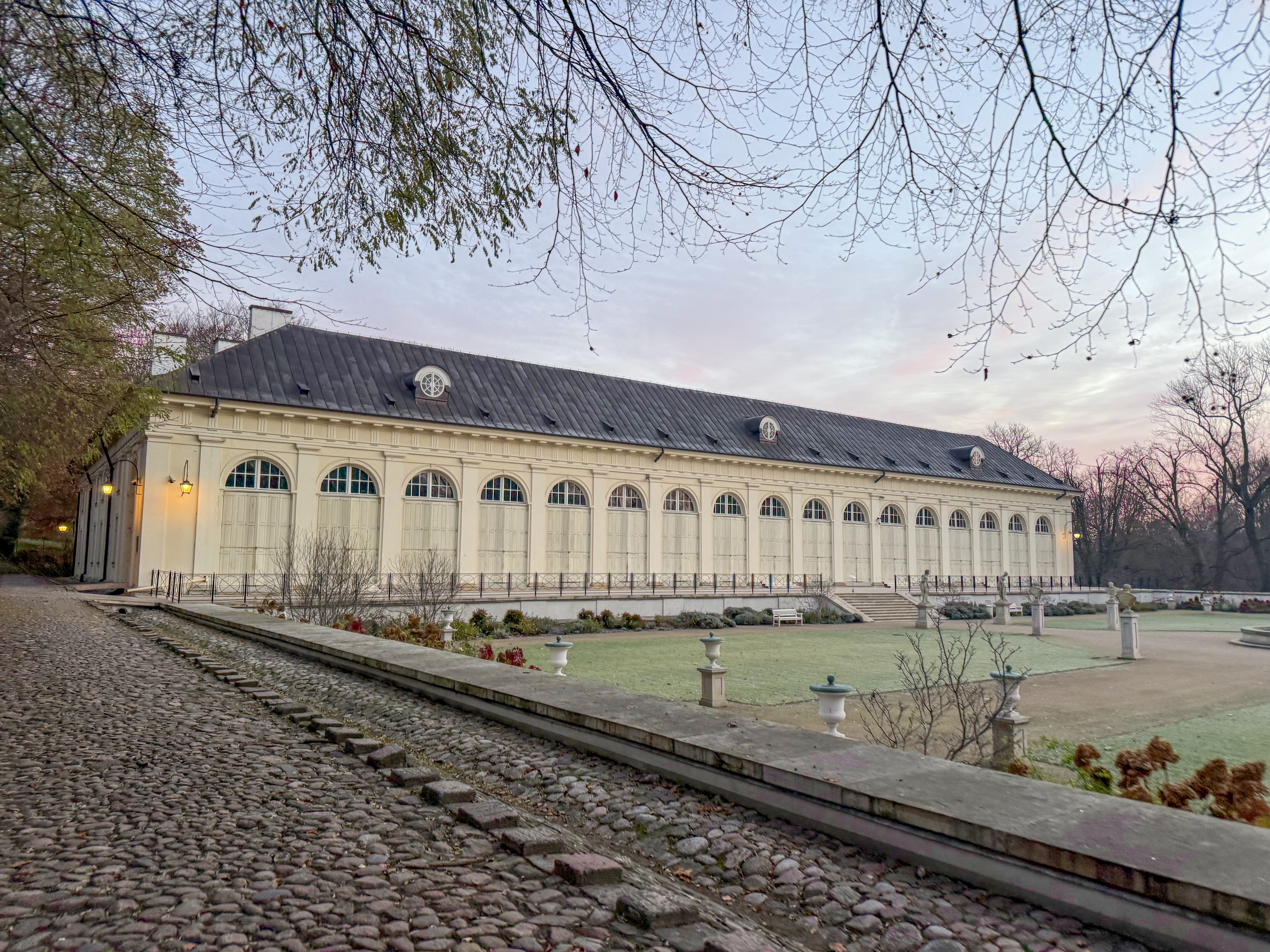
Old Orangery

The Old Orangery was erected in 1786–88 in a rectangular horseshoe shape, with the southern façade of the core structure broken up by pilasters and arcaded great windows. The adjoining wings to the west were quarters for gardeners and staff. In the considerably larger wing to the east, a theatre was set up with an entrance in the two-tiered elevation. Due to its richly decorated interior which has luckily survived to modern times, it is one of the world's few extant examples of an authentic 18th-century court theatre.

The simple, square-shaped audience area accommodated about 200 and comprised a ground floor where benches were arranged in amphitheatre fashion as well as three boxes on each wall overlooking the ground floor. The walls between the boxes were divided by pairs of pilasters, between which pilaster statues depicting women holding candles were placed. The statues were the work of Andrzej Le Brun who was assisted by Jakub Monaldi and Joachim Staggi. Above the real boxes, illusionary ones were painted to suggest yet another tier of boxes filled with a courtly, elegantly attired public. The painting was the work of Plersch who had also painted above the stage what appeared to be bas-reliefs of coats-of-arms with the crest of the Polish–Lithuanian Commonwealth at centre.

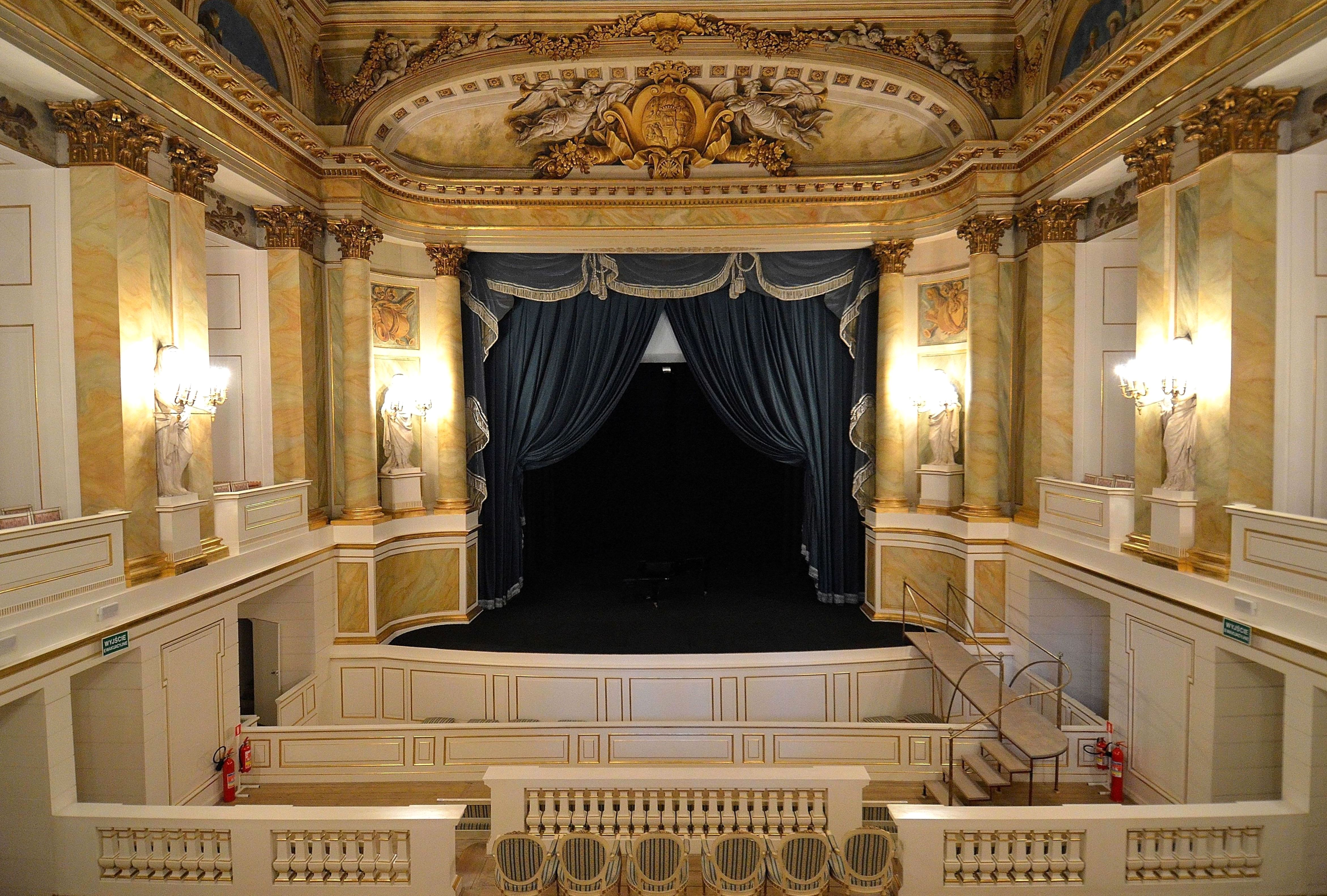
Old-Orangery Theater

Also painted by Plersch was the plafond depicting Apollo in a quadriga. The painting is set in a circular frame, beyond whose perimeters bas-relief-effect medallions bearing the likeness of the outstanding playwrights Sophocles, Shakespeare, Molière and Racine extend. The theatre's interior was built entirely of wood to ensure excellent acoustics. The deep stage has a slanted floor and displays fragments of the equipment of a former engine-room. At either sides of the stage, three-tiered actors' dressing rooms were found. In the west wing of the Old Orangery as well as in the corridors running along its main trunk a Gallery of Polish Sculpture has been set up. On exhibit are works dating from the 16th century up to 1939. Only a very few sculptures dating from the 16th and 17th centuries, as well as the first half of the 18th, are on display and they may be admired in Room 1. The next room contains sculptures from the latter half of the 18th century including works by Jan Jerzy Plersch, the artist's father, Franciszek Pinck and Andrzej Le Brun. Dating from the mid-19th century are works by such artist as Paweł Maliński- the first professor of Warsaw University's Chair of Sculpture, Jakub Tatarkiewicz, Władysław Oleszczyński- an outstanding representative of the romantic school, as well as Marceli Guyski and Henryk Sattler, the son of the painter Korneli.

=== New Orangery ===
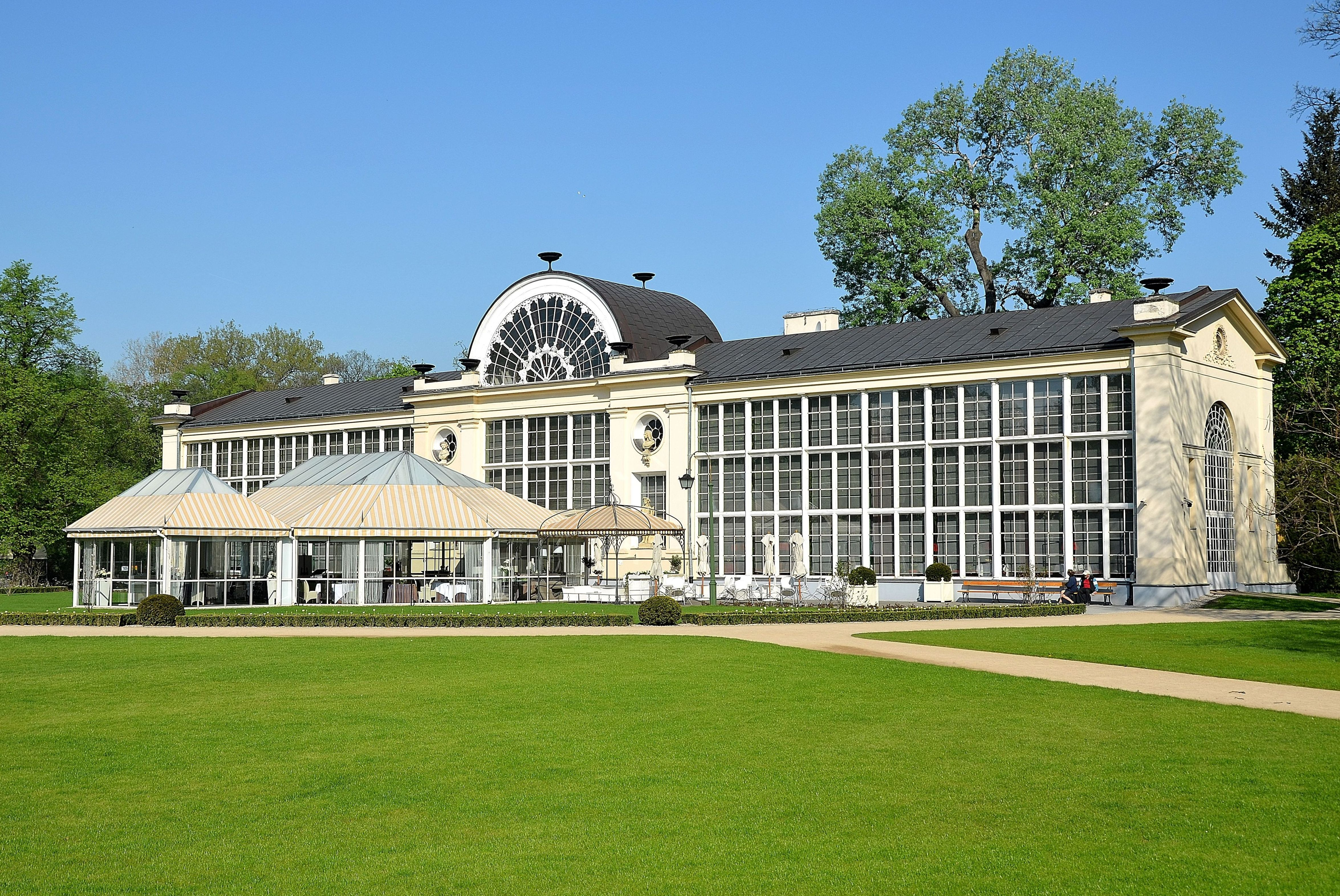
New Orangery

The building was built by Adam Adolf Loewe and Józef Orłowski in 1860. Neo-classicist with eclectic elements, it was designed to shelter the collection of orange trees.

The building was necessary because Tsar Alexander II of Russia, who purchased one of the largest in Europe collection of tropical plants from Nieborów, could not transport it to Saint Petersburg, due to climate conditions there. The collection's pride were long-lived orange trees (there were 124 of them in the collection). Unfortunately, during World War I, they were left without appropriate care and froze. The building consists of an oblong hall, with glass walls. Today it houses a tropical garden and a restaurant in the northern wing.

=== Temple of Diana ===
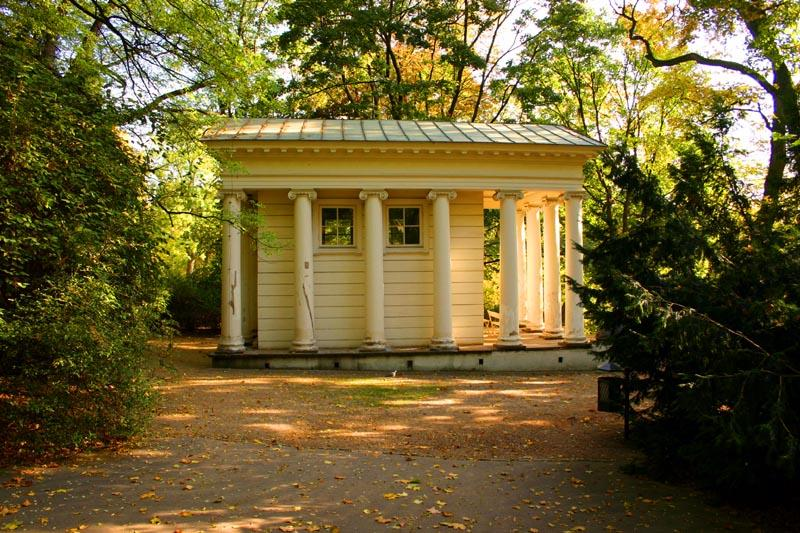
Temple of Diana

In 1822, Jakub Kubicki erected a classicist temple to the goddess Diana. Also called the "Temple of the Sibyl," it stands next to the northwest part of the southern Łazienki lake. The wooden building is massive and decorated inside with murals with flower and fruit motifs.

=== Egyptian temple ===
An Egyptian temple was also built in 1822 by Jakub Kubicki, on the southwest shore of the southern Łazienki Lake. It was placed next to the fortress built by Stanisław Lubomirski, which protected Warsaw south of that point. In 1771 a bridge was built to it. During the Warsaw Uprising, only the northern part of the temple survived; the southern part has never been rebuilt.

The Museum of Scouting is currently located in the temple.

=== Water tower ===
The Water Tower is a neoclassical structure, built in 1777–78 and 1822 by Jan Christian Kamsetzer and Chrystian Piotr Aigner. It was modeled after Caecilia Metella's mausoleum on the Appian Way in Rome and currently serves as a museum of jewelry.

=== Hermitage ===
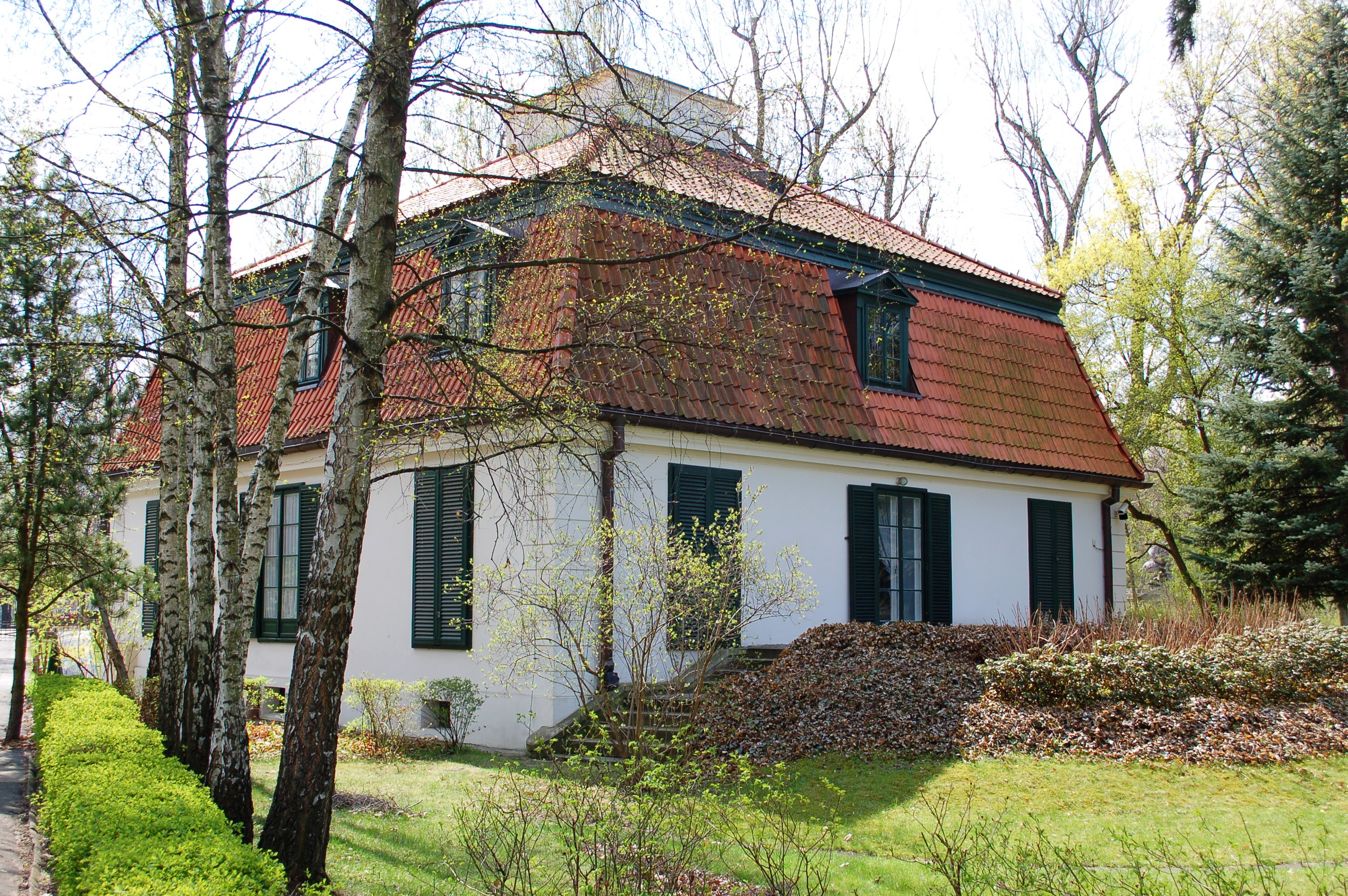
The Hermitage

Situated outside the precincts of Łazienki Park on the opposite side of Agrykola Street, this small square building is covered with a mansard roof that conceals its little upstairs rooms. The Hermitage once served Marshal Stanisław Herakliusz Lubomirski as a retreat. For a time, a companion of King Stanislaus Augustus, Madame Teresa Lhuiller, lived here. Destroyed by fire at the start of his reign, the Hermitage was rebuilt in 1777.

For many years following World War II, the building housed a kindergarten. At present, since the restoration of its interior, the Hermitage serves as a venue for concerts, book promotions, meetings with authors, and other social and cultural events.

=== Old Guardhouse ===
The Old Guardhouse, designed by Kamsetzer, was built in 1791–92 for the guards protecting the approach to the palace. It stands next to the north pond, at the roadside. The building's façade was embellished with four Doric columns and a partly balustraded attic. Though modest-sized, the building conveys a majestic image. It now serves as a venue for temporary exhibitions.

=== New Guardhouse ===
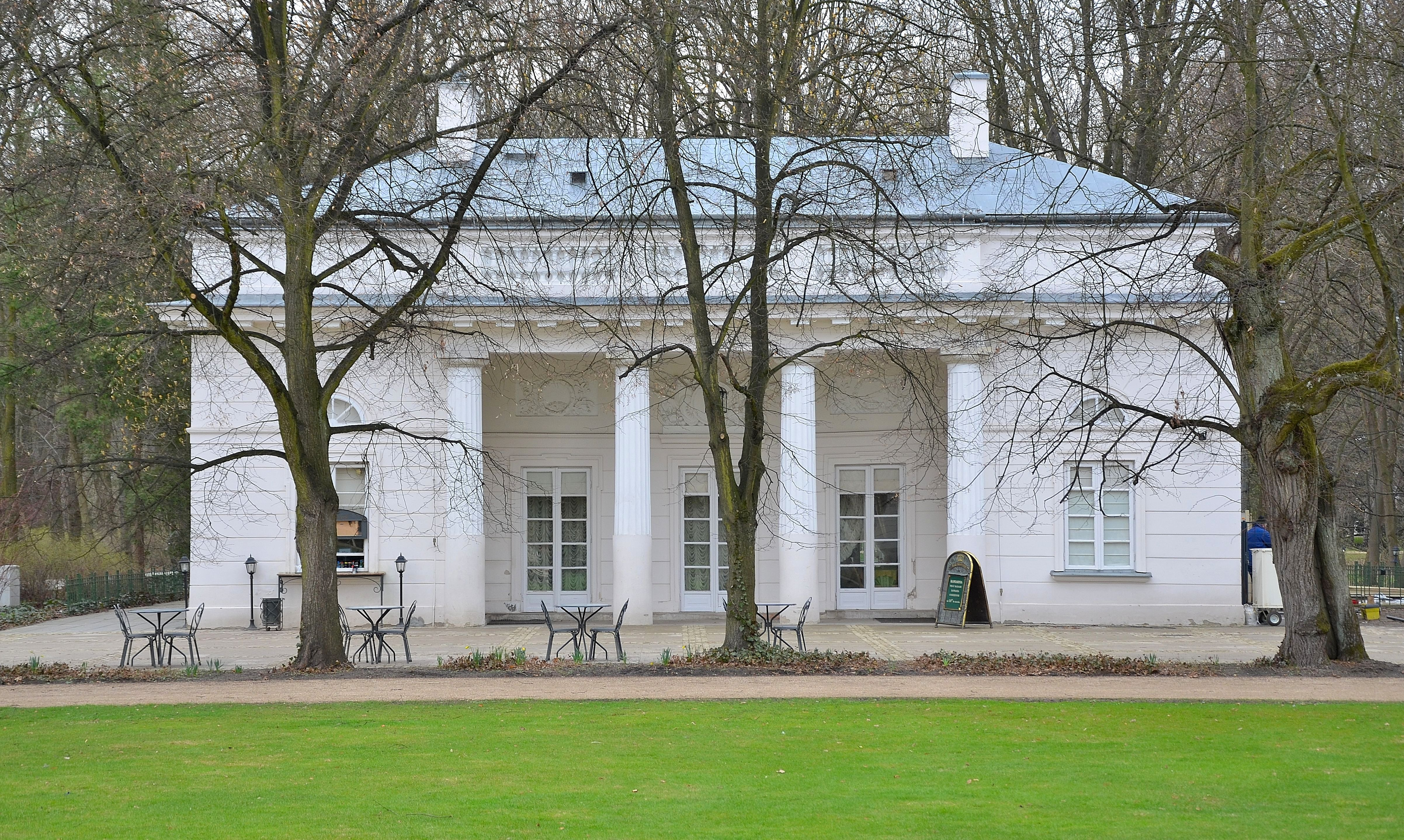
The New Guardhouse

The new Guardhouse is situated near the west side of the Palace on the Isle. It came into being through the reconstruction of a little building erected in 1779–1780 for the then-popular game Trou-Madame, and murals adorned both its exterior and interior walls. In 1782, the building was converted into a theatre called the "Little Theatre", with portable wooden booths serving as the actors’ changing rooms. After a proper theatre was created in the Old Orangery, the Little Theatre lost its reason for existence. It was turned into a storage-room where statues were kept and was therefore referred to at that time as the marble supply-house.

In 1830, Jakub Kubicki rebuilt the structure in the classicist style. Between the segments added on the east side, he introduced columns with partially grooved shafts. The external decorations incorporated cartouches with panoplies and masks of Mars, the god of war. Today the building houses a café known under the 18th-century name of Trou-Madame.

=== Stables and Coach-houses ===
This building was constructed in 1825–1826 in the grange area on the eastern side of Łazienki Gardens on the site of earlier wooden structures. It was designed along the lines of a simple horseshoe with a higher (one-storey) central portion used as staff quarters. The ground-floor wings directly adjoining the main (central) building were used as stables and the side wings served as coach-houses. The building was designed by Kulbicki and reflected a classicist architectural style, it contains conservators’ work-shops.

=== Invalids' Barracks ===
This structure was built in 1825–1826 in the portion of the grange found at the south side of Łazienki Gardens. The one-storey rectangular building stands out for the severity of its architecture. Its designer could have been Wilhelm Henryk Minter, who built no longer extant barracks for hussars, uhlans and cuirassiers in the vicinity. Today it is the home of the Hunters’ and Riders’ Museum.

=== Narutowicz's house ===
Between the stables and invalids’ barracks is a villa with a façade adorned with round panels, while the back is marked by a three-sided projection. The structure was built in the 1830s, possibly as lodgings for senior army officers. After Poland regained independence following World War I, the building served for two years as the residence of Gabriel Narutowicz before he became the first president of the resurrected Polish Republic. Today the building serves as a nursery school.

This building should not be confused with Narutowicz's villa, just outside Łazienki Park at 23 Dworkowa St., where Narutowicz stayed as president from 11 to 16 December 1922, when he was assassinated.

=== Bridge, with monument to King John III Sobieski ===
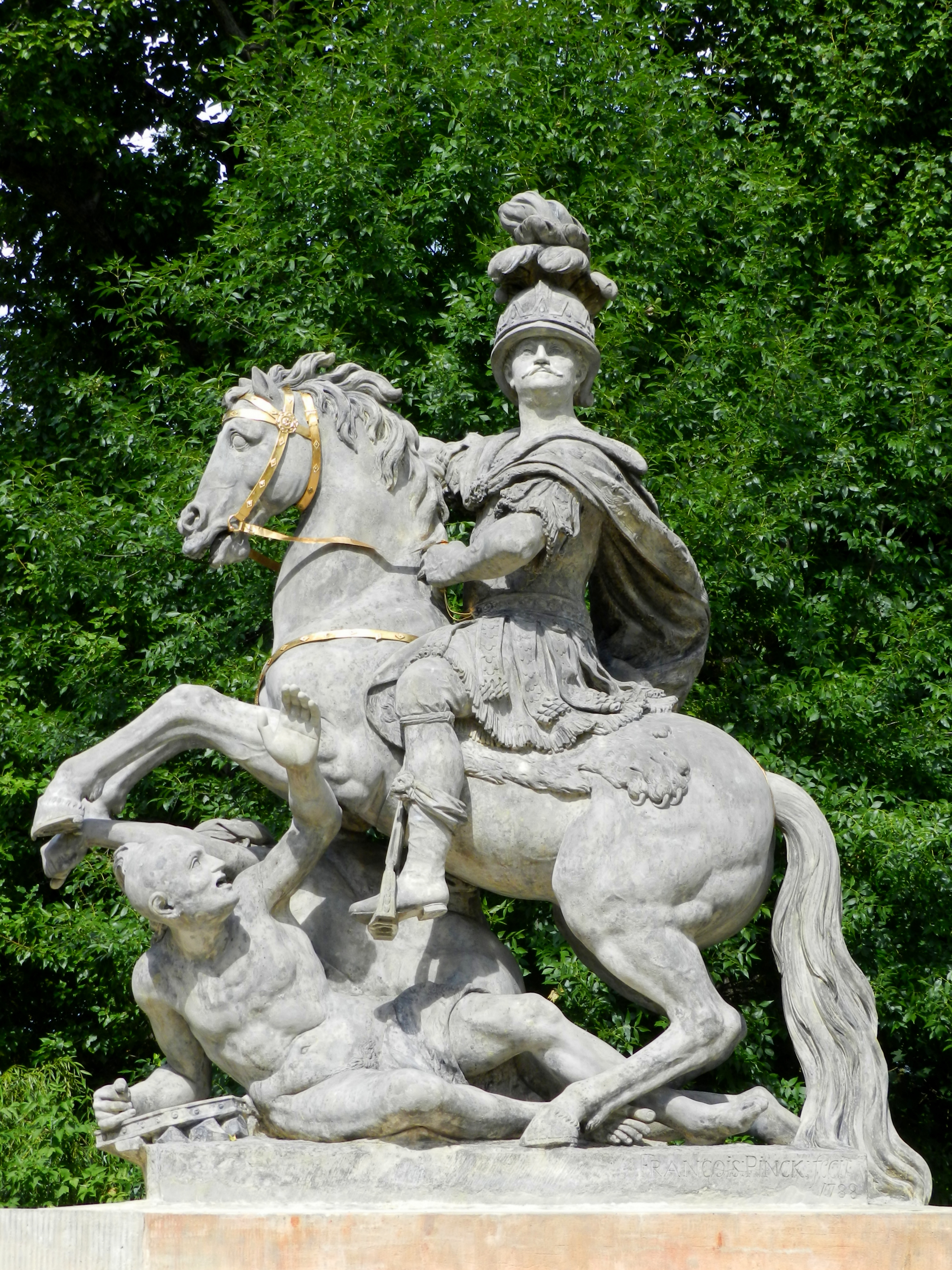
Monument to John III Sobieski, atop the bridge

A bridge with a monument to King John III Sobieski closes off the view from the north windows of the Łazienki Palace. The bridge, originally single-span, covered with stone panels, was erected in 1777–80. In 1877, when the canal was widened, two new spans were added on the east side. The central section of the bridge was designed by Dominik Merlini.

The King Sobieski Monument was designed by Andre Le Brun, who modelled it on King John Sobieski's equestrian statue at Wilanów. The statue's execution was made easier by a rough-hewn stone block, set aside for this purpose, that had lain at the Szydłowiec quarry since Sobieski's time. The monument shows a rider in knight's armor astride a rearing steed whose hooves trample two Ottoman Turks. The monument symbolizes Sobieski's victory over the Turks at the Battle of Vienna (1683).

== Buildings near the park ==
=== The Belweder ===
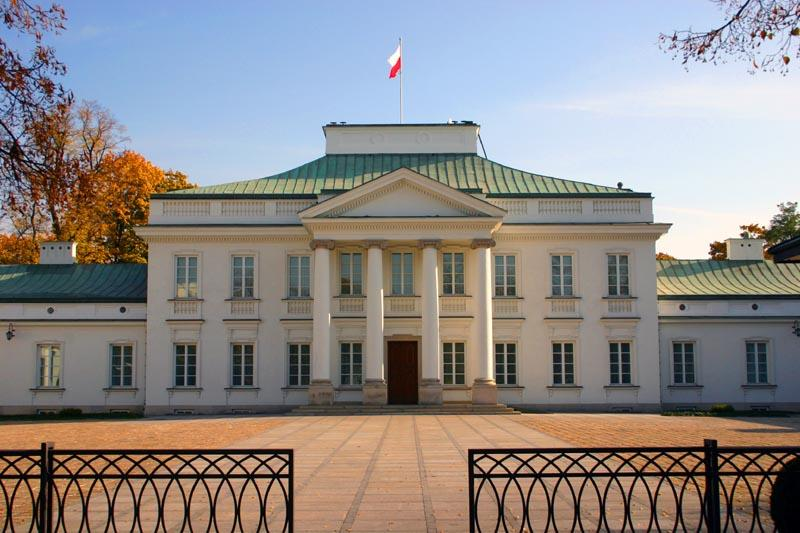
Belweder Palace

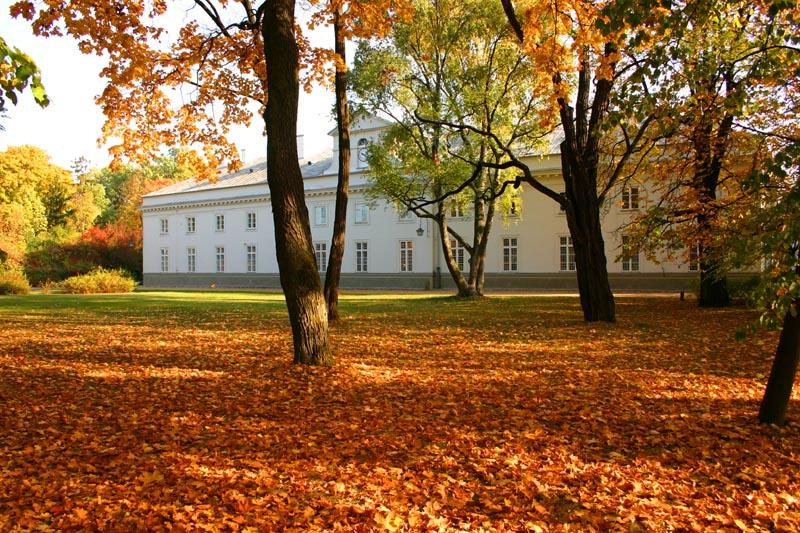
Officer cadets' barracks

The Belweder, also called Belvedere, came into being in 1659 through the reconstruction of an older structure from about 1600. It was Krzysztof Zygmunt Pac, the Grand Chancellor of Lithuania, who erected a palatial villa at the edge of a tall escarpment for his wife, Klara Izabella de Lascaris, who was an attendant at the court of Queen Marie Louise Gonzaga. Owing to the views from the villa's windows, it was named the Belvedere (from Latin bellus vedere, literally "beautiful view"). In the 1730s, the old building was replaced with a new brick building of rectangular shape designed by architect Józef Fontana.

Having purchased the Belvedere to add to his estates in 1767, Stanislaus Augustus had originally planned to reconstruct it. That, however, never came about. Instead, he had it used for officials‘ and servants‘ quarters and set up a porcelain-manufacturing plant. in the north annexe.

The Belvedere first underwent major reconstruction in 1819–1822 when Grand Duke Constantine, the tsarist viceroy in Russian-occupied Poland, decided to make it his residence. The baroque structure was remodelled in the classicist style. To the building's main hull two one-floor perpendicular wings were added. The façade and garden wall were enhanced with monumental columned porticoes. Elements of the original décor have survived to this day in the palace's interior, particularly in the Blue Room, known as the Pompeii Room, and the Drawing-Room. Many pieces of furniture and other smaller historic items have also survived. Until recently, the Belvedere was the seat of the president of Poland.

In the garden stretching directly beneath the Belvedere escarpment, two pavilions were erected in 1822, most likely designed by Jakub Kubicki: the Temple of Diana (also known as the Temple of Sibyl) and the Egyptian Temple. The former, situated in the garden's northern section, reflected the classical architecture of ancient Greece. It was built entirely of wood, and murals with floral motifs adorned its interior. Lying cast-iron lions guarded its entrance. The other pavilion was built in the garden's south section atop the embankment of former trenches (dating from 1771) that had encircled Warsaw and were known as Lubomirski's Ramparts. The pavilion's roof, topped with an attic, was also a terrace though which a road ran. Initially, the terrace was adorned by a tall wooden obelisk covered with red hieroglyphics. The central portion of the buildings opens on the water canal outside through four lotus columns. Below are the busts of lions squirting water into the pool running along the temple.

=== Ujazdów Castle ===
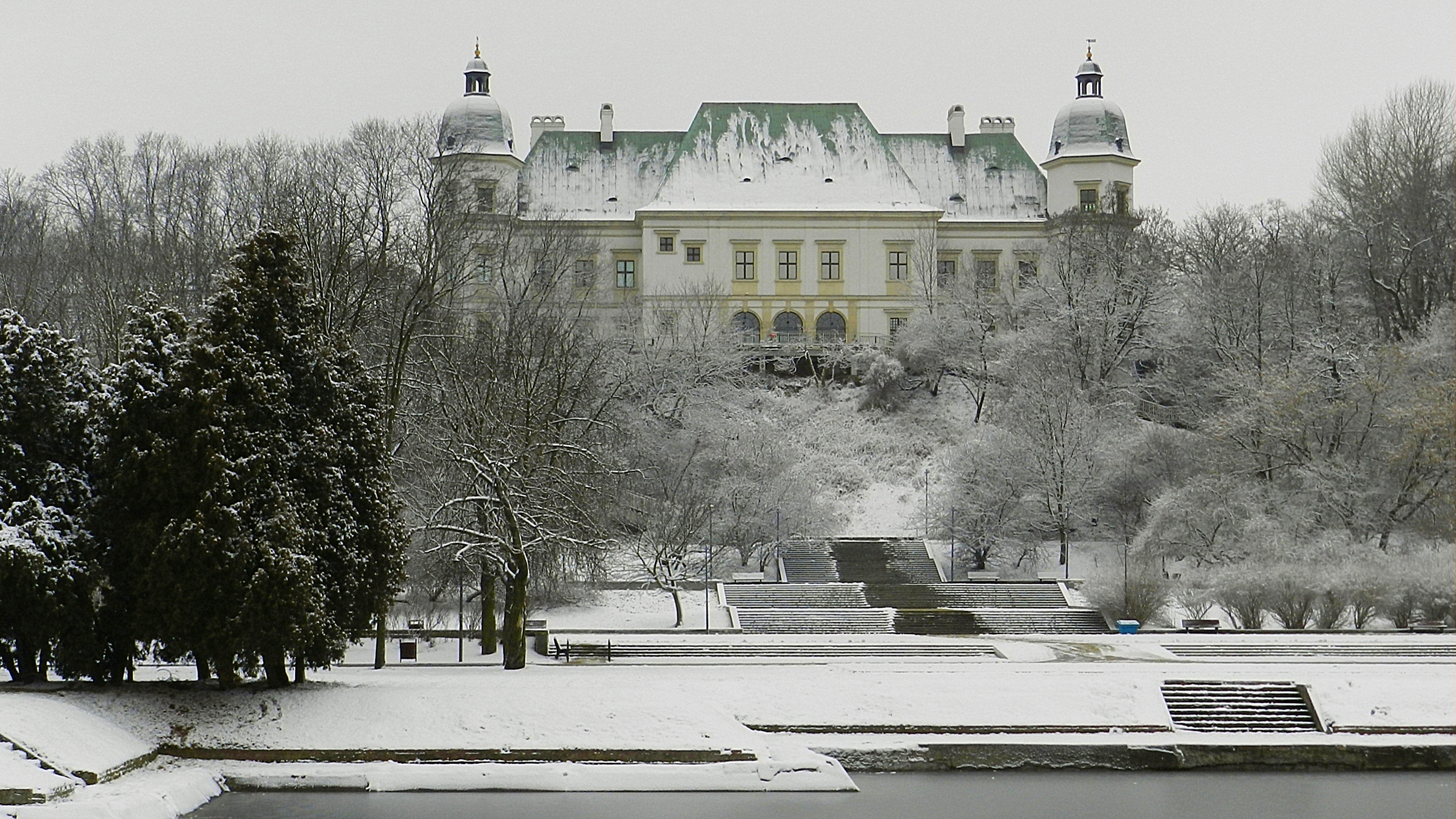
Ujazdów Castle and royal canal

The current building was constructed in 1975 after a fire, during the 1944 Warsaw Uprising, destroyed the previous stone construction. Castles have existed on the site since around the 13th century. In 1624 construction began on a stone castle ordered by King Sigismund III Vasa. It was remodeled by subsequent owners, Lubomirski and King Stanislaus Augustus. In 1784 the King donated the property to the Polish Army.

In the 18th century the castle was included in the Stanislavian Axis, a line of parks and palaces planned for the southern outskirts of Warsaw, much like the Saxon Axis in the city center. Since 1981 the castle has been the home of the Center for Contemporary Art.

=== Astronomical Observatory ===
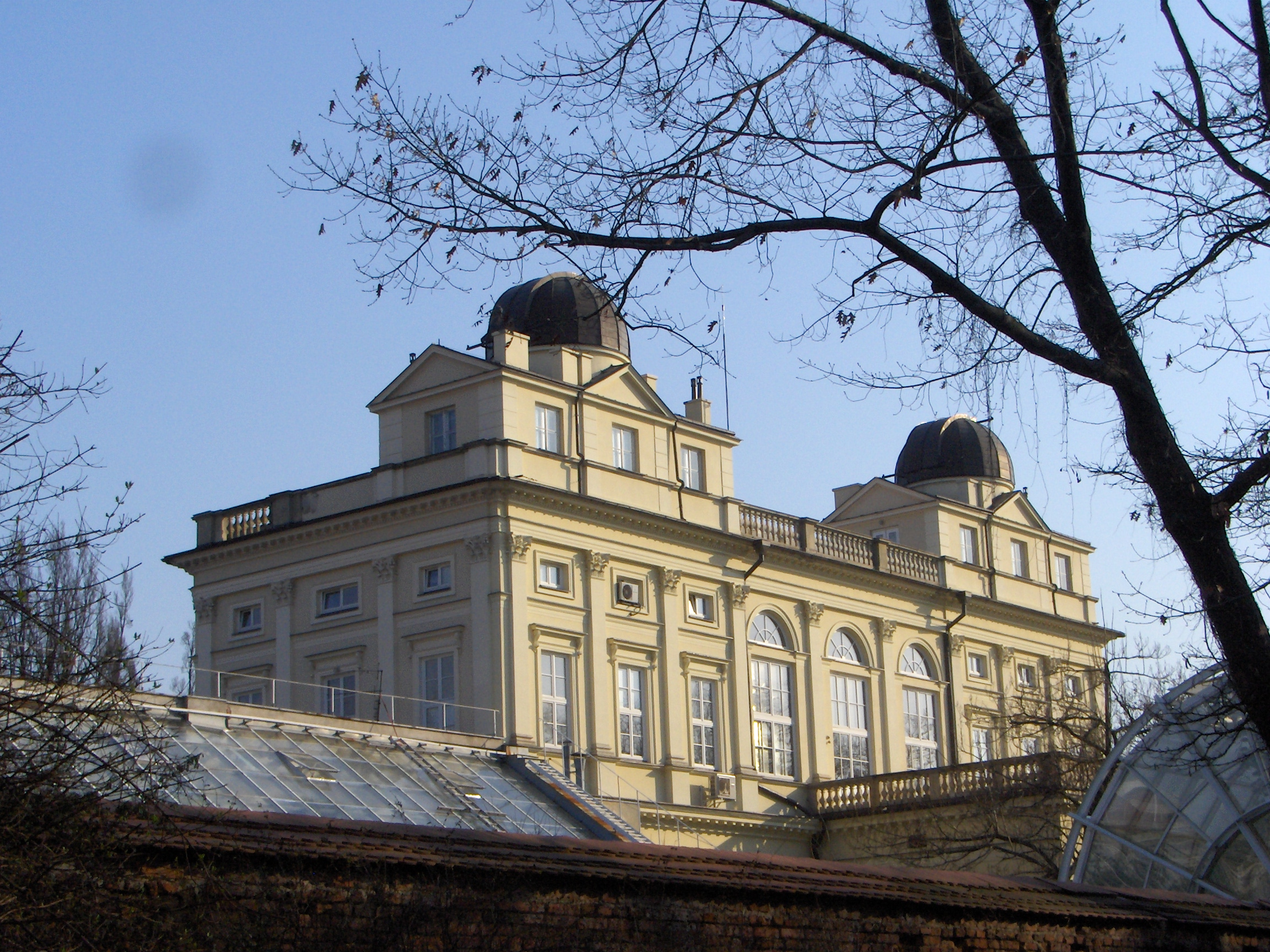
Astronomical Observatory

Along Ujazdów Avenue, within the Botanical Gardens, stands the Warsaw University Astronomical Observatory. It was built in 1824 in late classicist style by Chrystian Piotr Aigner and Hilary Szpilowski.

Adjoining it to the south are the King's hothouses, built about 1790. Still standing are the royal salon, with a triple entrance; gardener's cottage; part of the coach-house; and the hothouse proper, where figs and pineapples were cultivated.

The salon, where the King received guests and diplomats, was originally decorated with murals by Jan Jerzy Plersch. This building is Warsaw's only surviving example of this type of 18th-century architecture. The hothouses were designed by Jan Chrystian Kamsetzer.

== Chopin monument ==
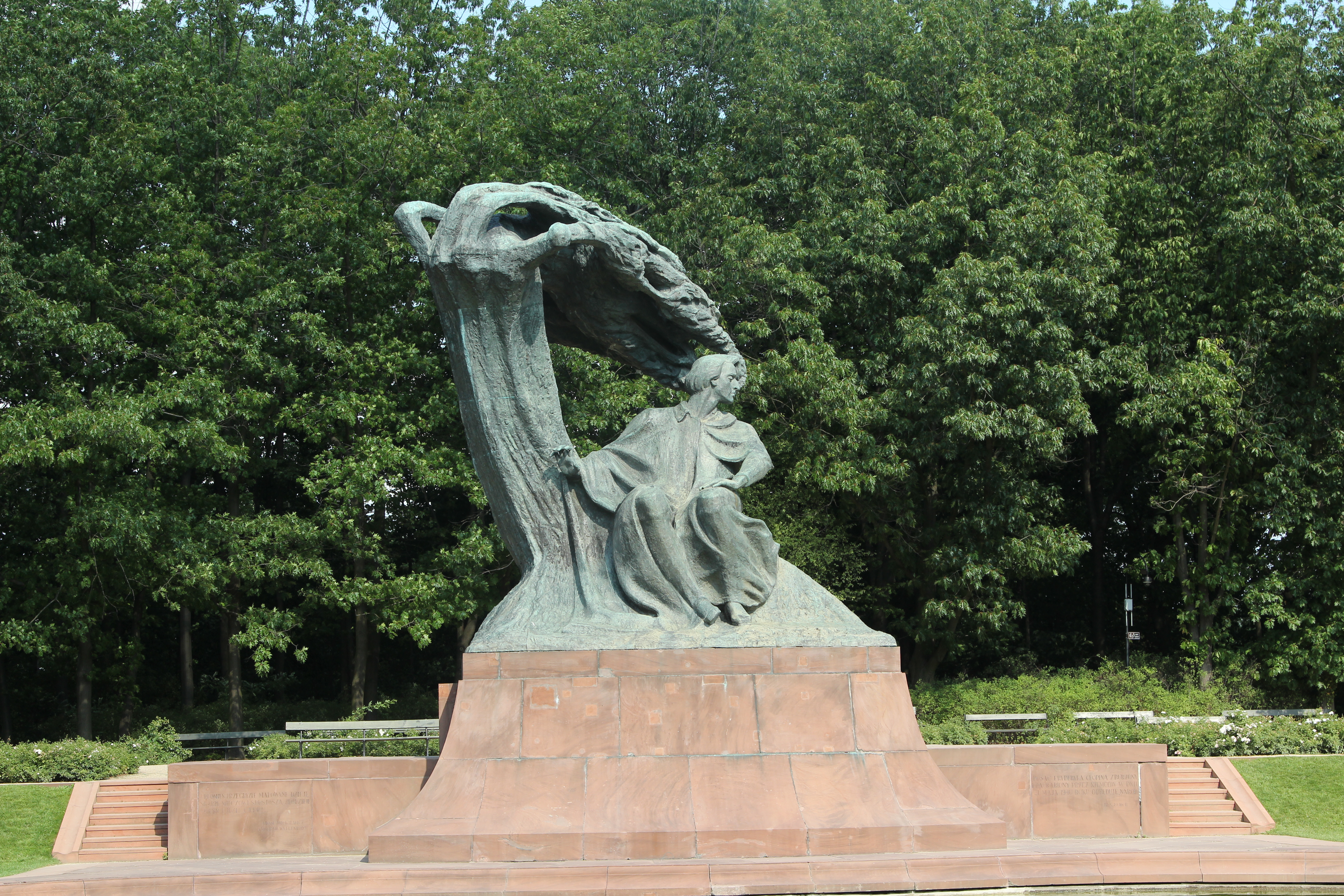
Chopin statue

Just off Ujazdów Avenue, Łazienki Park features the Frédéric Chopin Monument.

The bronze statue was designed in 1907 by sculptor Wacław Szymanowski for erection on the centenary of Chopin's 1810 birth, but its execution was delayed first by controversy over the design, then by World War I. The tree's branches, in frontal view, take the shape of the composer's fingers.

The statue was finally cast and erected in 1926. In World War II, it was the first Warsaw monument destroyed by the occupying Germans.

On summer Sundays, free piano concerts of Chopin compositions are held at the monument. (The piano is placed on the platform to the right of the statue,)

== Museum of Hunting and Horsemanship ==
The Museum of Hunting and Horsemanship (Polish: Warszawa Muzeum Łowiectwa i Jeździectwa) is located in the park. The museum opened in 1983, had its first permanent exhibition in 1985, and is now part of the Royal Łazienki Museum. It is housed in two historic buildings. The collection includes mounted antlers and taxidermied animals as well as carriages and saddles. The museum celebrates the tradition of hunting and includes artworks and exhibits that feature it. The museum hosts an annual competition since 2010 to try to break Maria Zandbang's horse jumping record.

== See also ==
- Bath, Somerset
- List of contemporary amphitheatres
- List of Roman public baths
- Saxon Garden
- Thursday dinners
- Ujazdów Park
- Bust of Piotr Wysocki

== Gallery ==
Historic images

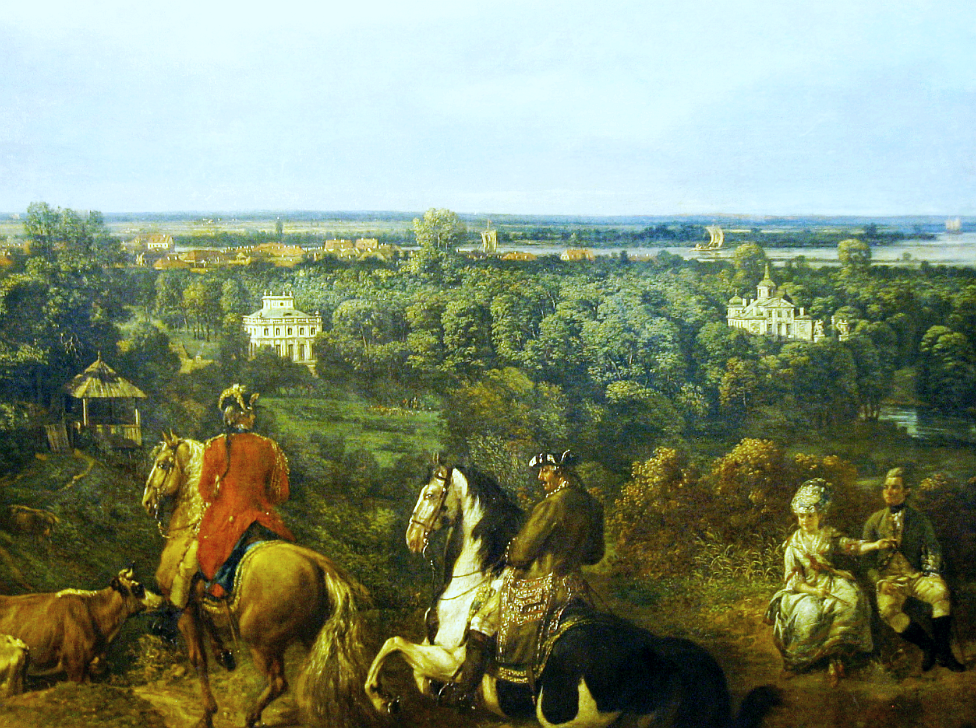
Łazienki Park, 1775, by Bernardo Bellotto

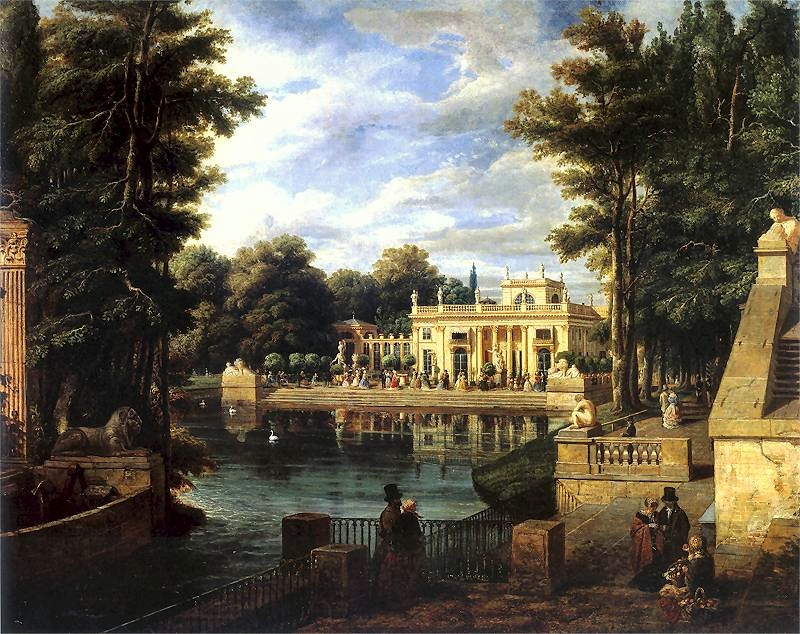
Łazienki Palace, 1836, by Marcin Zaleski

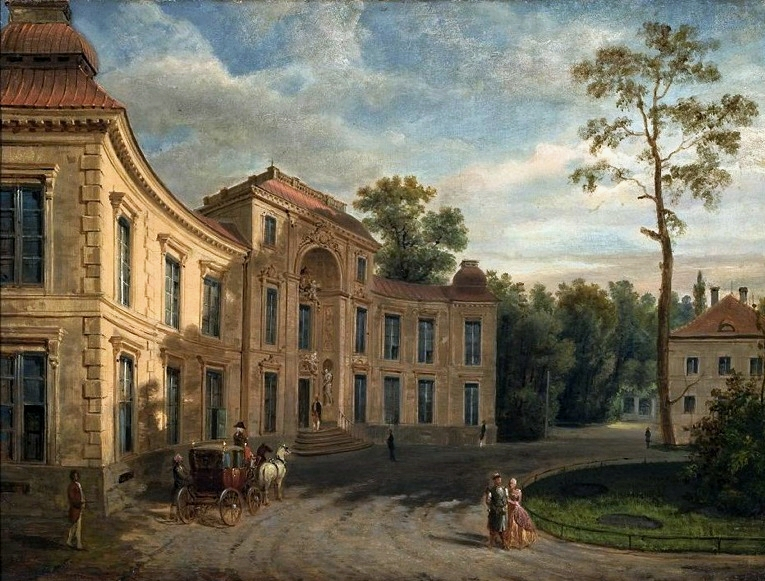
Myslewicki Palace, 1830s, by Marcin Zaleski

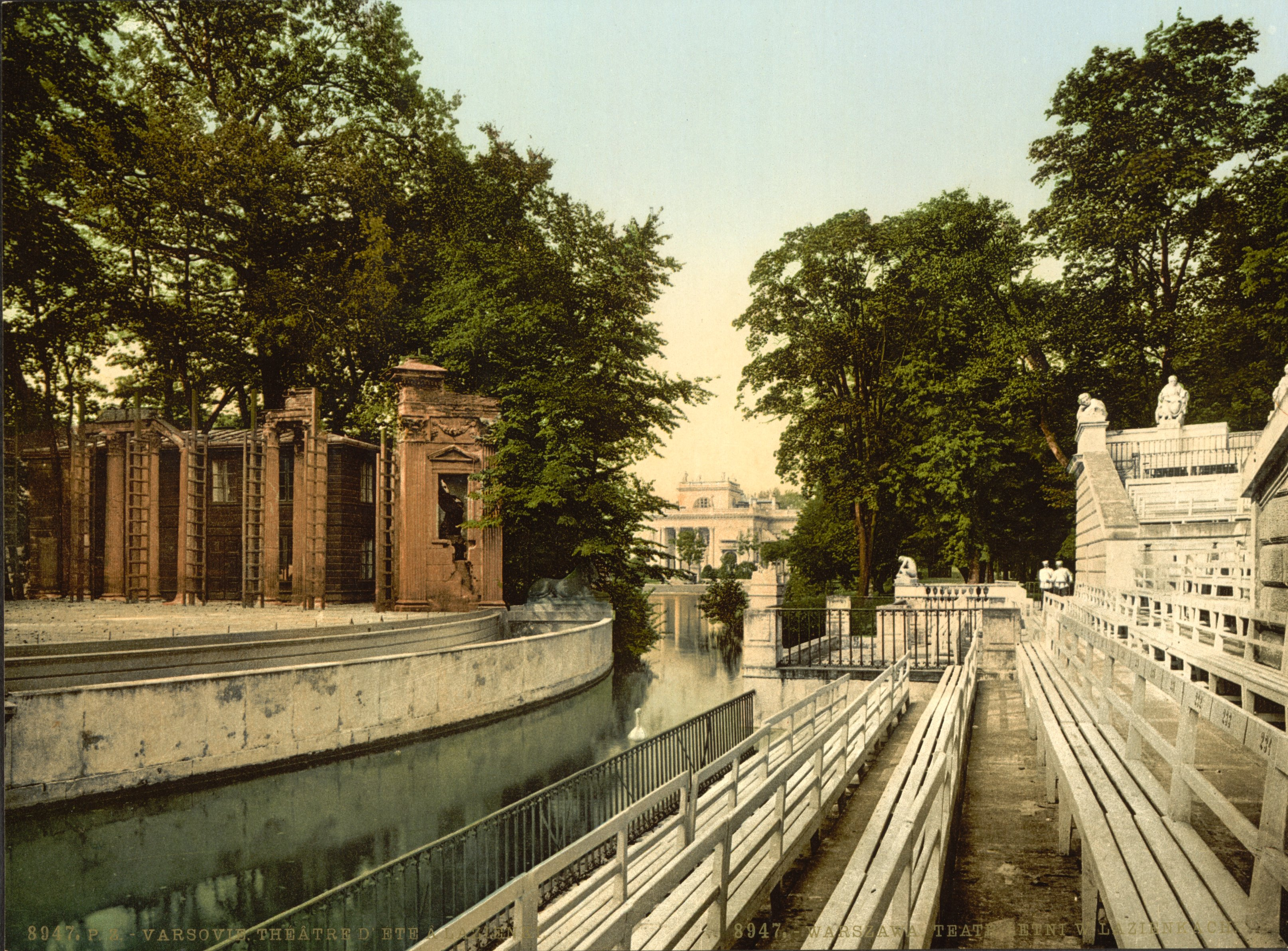
Roman theater, ca. 1900

By Vogel (1800s)

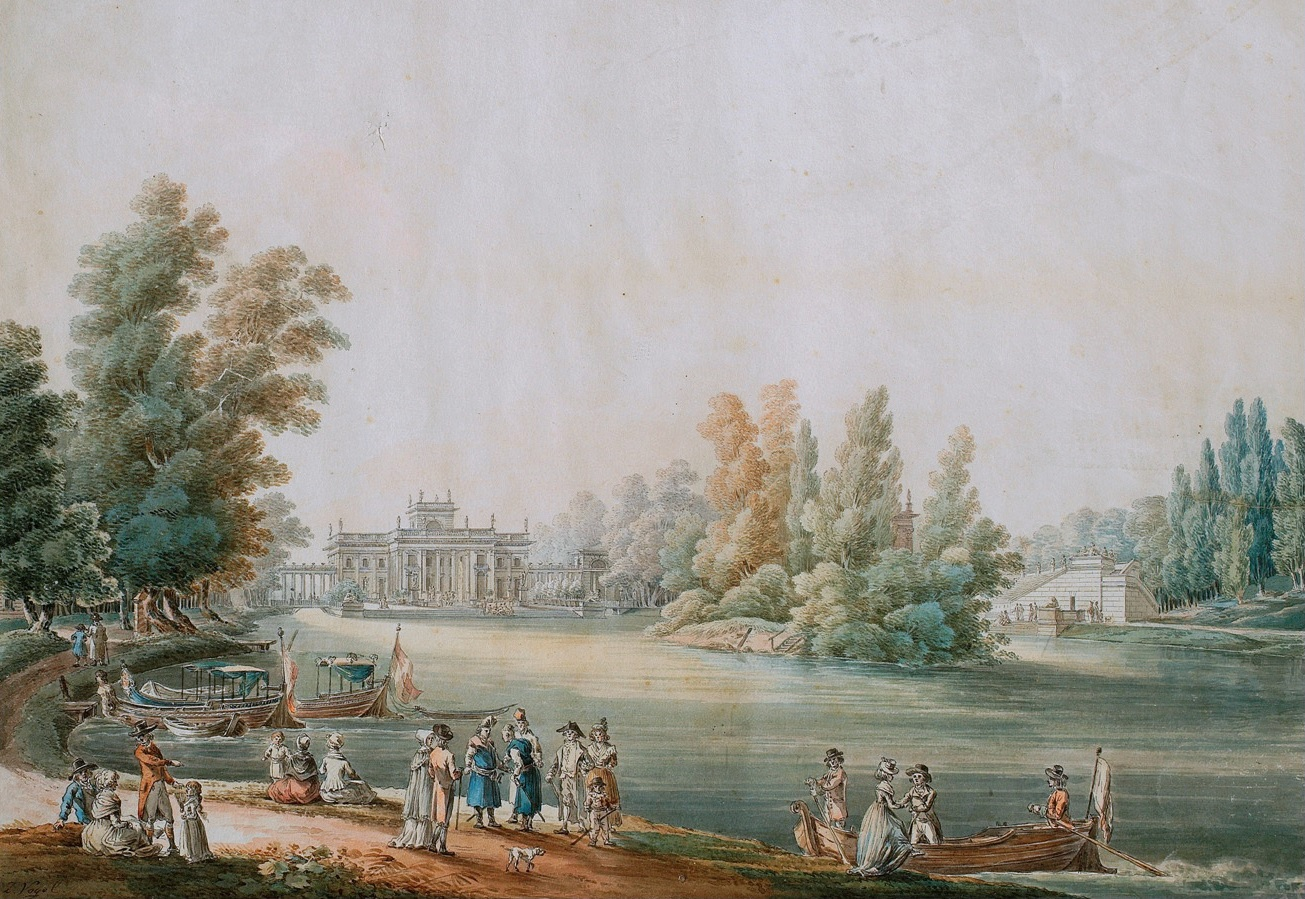
Palace on the Water

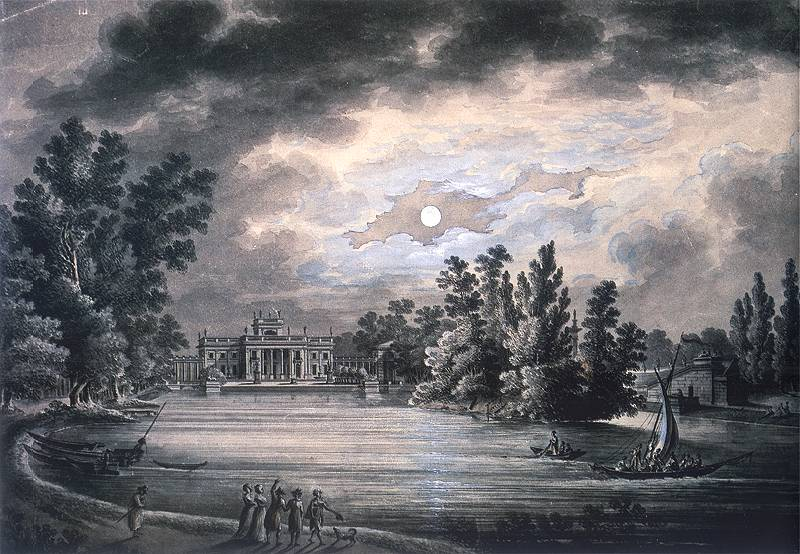
Palace on the Water by moonlight

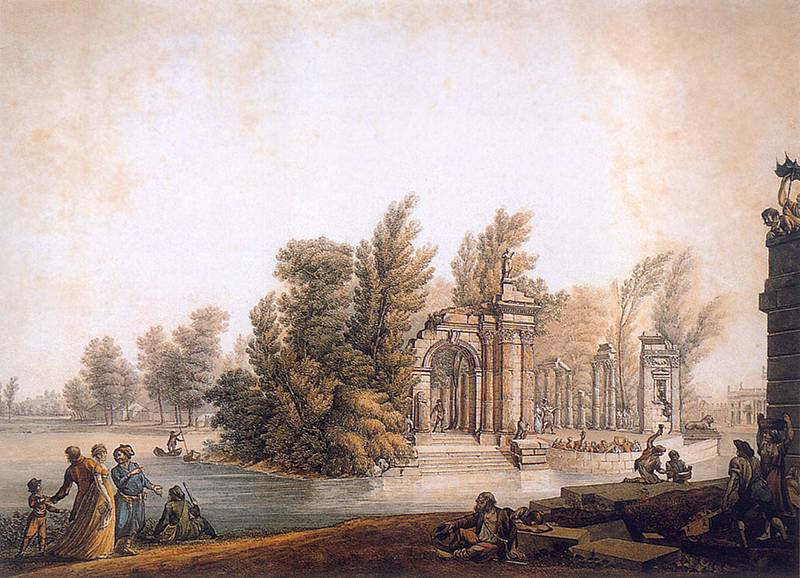
Roman theater

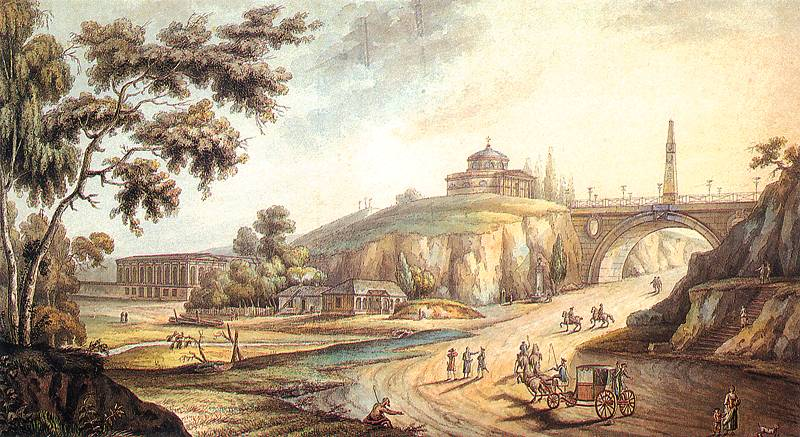
Ujazdów Church

Garden features

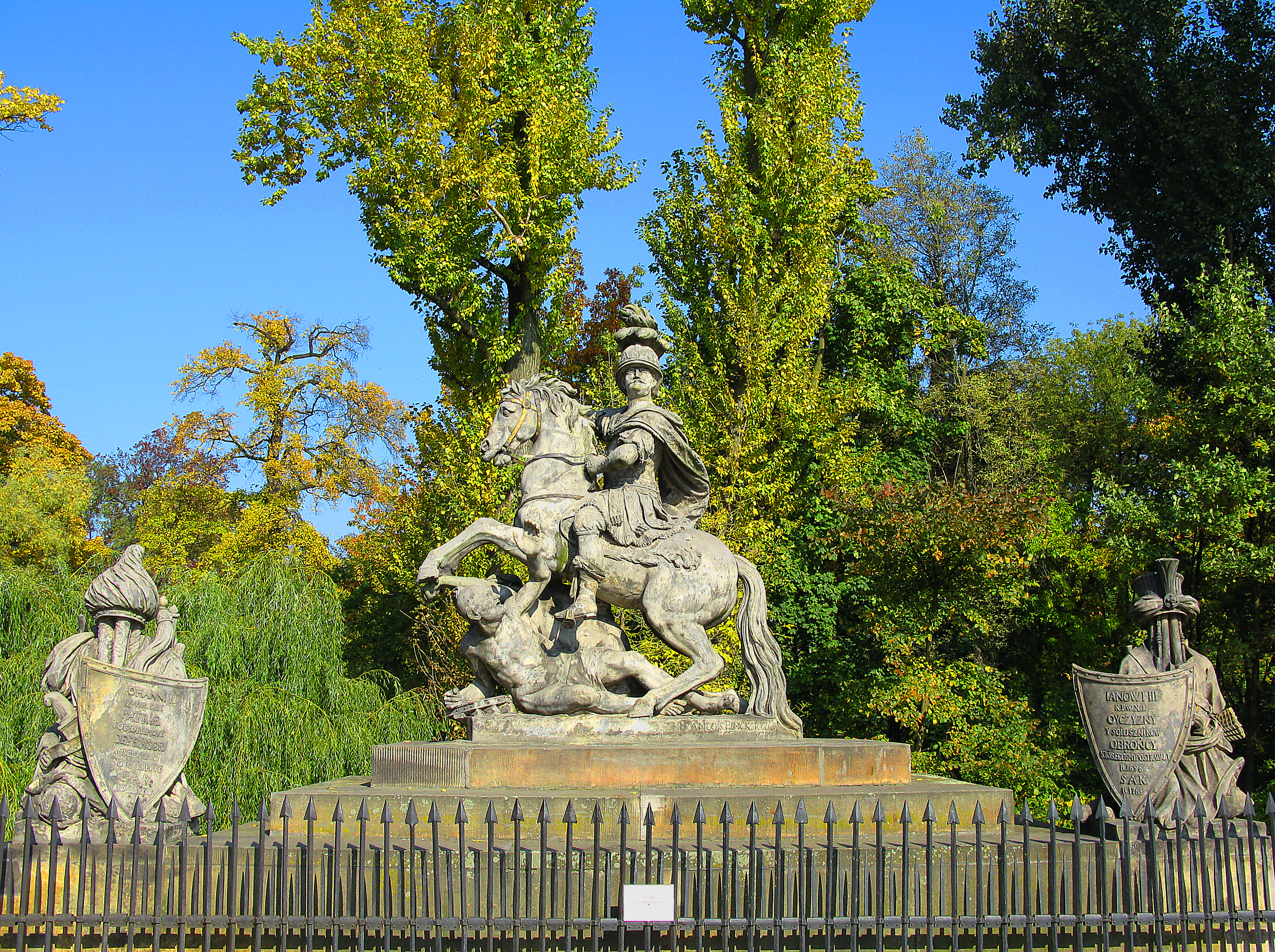
Equestrian statue of King Jan III Sobieski

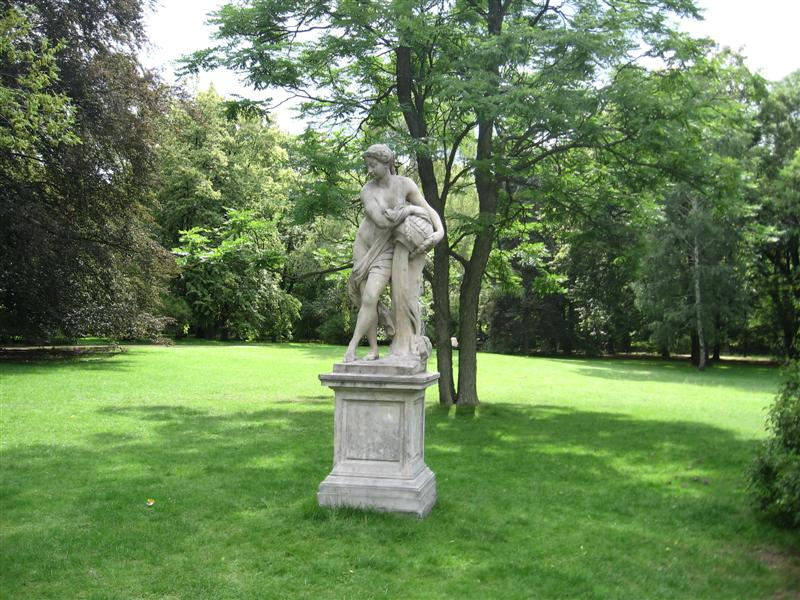
18th-century garden sculpture

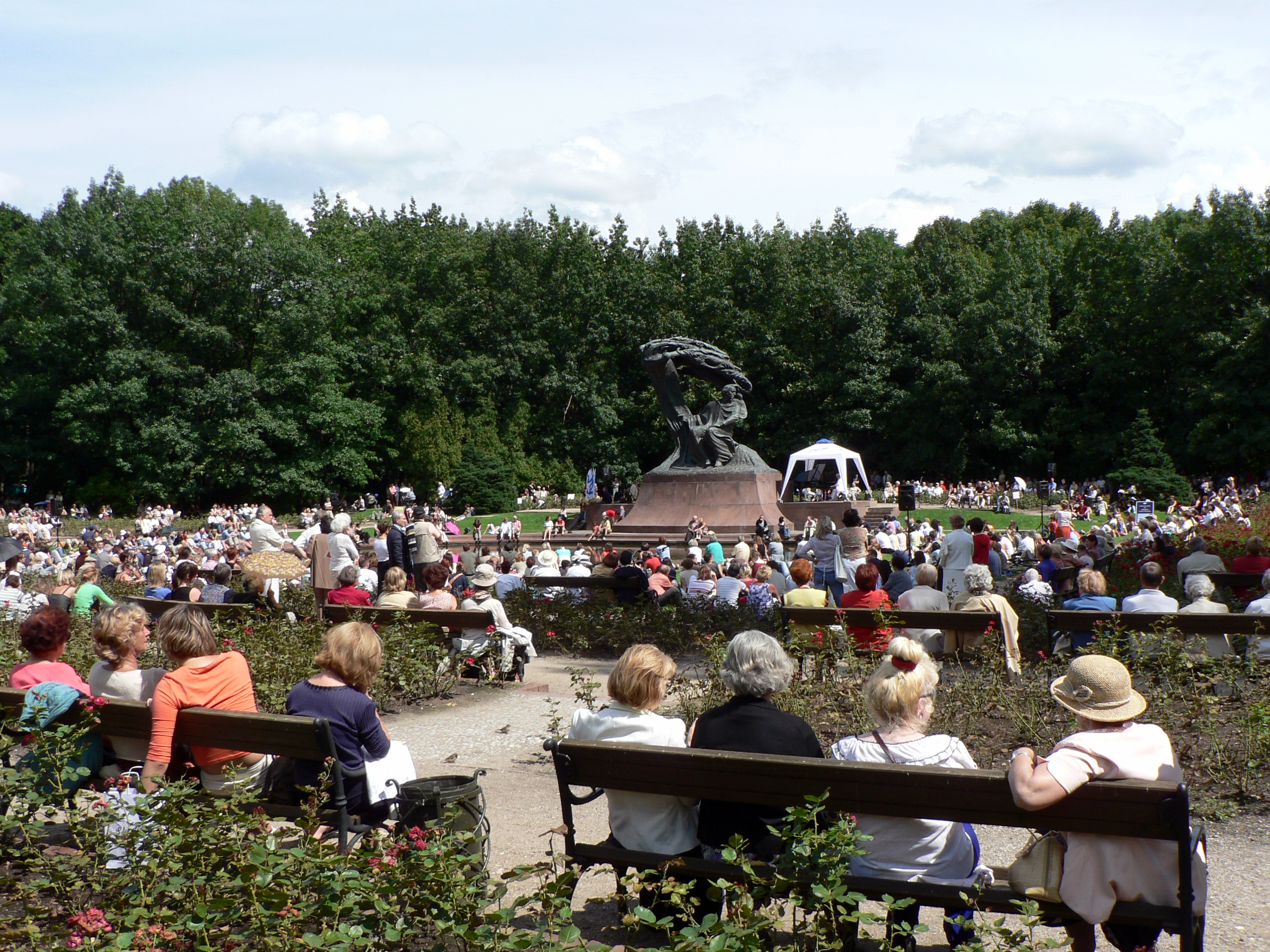
Summer Sunday piano recital at Chopin monument

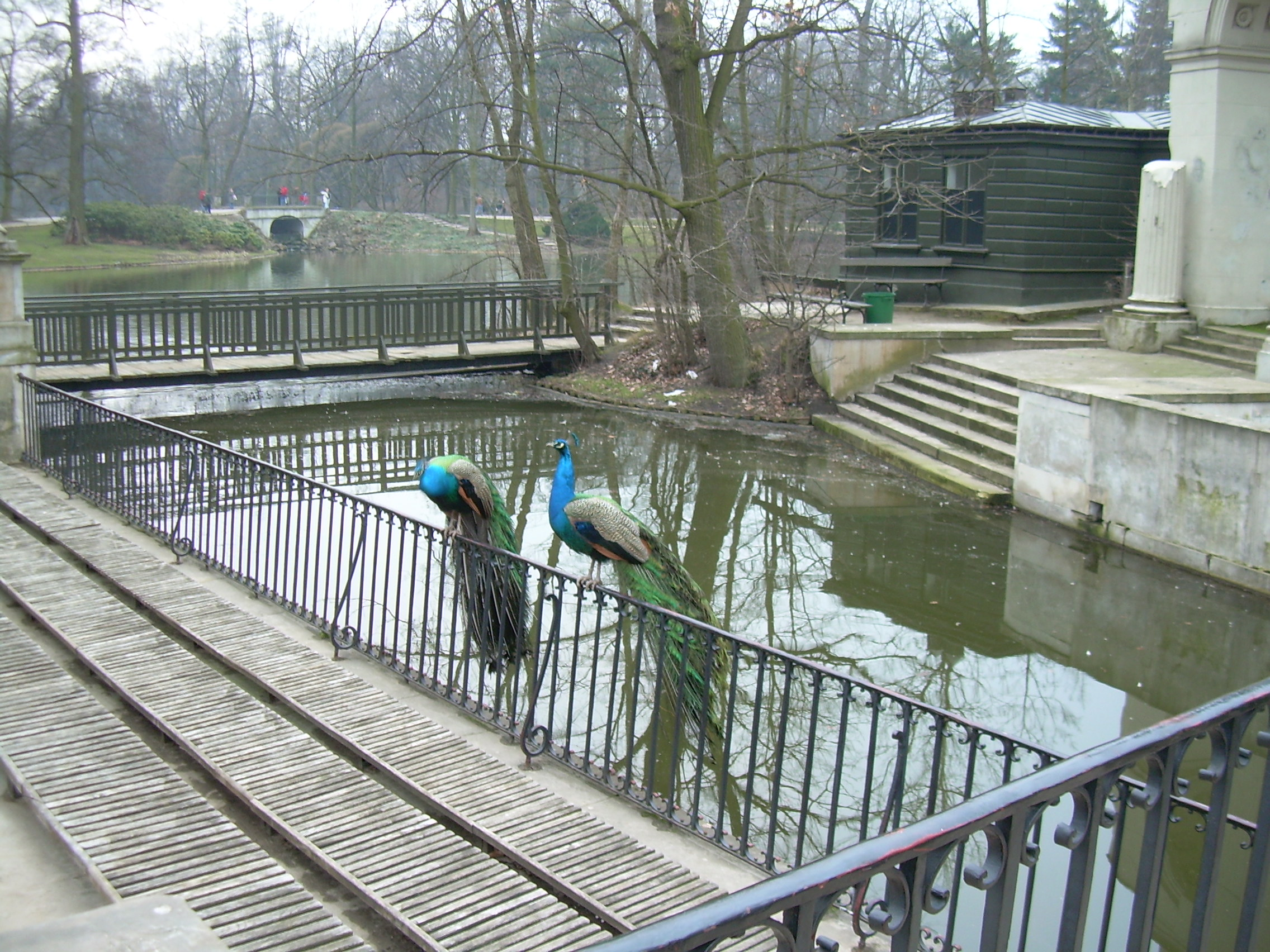
Peacocks at Roman theater — one of several animal species in the park

Museum of Hunting and Horsemanship

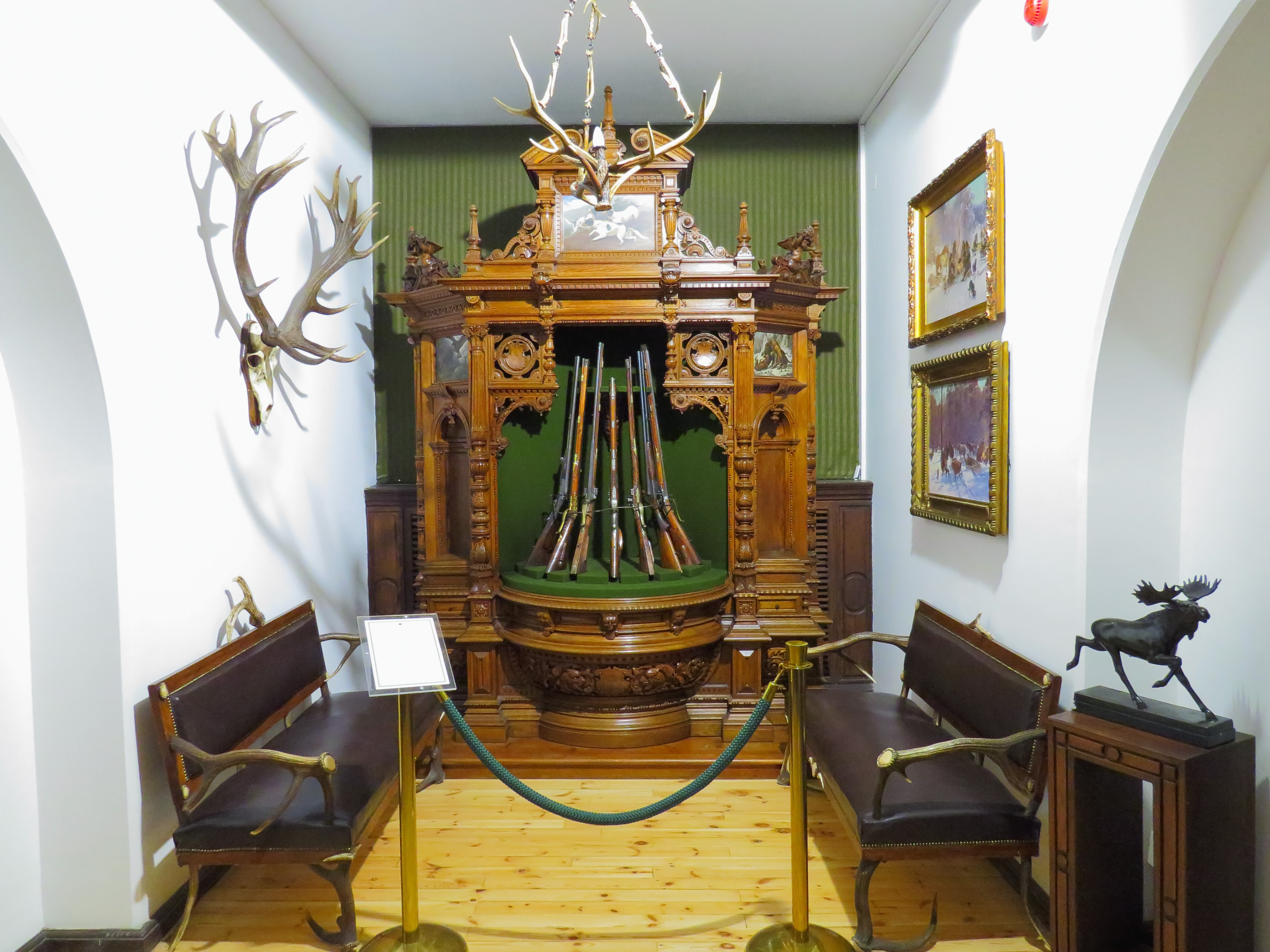

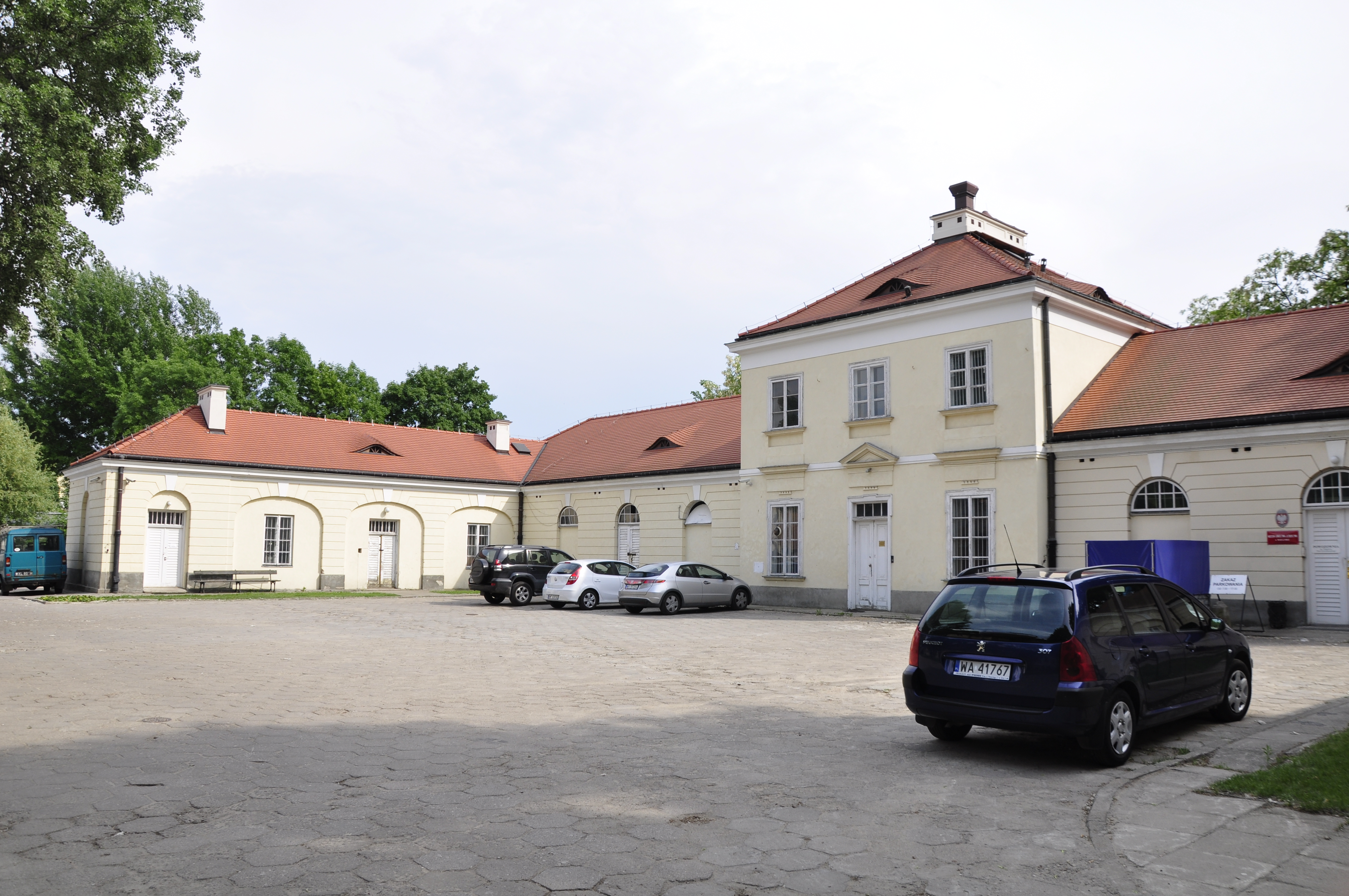

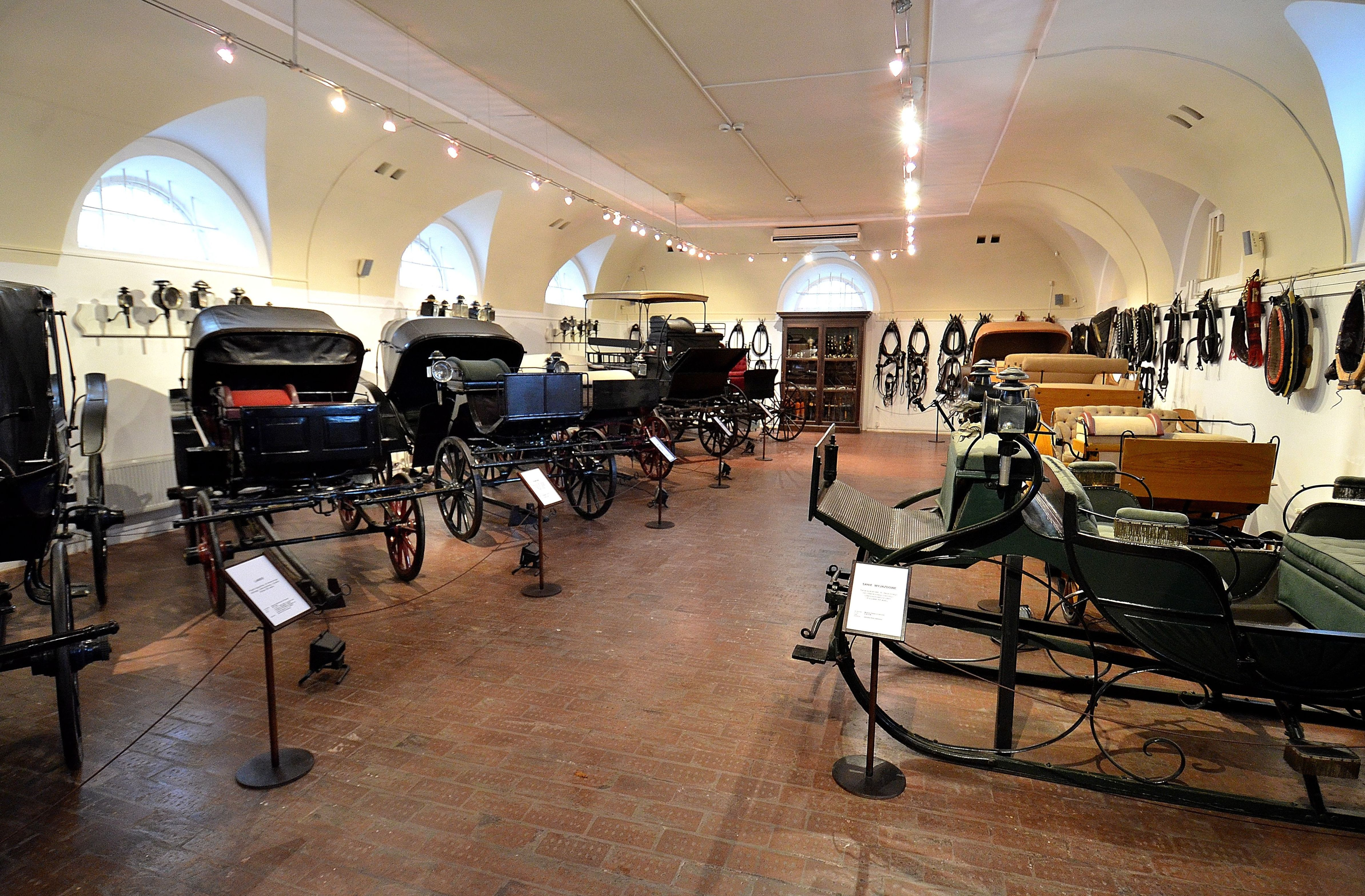
