= Neoclassical architecture in Poland =

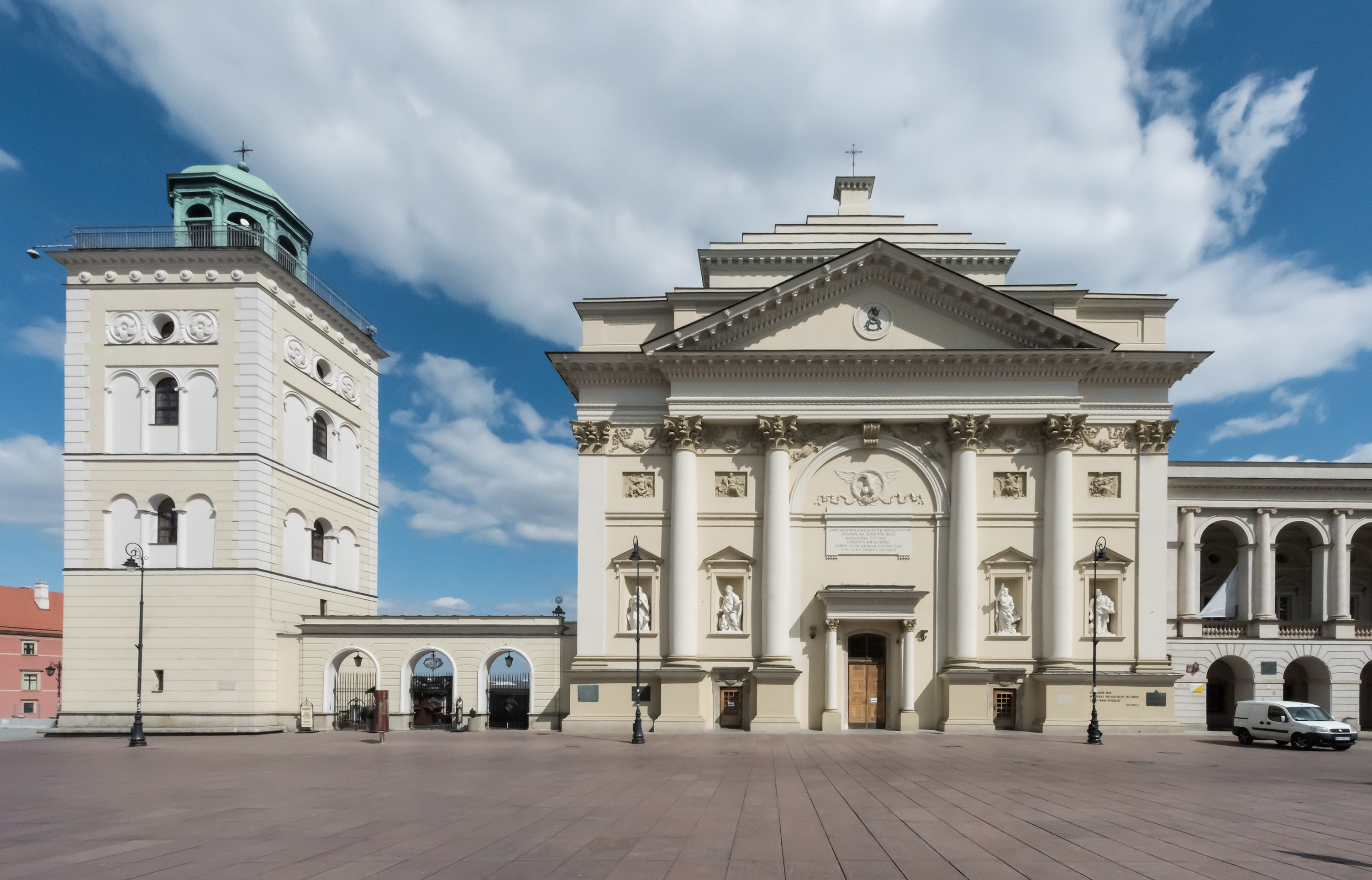
St. Anne's Church, Warsaw (1786)

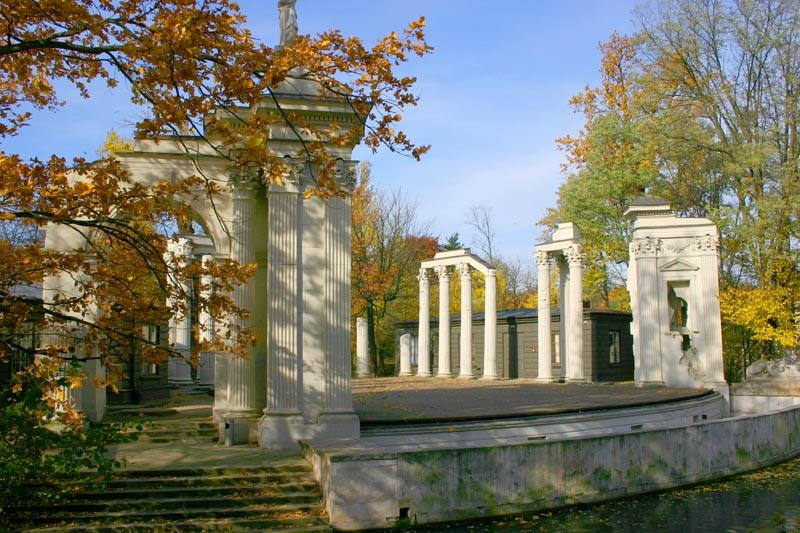
Roman theater on the Isle (1790–1793), a companion to the Palace on the Water

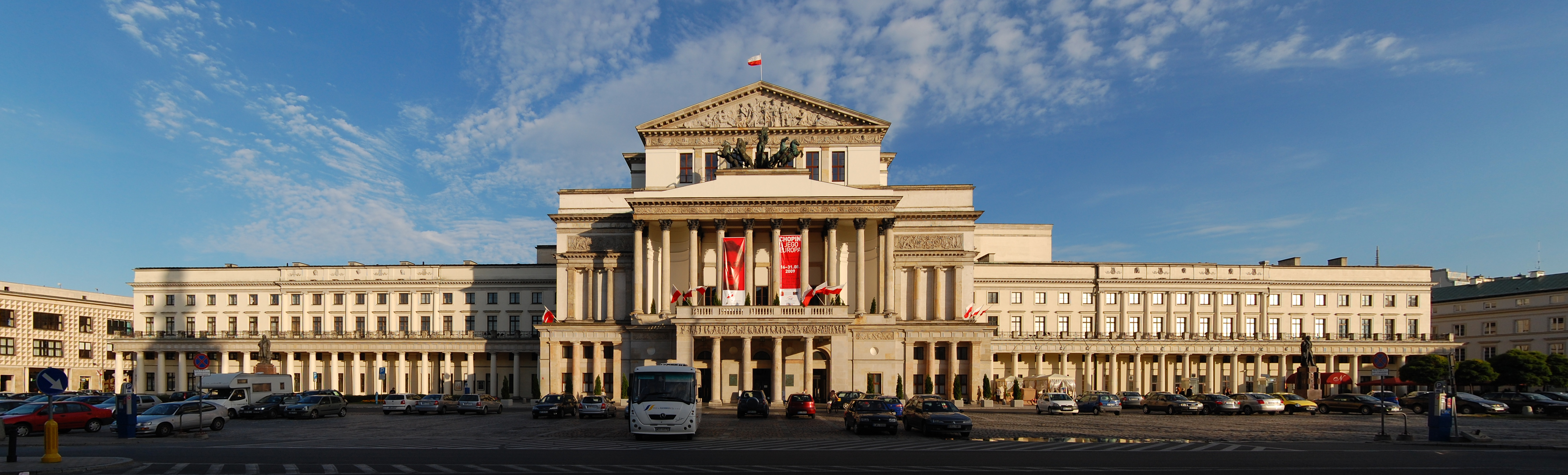
Grand Theatre, Warsaw (1825)

Neoclassical architecture in Poland was centered on Warsaw under the reign of Stanisław August Poniatowski, while the modern concept of a single capital city was to some extent inapplicable in the decentralized Polish–Lithuanian Commonwealth. Classicism came to Poland in the 18th century as the result of French infiltrations into the Polish milieu. The best-known architects and artists who worked in Poland were Dominik Merlini, Jan Chrystian Kamsetzer, Szymon Bogumił Zug, Stanisław Zawadzki, Efraim Szreger, Antonio Corazzi, Jakub Kubicki, Hilary Szpilowski, Christian Piotr Aigner, Wawrzyniec Gucewicz, Bonifacy Witkowski and Danish Bertel Thorvaldsen.

The first stage, called the Stanislavian style, followed by an almost complete inhibition and a period known as the Congress Kingdom classicism. The palladian patterns were independently interpreted by Szymon Bogumił Zug, who followed an influence of radical French classicism. A palladian by influence was also Piotr Aigner - architect of the façade of St. Anne's Church, Warsaw (1786–1788) and St. Alexander Church (1818–1826). Palladian ideas were implemented in a popular type of a palace with a pillared portico.

The most famous buildings of the Stanislavian period include the Royal Castle, Warsaw, rebuilt by Dominik Merlini and Jan Christian Kamsetzer, Palace on the Water, Królikarnia and the palace in Jabłonna. Kamsetzer erected the Amphitheatre in the Royal Baths Park and the Warsaw palaces of the Raczyńskis and Tyszkiewiczs as well as the palace in Iskierniki. Among the most notable works by Szymon Bogumił Zug is a palace in Natolin and Holy Trinity Church and gardens: Solec, Powązki, Mokotów and Arcadia near Nieborów.

From the period of the Congress Kingdom are Koniecpolski Palace and the St. Alexander's Church, Warsaw, the Temple of the Sibyl in Puławy, rebuilding the Łańcut Castle. The leading figure in the Congress Kingdom was Antonio Corrazzi. Corazzi created the complex of Bank Square in Warsaw, the Palace of the Ministry of Revenues and Treasury, the building of the Staszic Palace, Mostowski Palace and designed the Grand Theatre. Belvedere and Pawłowice were created by Jakub Kubicki, while Lubostroń Palace and Dobrzyca Palace by Stanisław Zawadzki. The notable town halls in Łowicz, Płock, Błonie, Konin and Aleksandrów Łódzki are dating back the first half of the nineteenth century.

== Stanislavian classicism gallery ==
Palaces

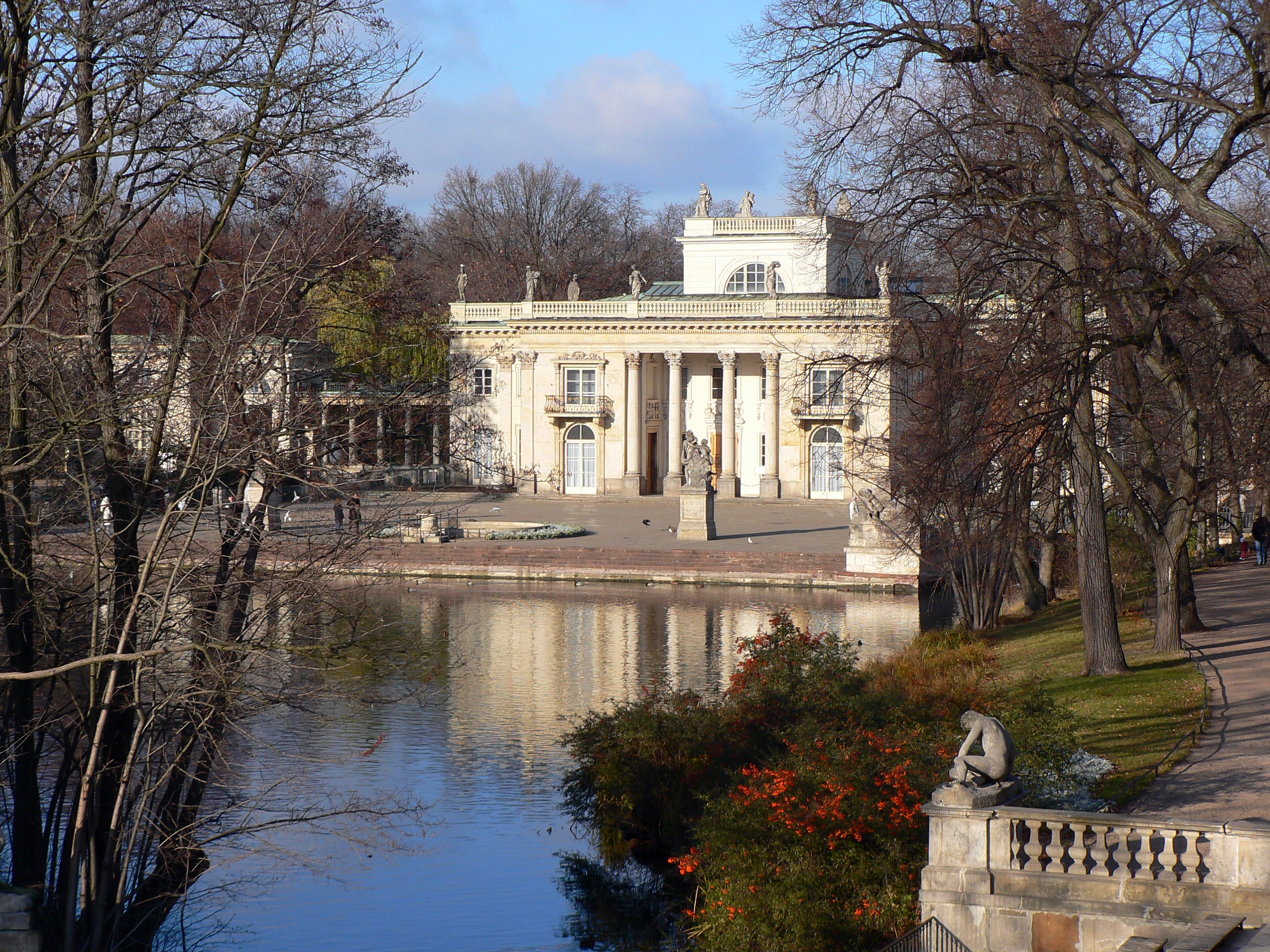
Łazienki Palace in Warsaw, 1764–1795

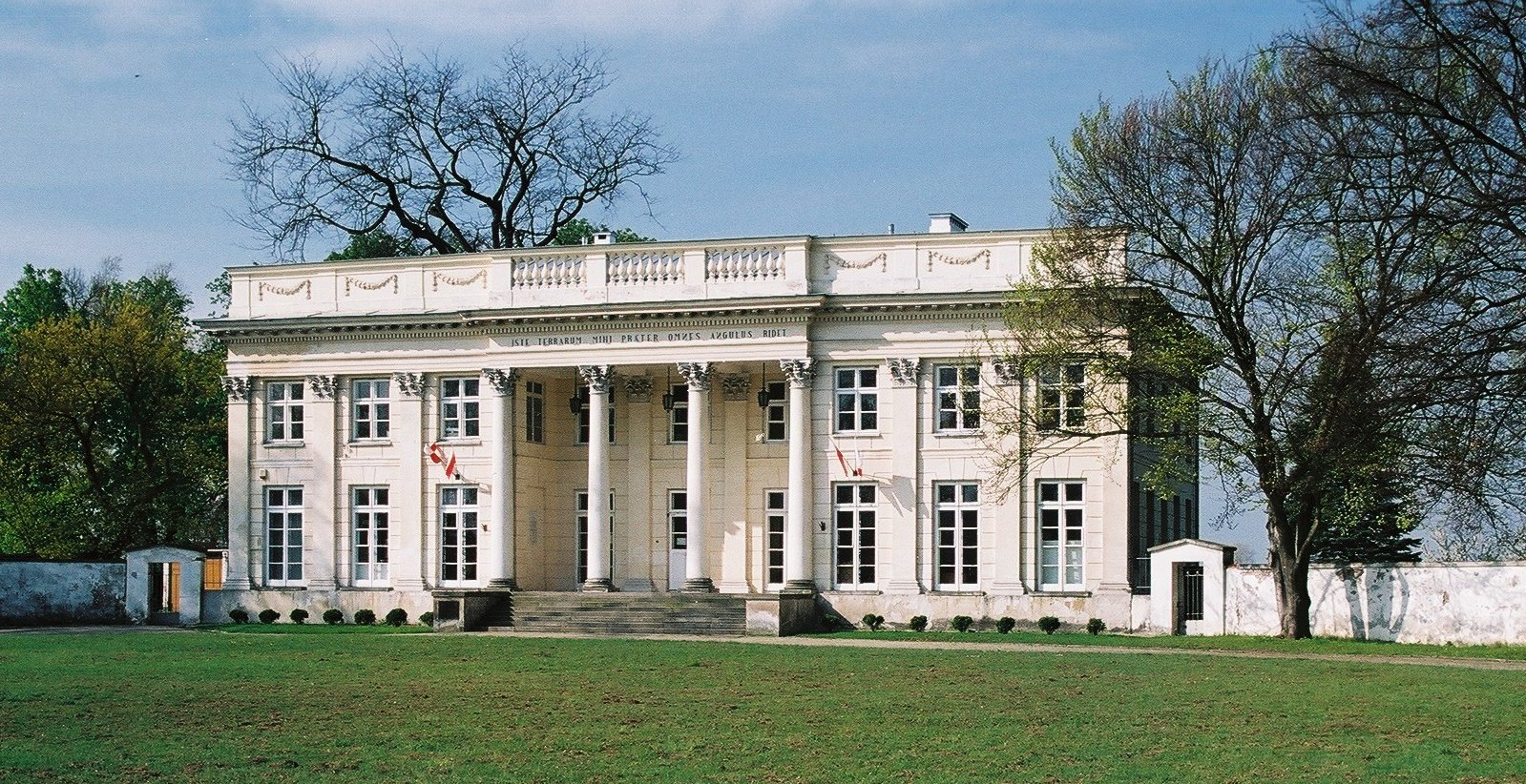
Marynka Palace in Puławy, 1790–1794

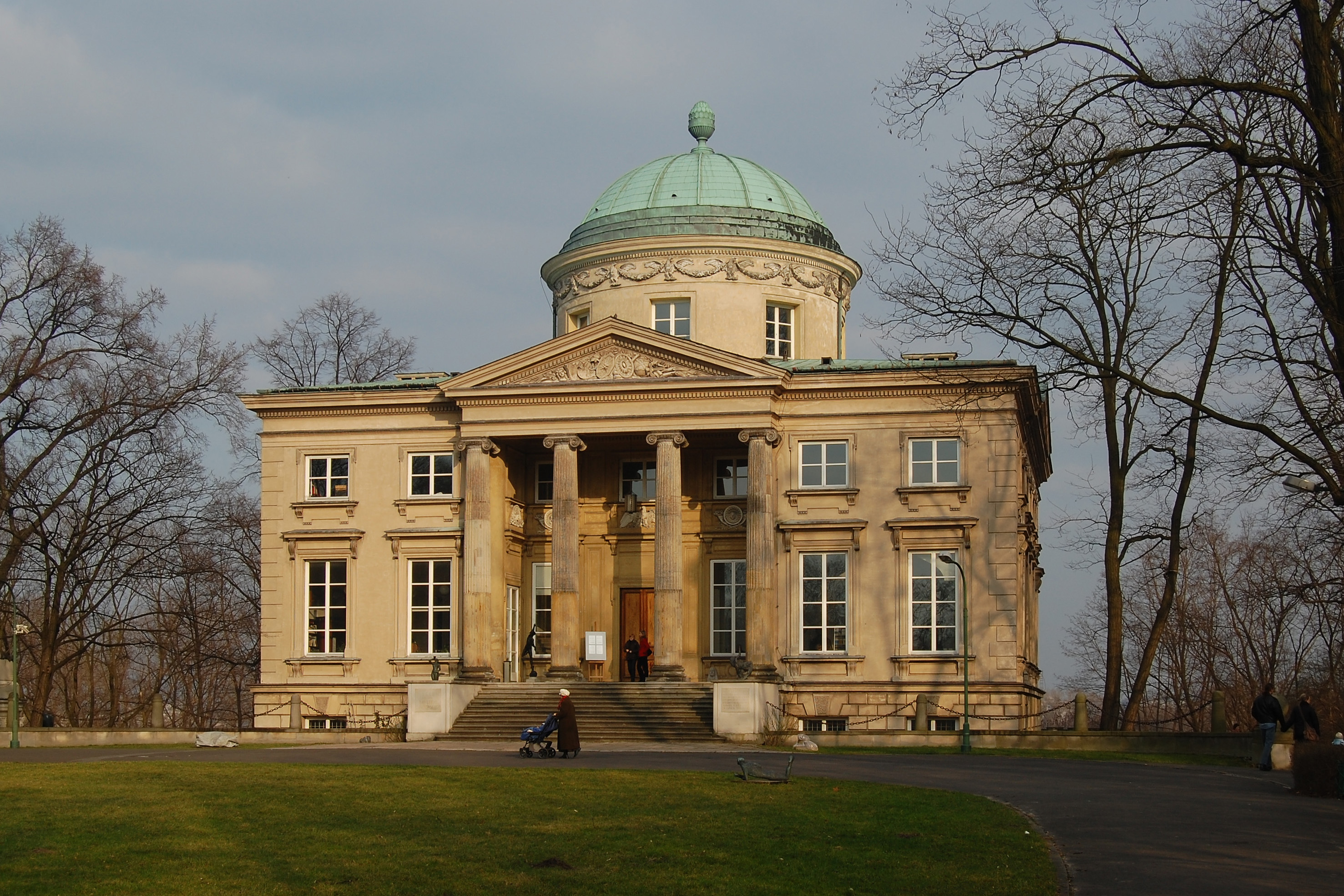
Królikarnia Palace in Warsaw, 1782–1786

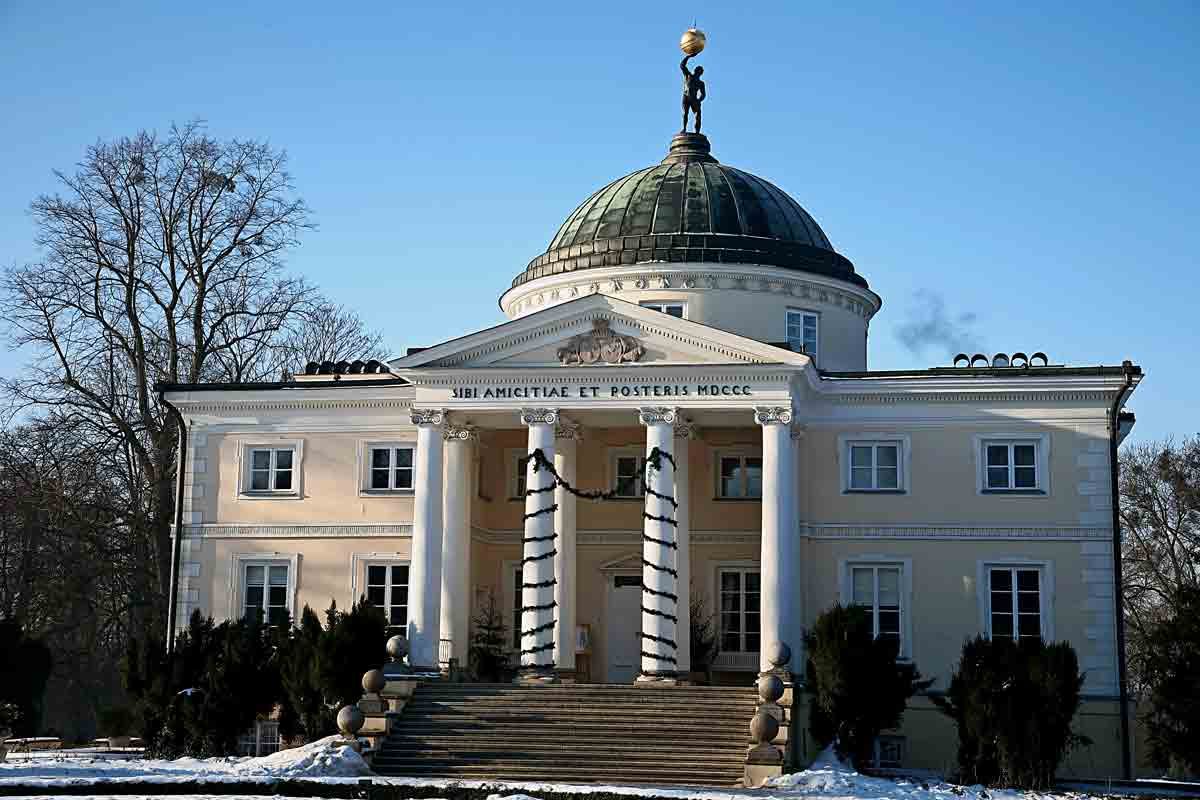
Skórzewski Palace in Lubostroń, 1795–1800

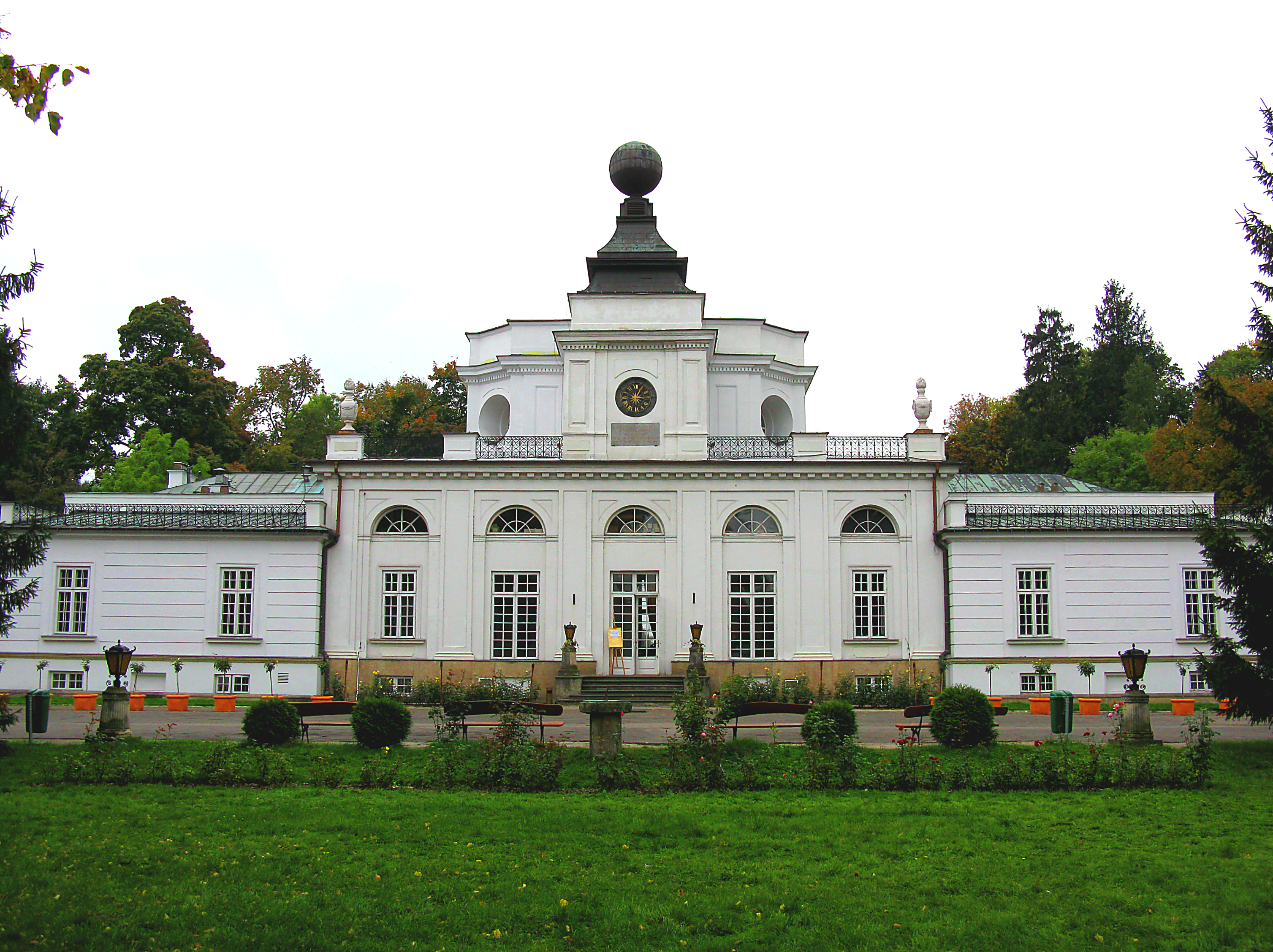
Poniatowski Palace in Jabłonna, 1775–1779

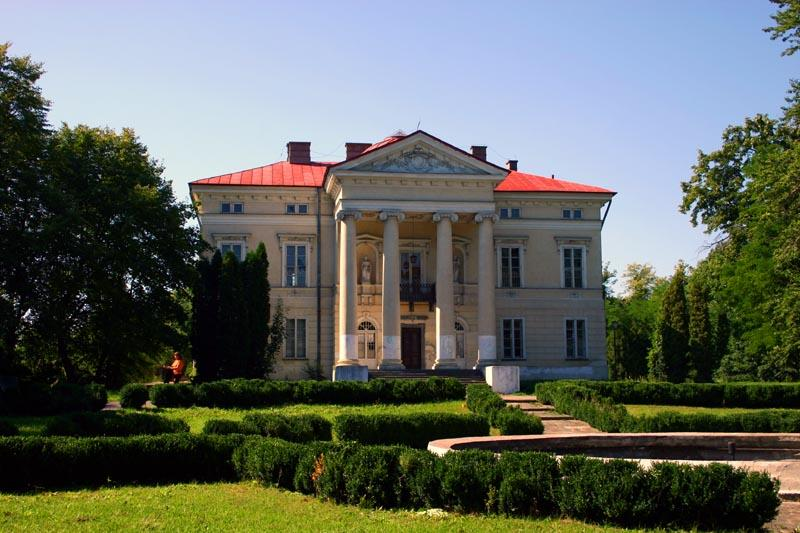
Lubomirski Palace in Niezdów, 1776–1804

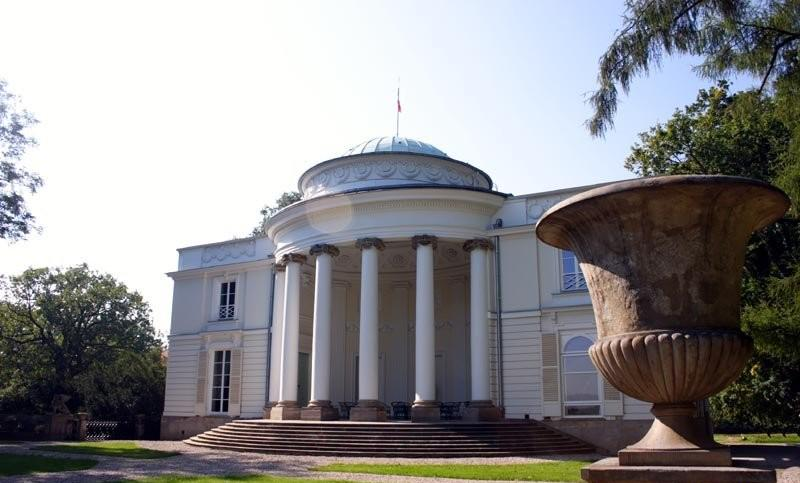
Potocki Palace in Natolin, 1780–1782

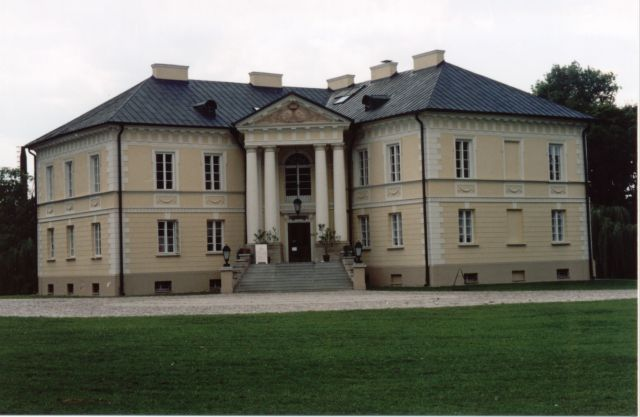
Gorzeński Palace in Dobrzyca, 1795–1799
Churches

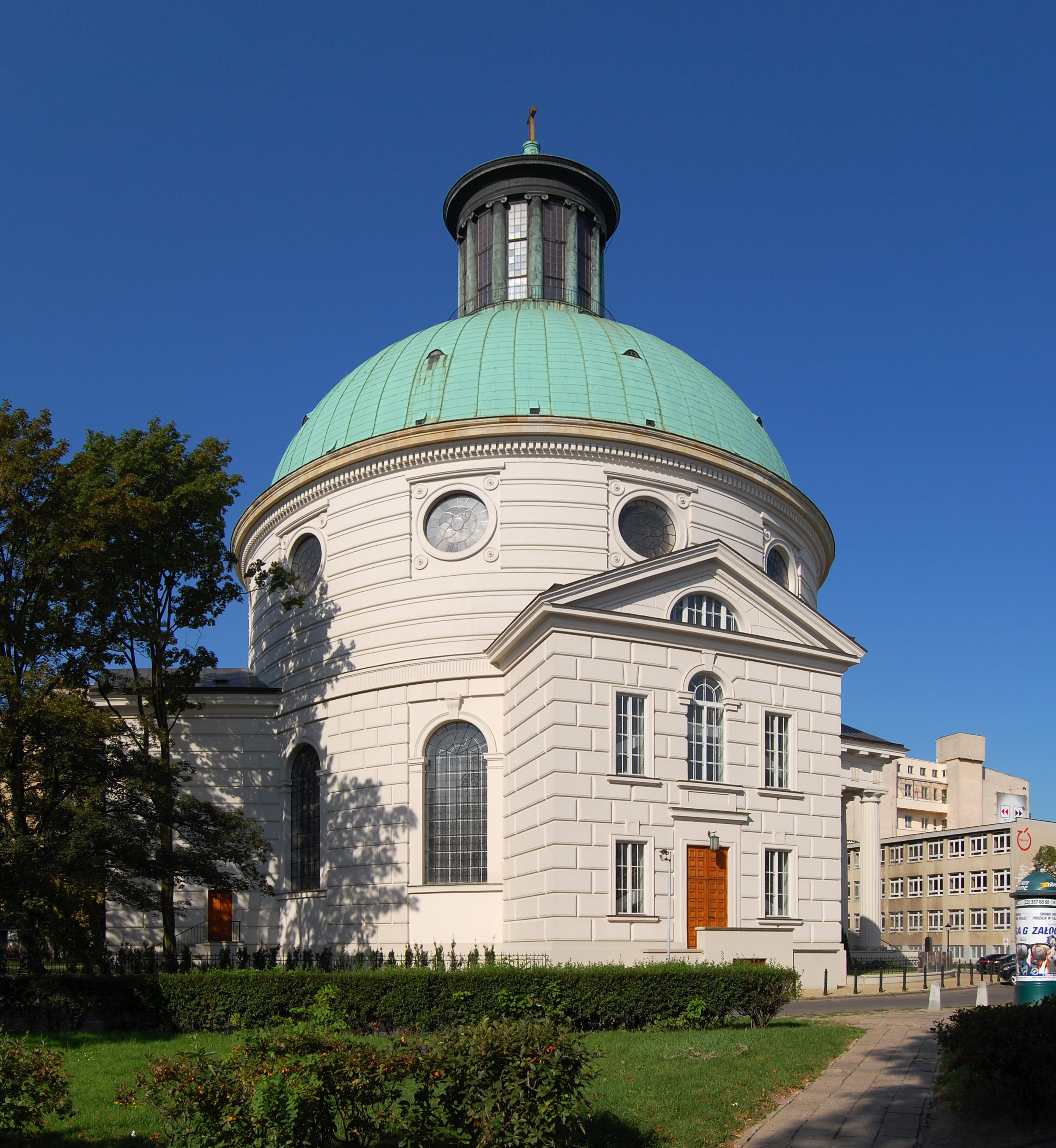
Holy Trinity Church, Warsaw, 1777–1782

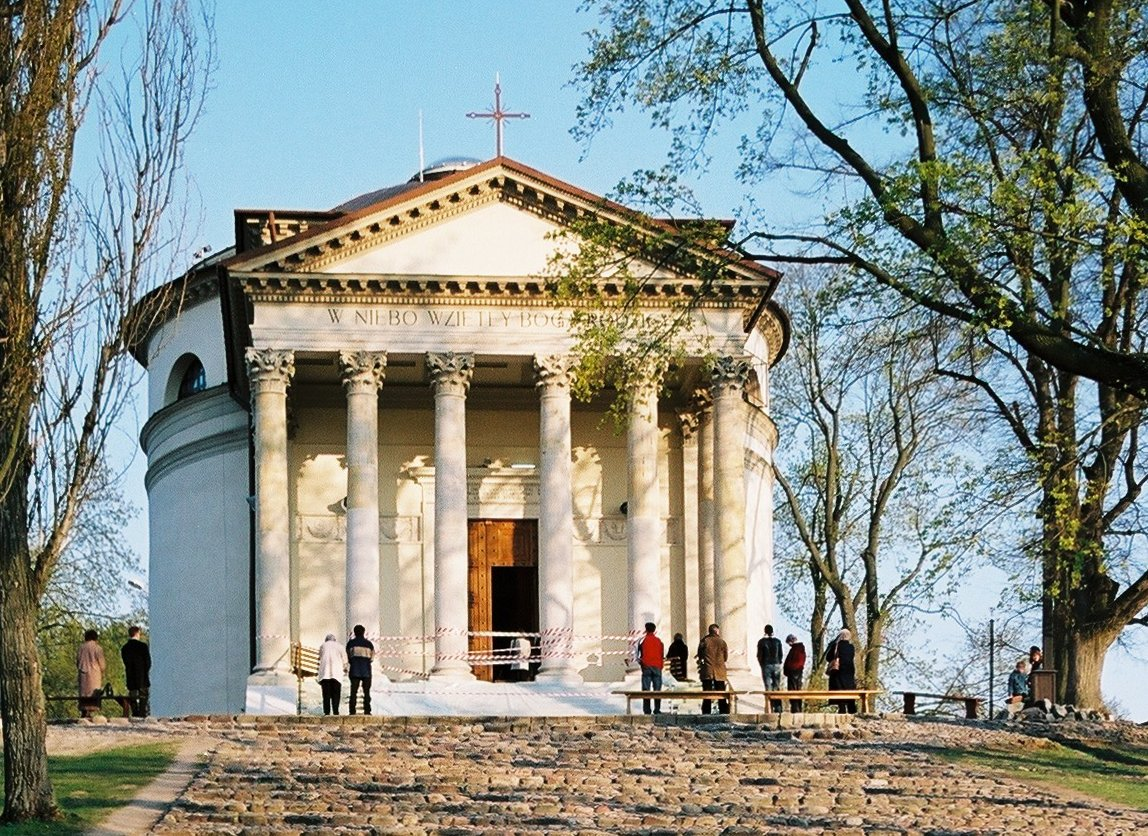
Church of the Assumption of Mary in Puławy, 1801–1803
Park structures

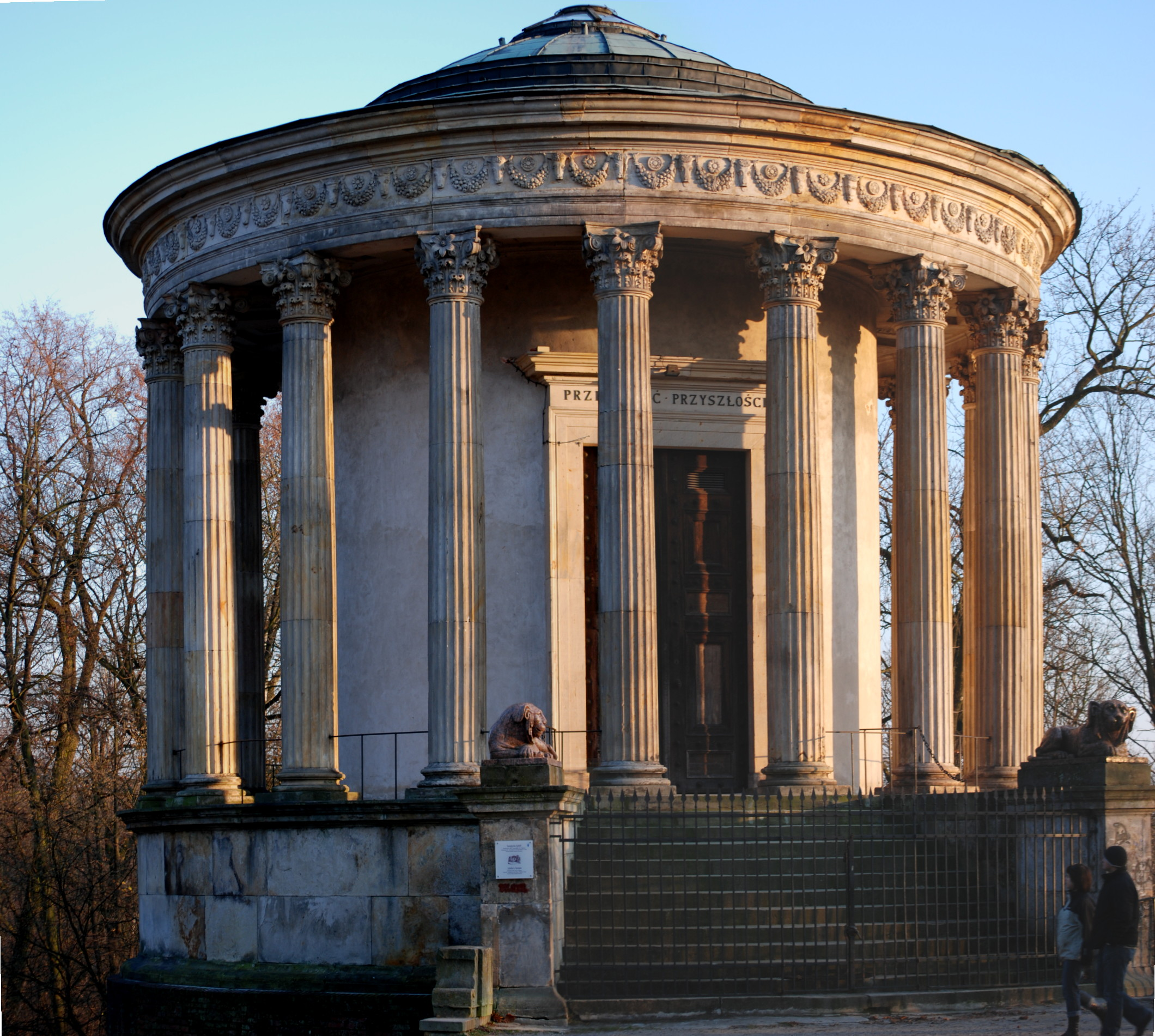
Sybil Temple in Puławy, 1798–1801

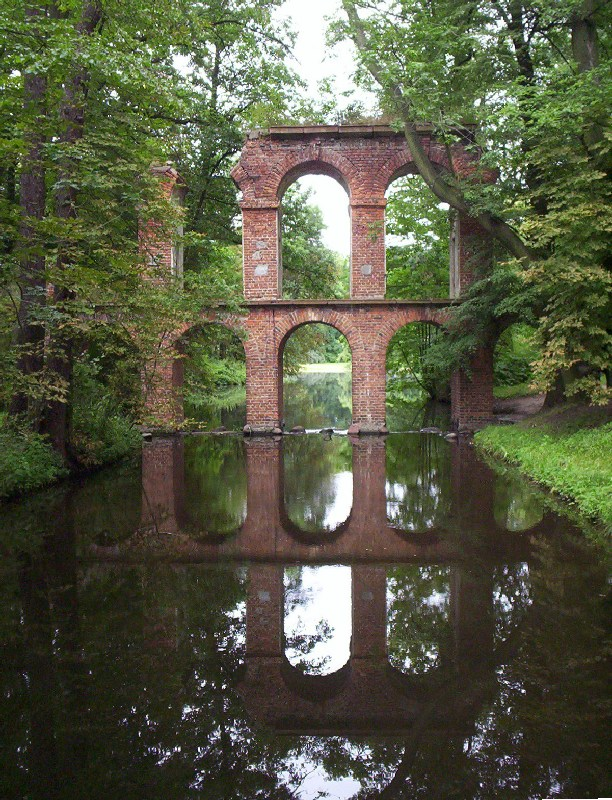
The Aqueduct in Arkadia (Nieborów), 1784

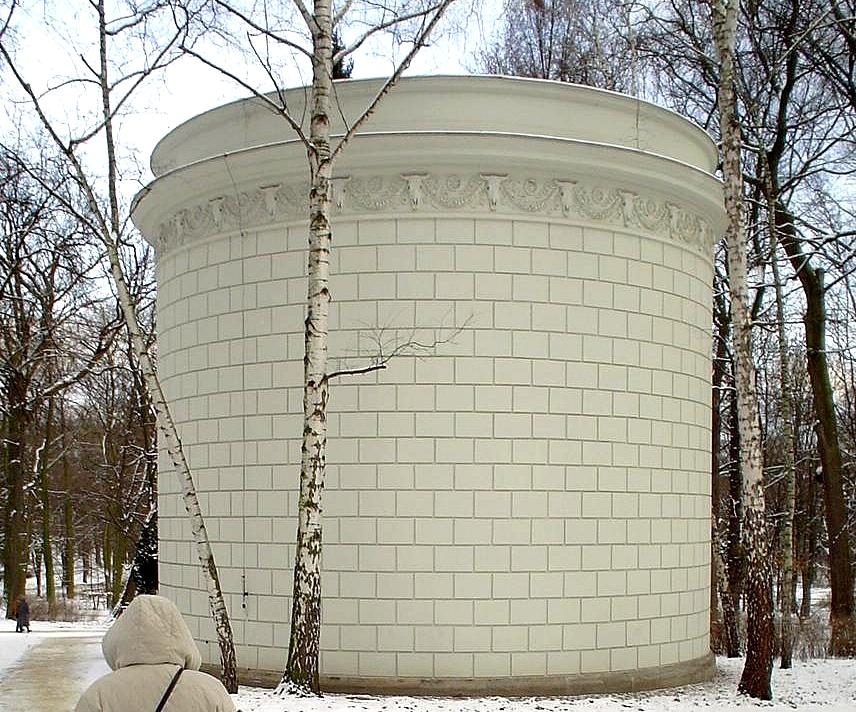
Water Tower in the Royal Baths (Warsaw), 1777–1778

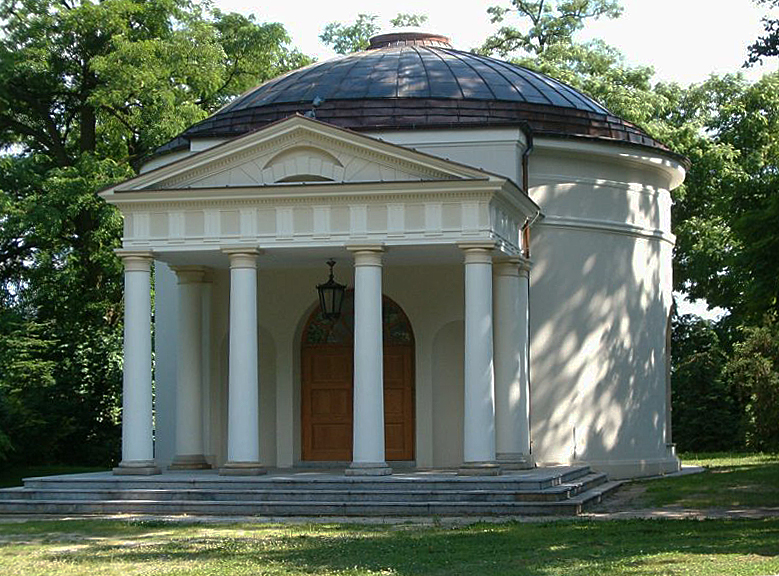
Panteon in Dobrzyca, before 1806
City structures

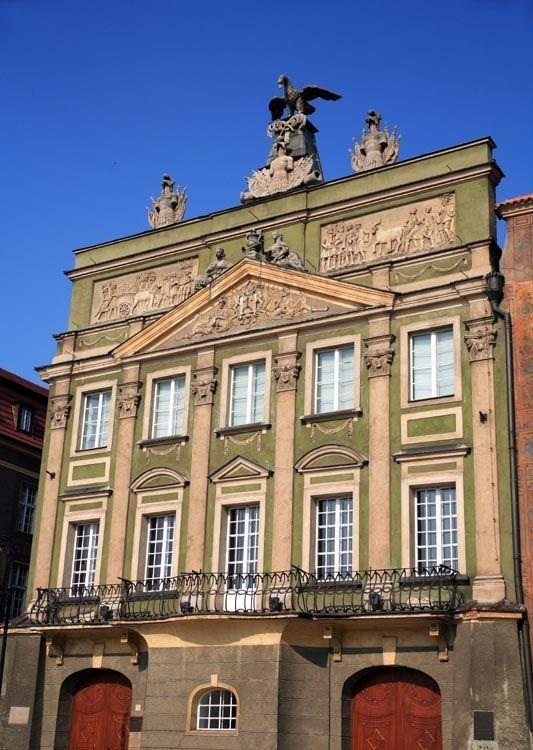
Działyński House in Poznań, 1773–1776

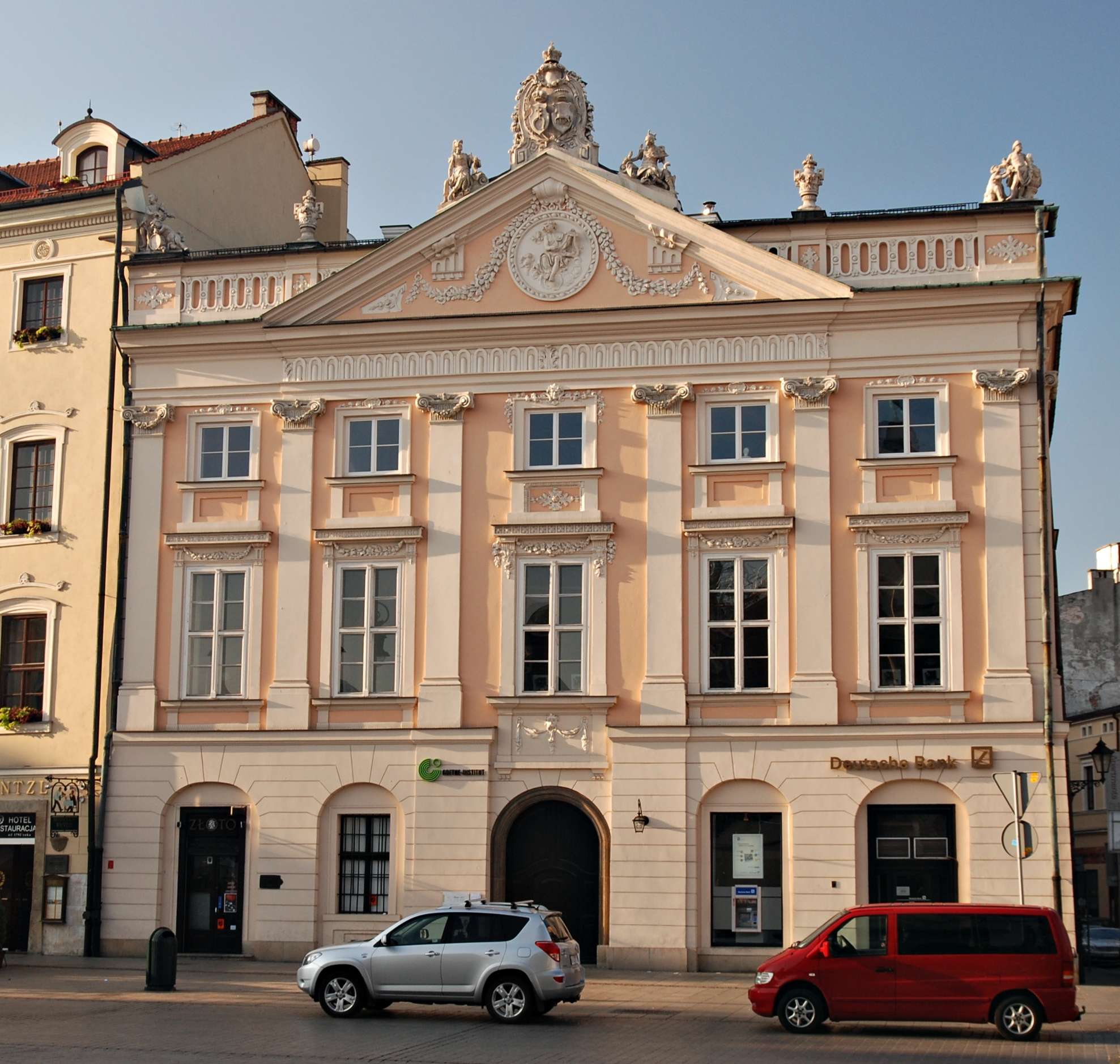
Zbaraski House in Kraków, 1777–1783

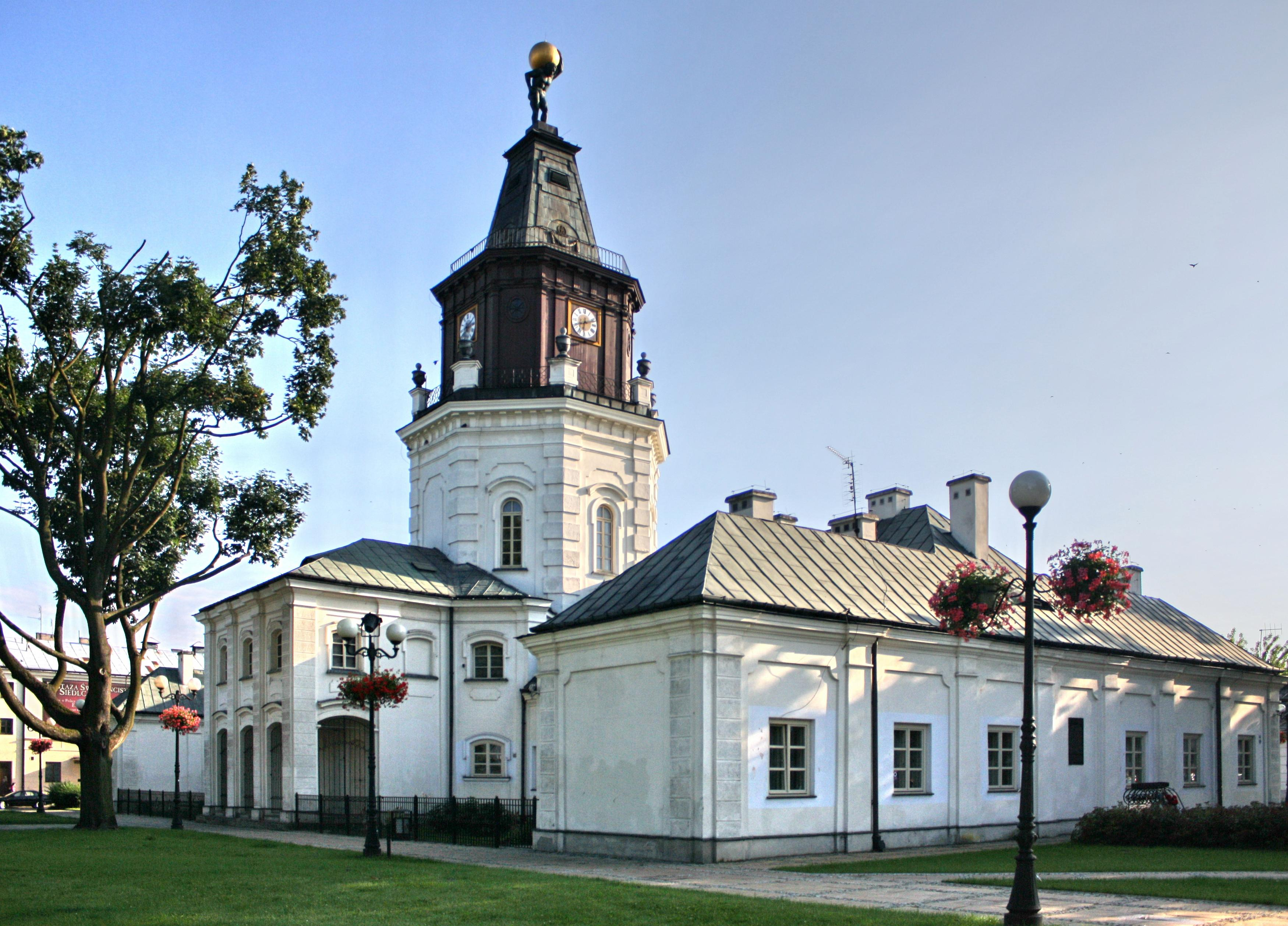
Town Hall in Siedlce, 1766–1769

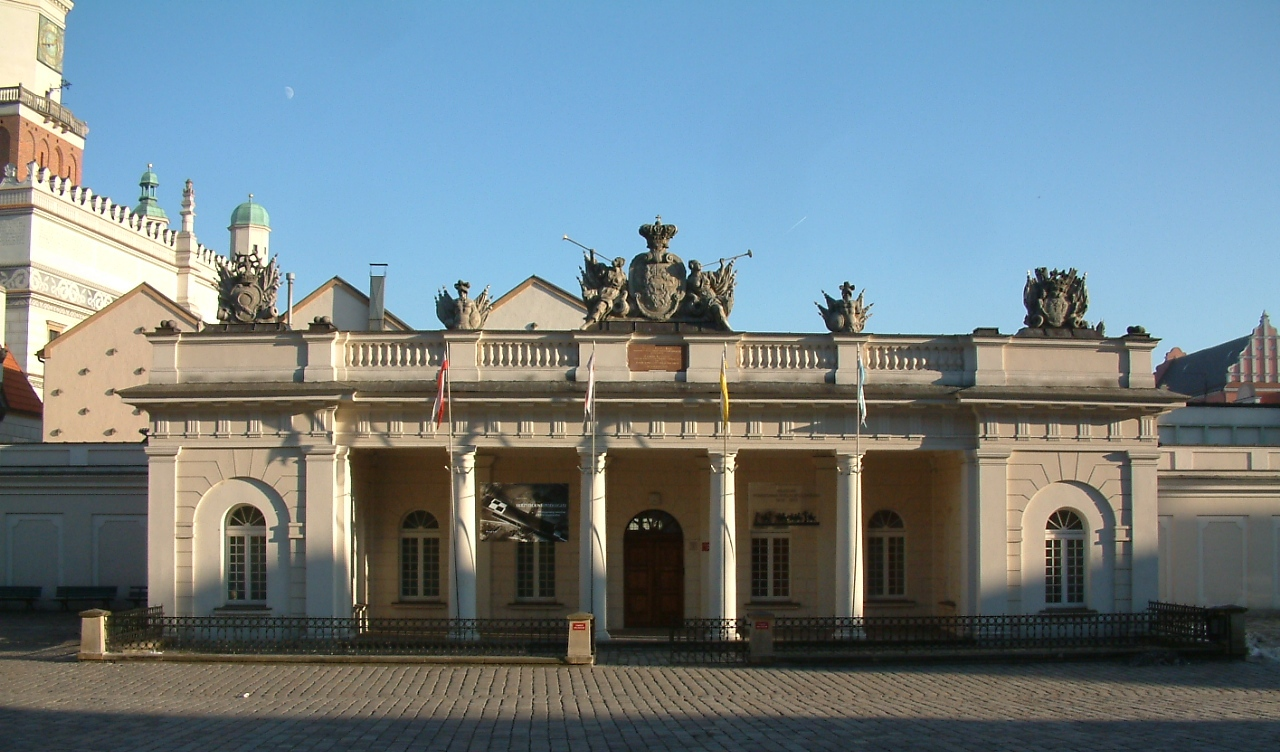
Guard Building in Poznań, 1783–1787

== Congress Kingdom classicism gallery ==
Palaces

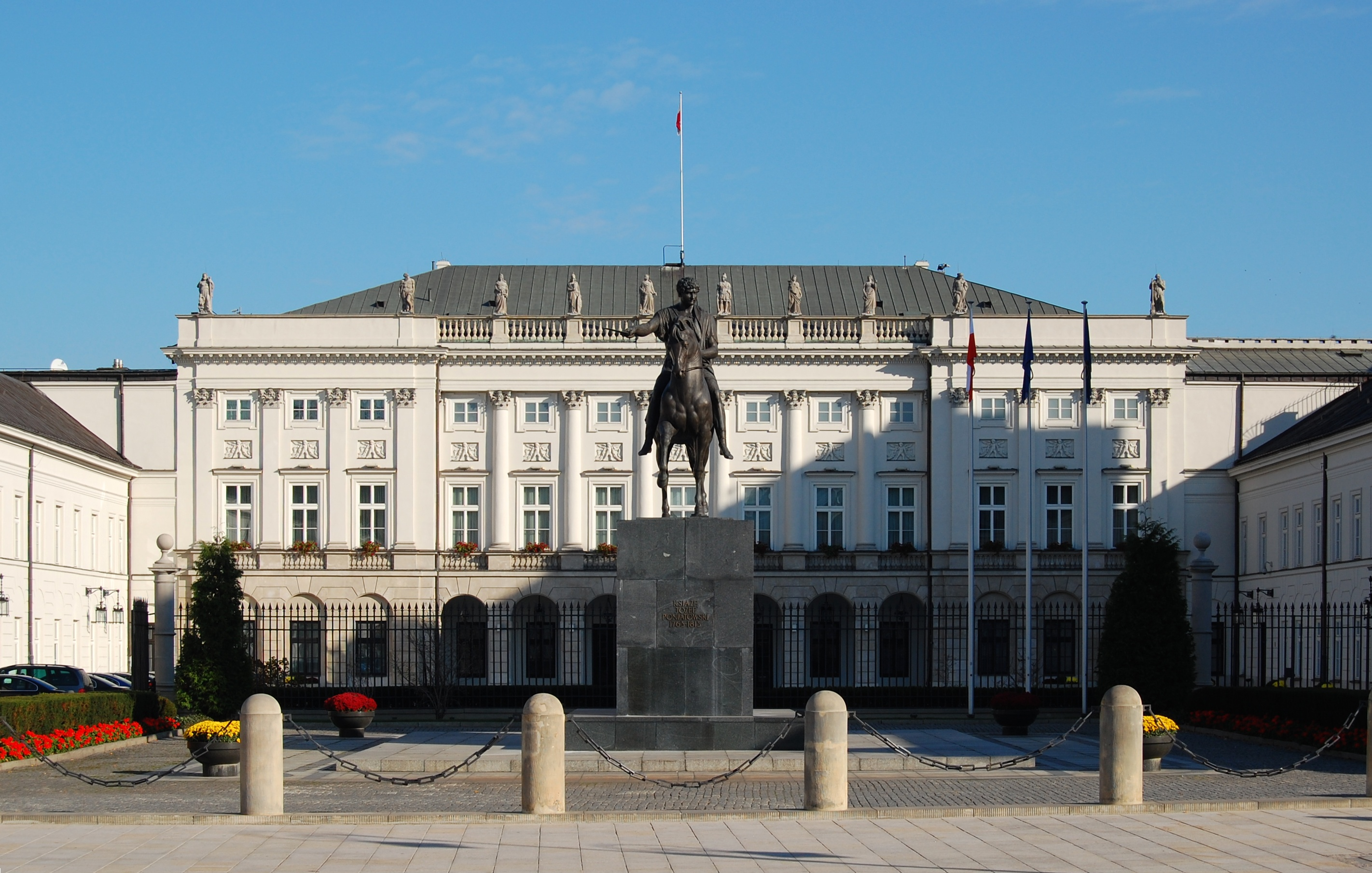
Presidential Palace in Warsaw, 1818

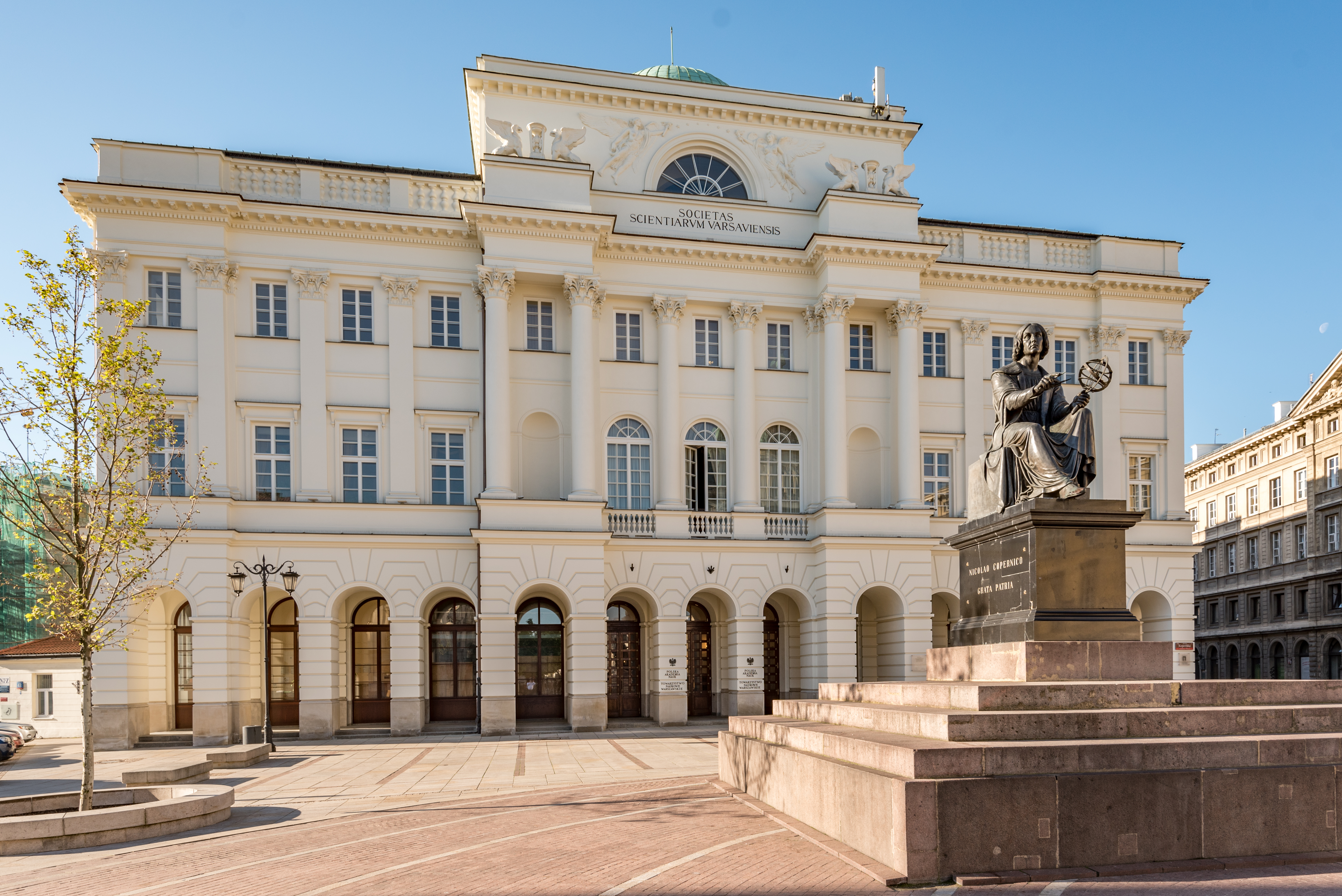
Staszic Palace in Warsaw, 1820–1823

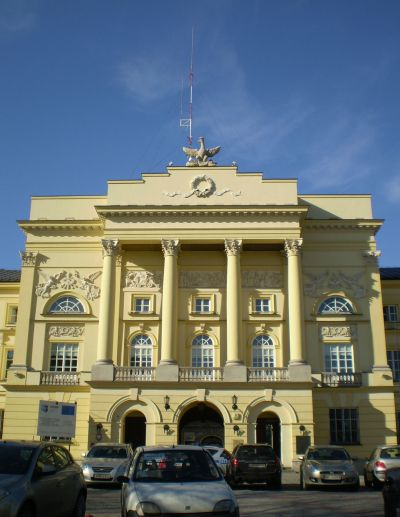
Mostowski Palace in Warsaw, 1823–1824

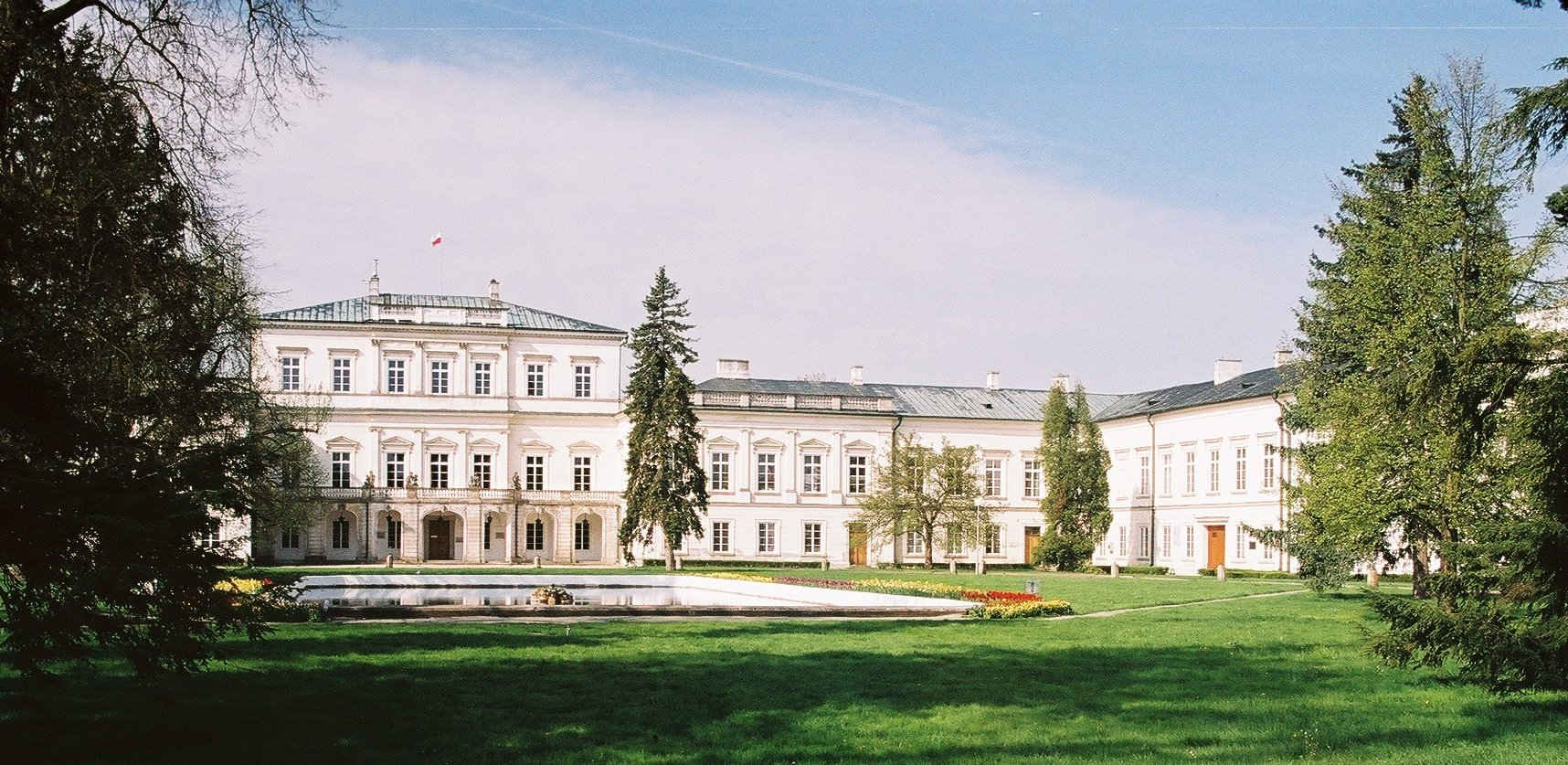
Czartoryski Palace (Puławy), 1840–1843
Public edifices

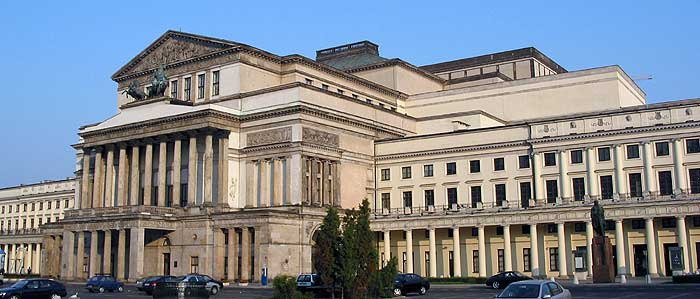
Great Theatre, Warsaw, 1825–1833

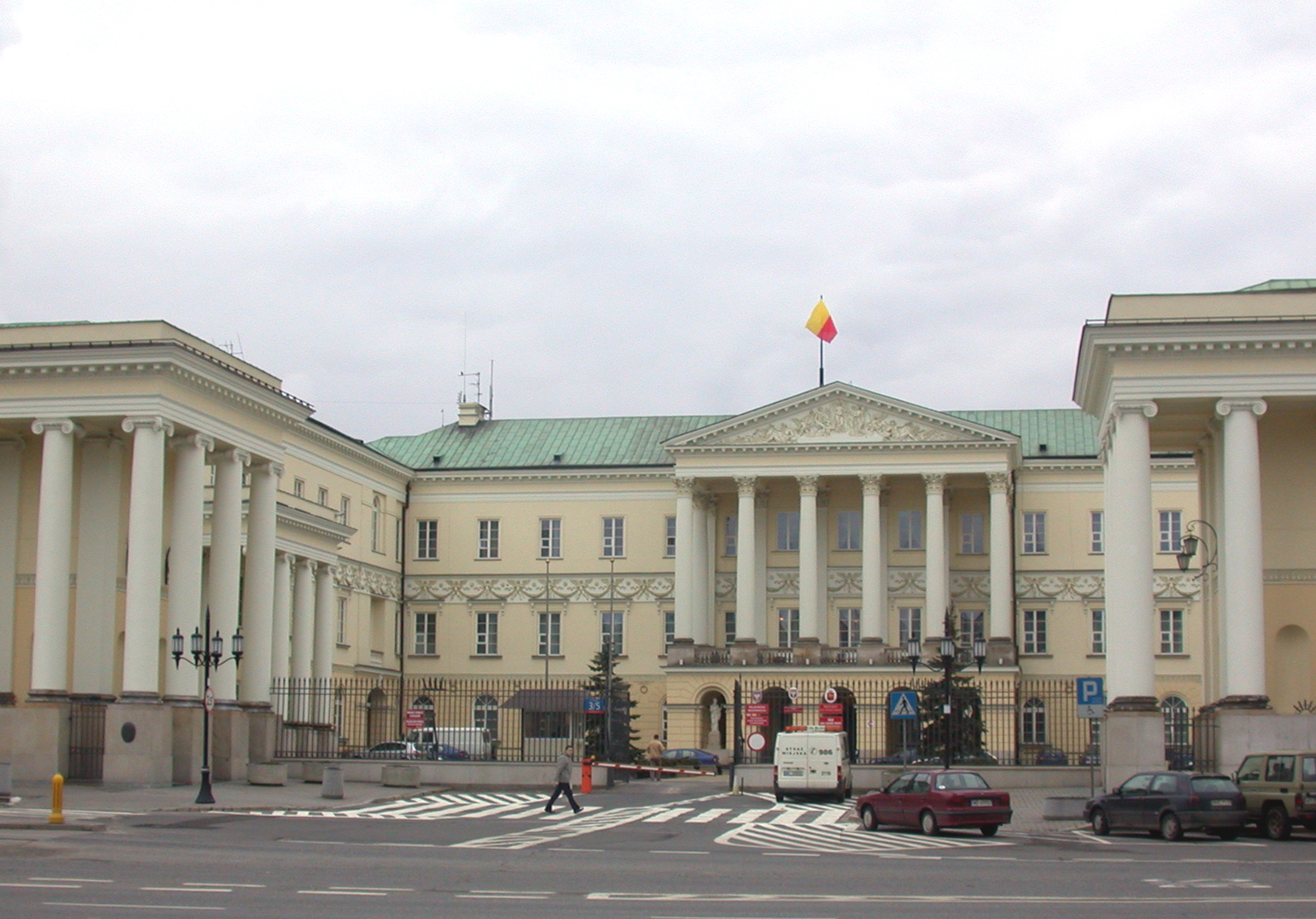
Commission Palace in Warsaw, 1823–1825

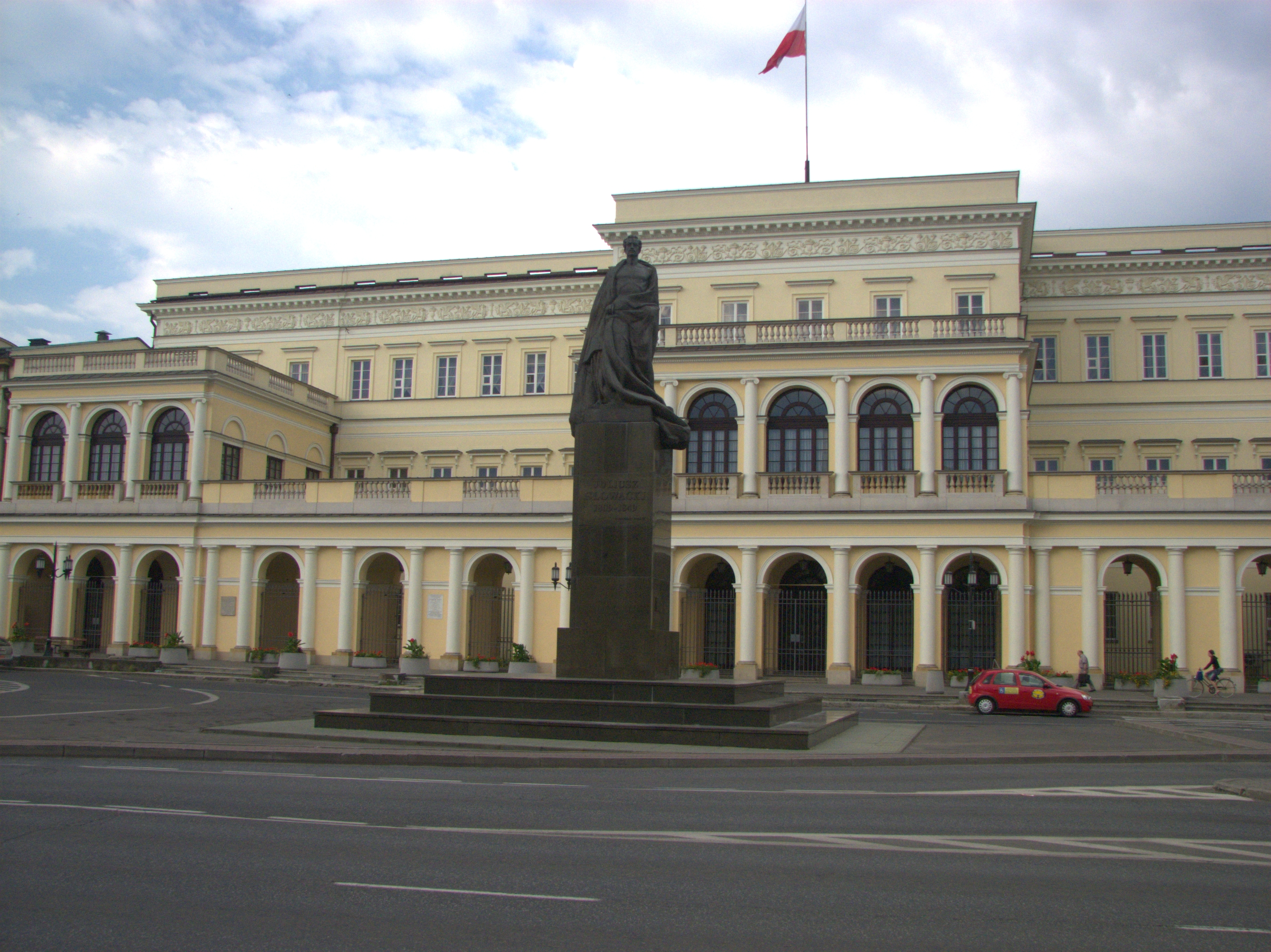
Ministry of Treasury in Warsaw, 1825–1828

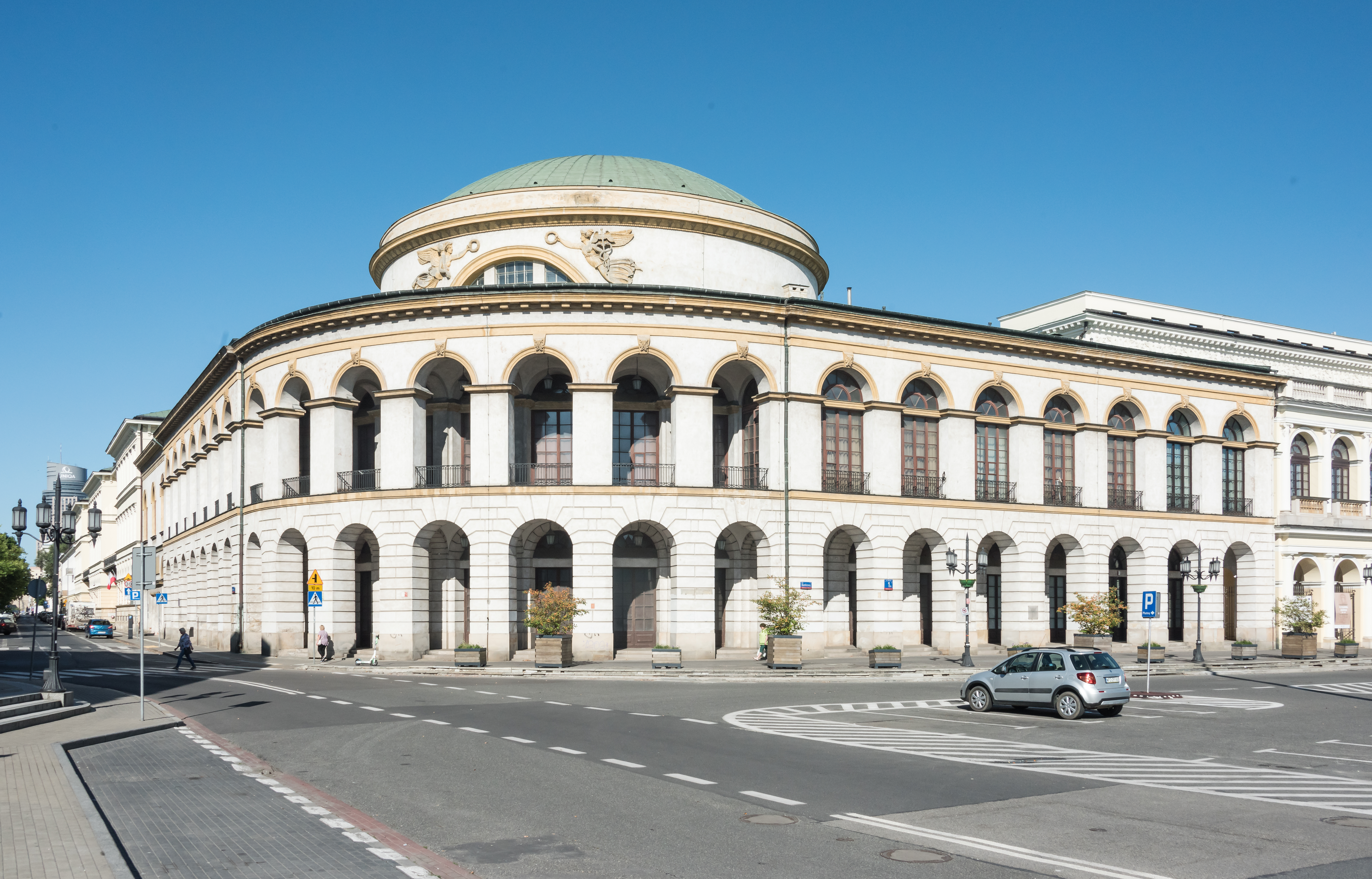
Bank Polski in Warsaw, 1825–1828

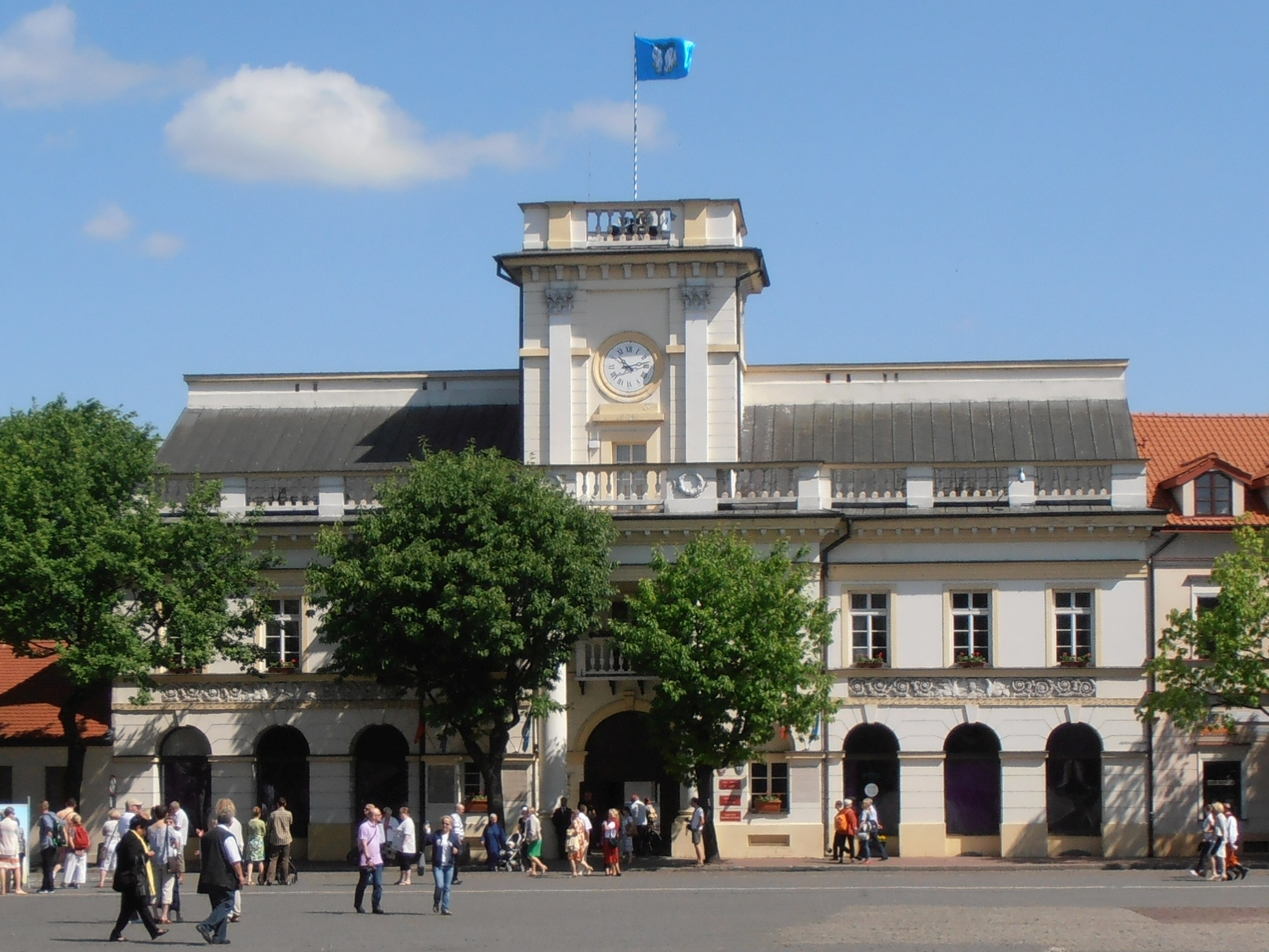
Town hall in Łowicz, 1825–1828

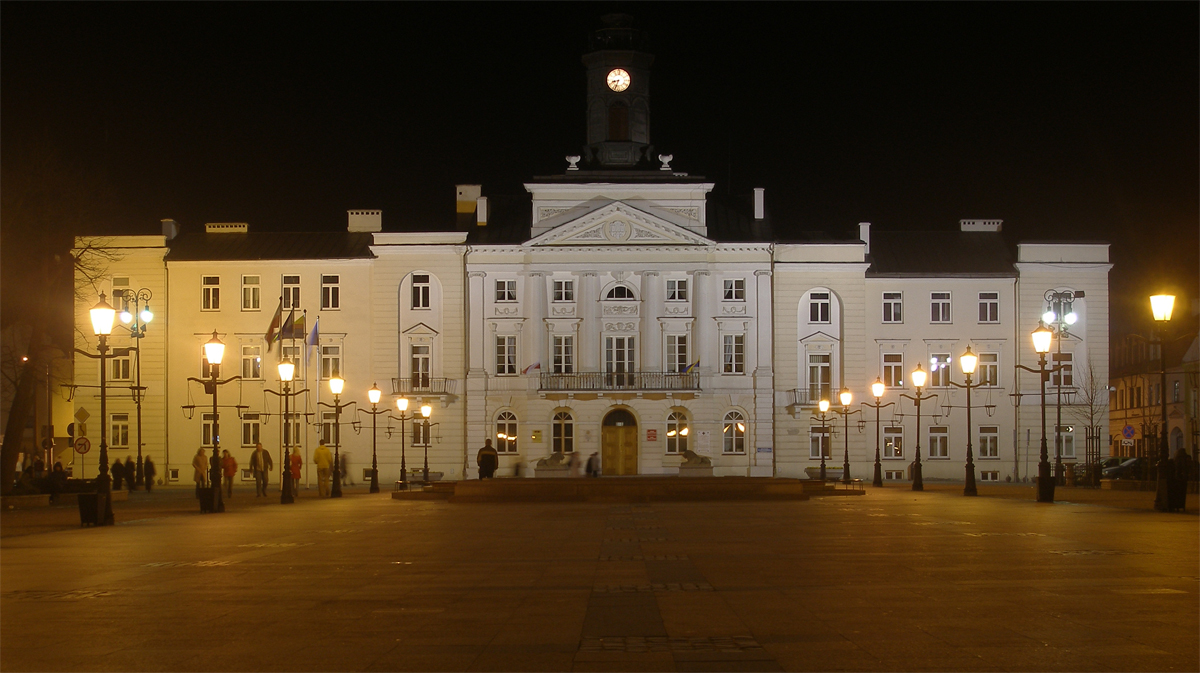
Town hall in Płock, 1816–1827

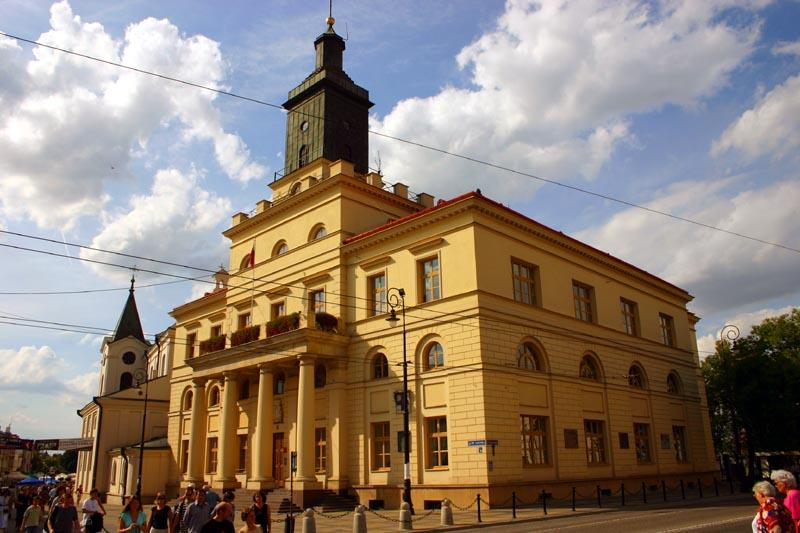
Lublin New Town Hall, 1827–1828

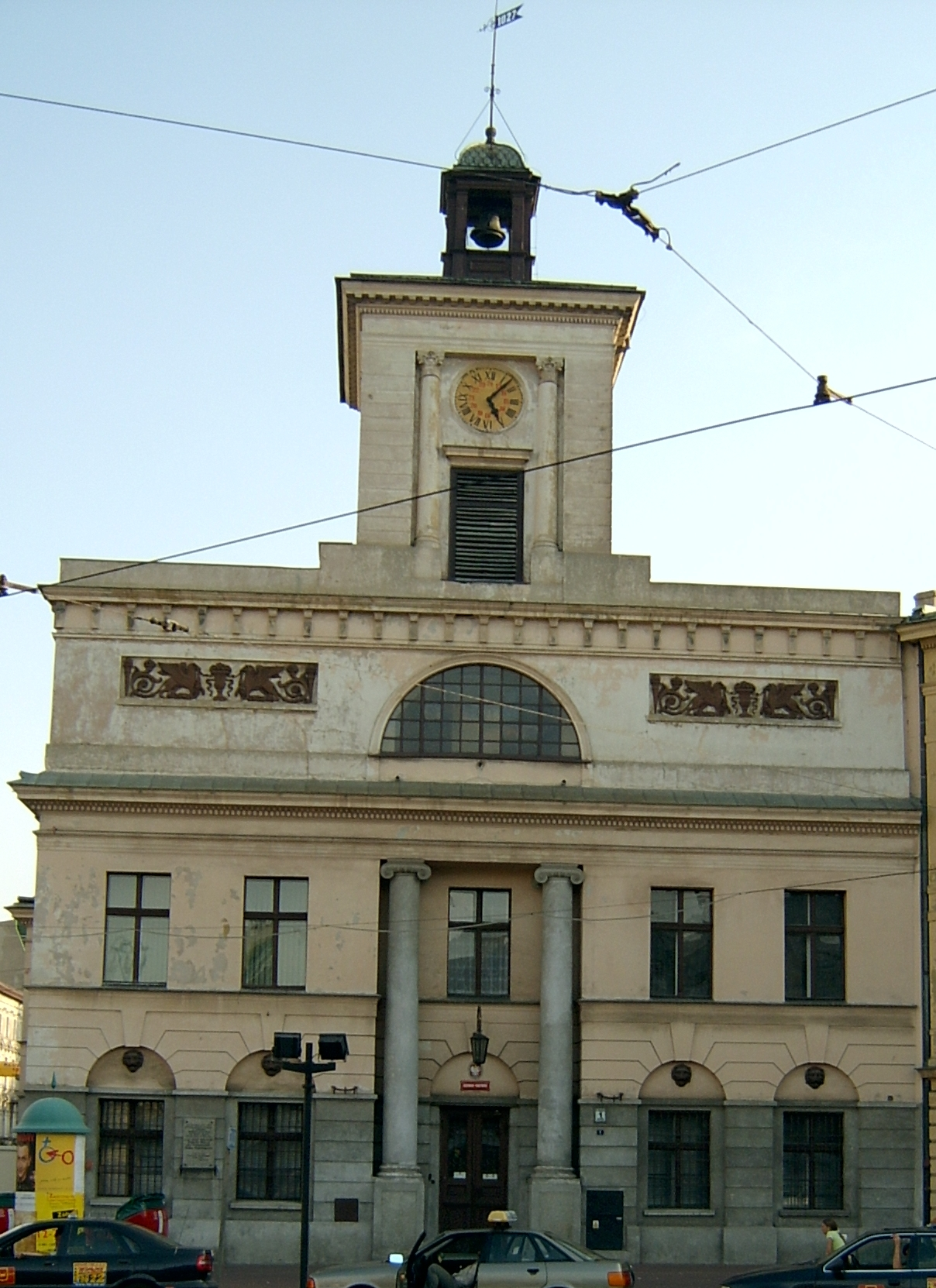
City hall in Łódź, 1826–1827
Churches

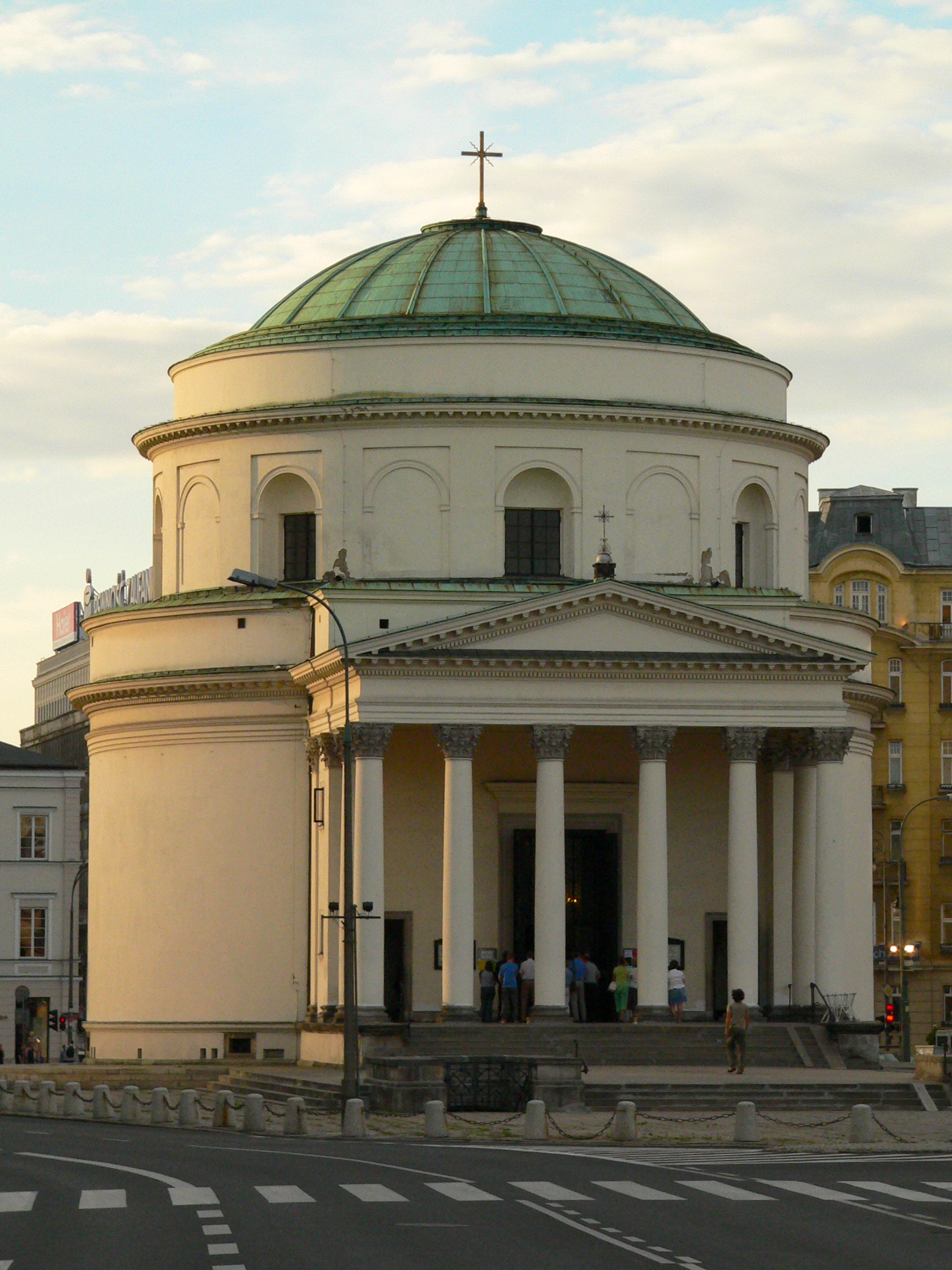
St. Alexander's Church, Warsaw, 1818–1825

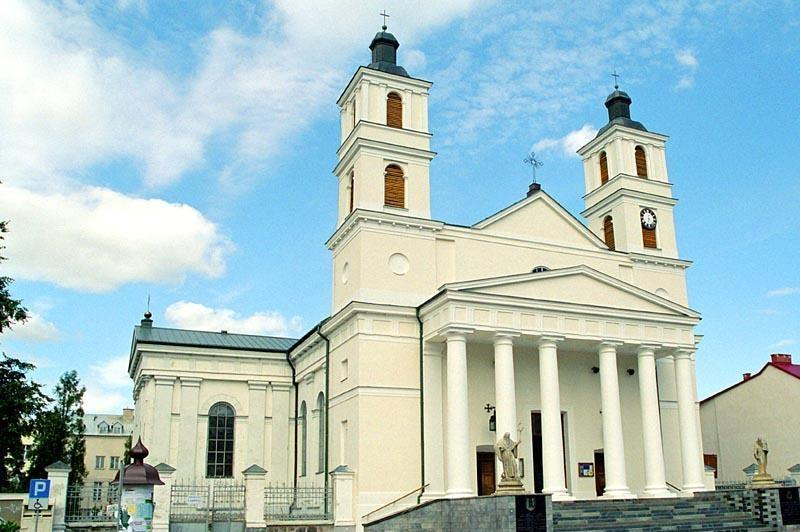
St. Alexander's Church in Suwałki, 1820–1829

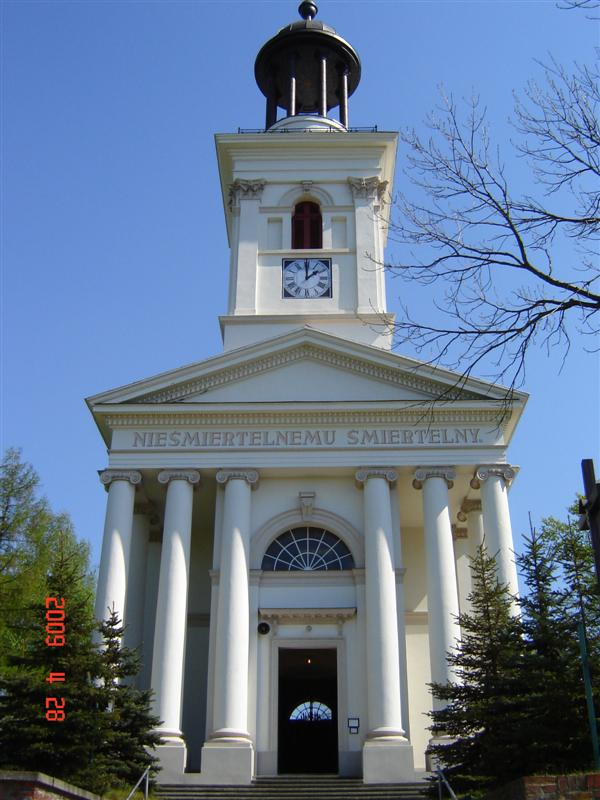
St. John the Baptist's Church in Brzostków, 1839–1840

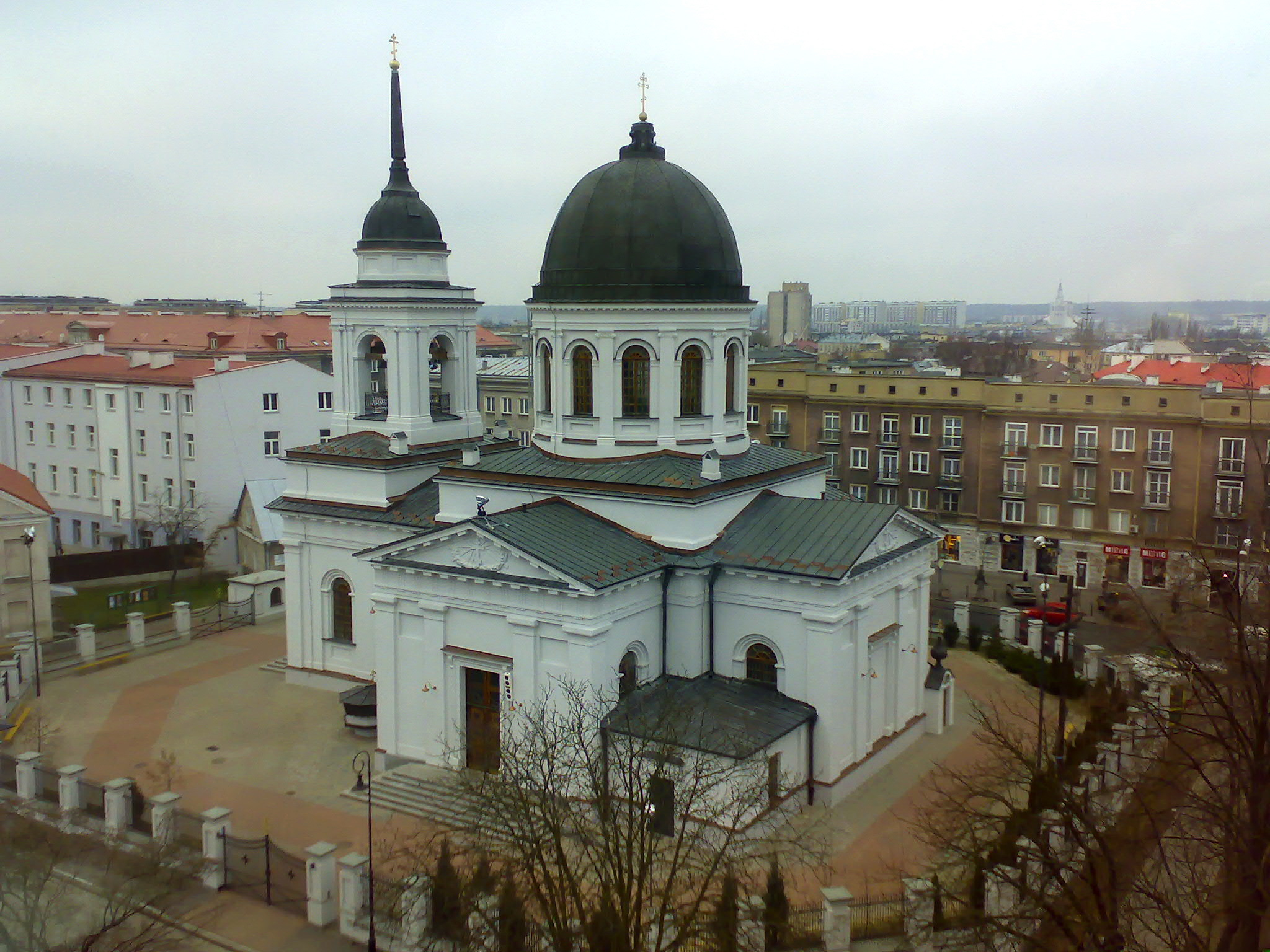
Orthodox Cathedral of St. Nicholas, Białystok, 1843–1846
Monuments and park structures

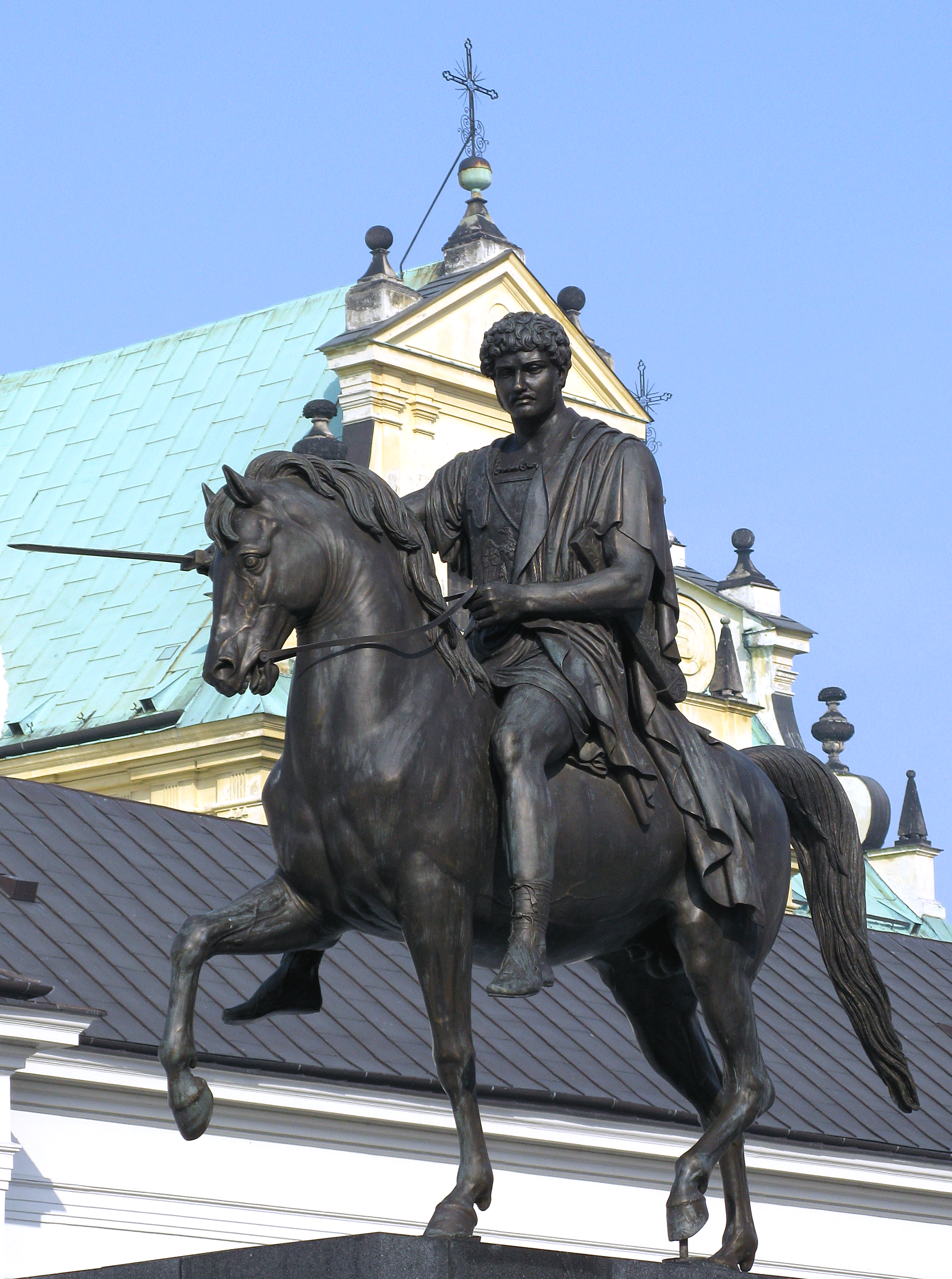
Józef Poniatowski Monument in Warsaw, 1826–1827

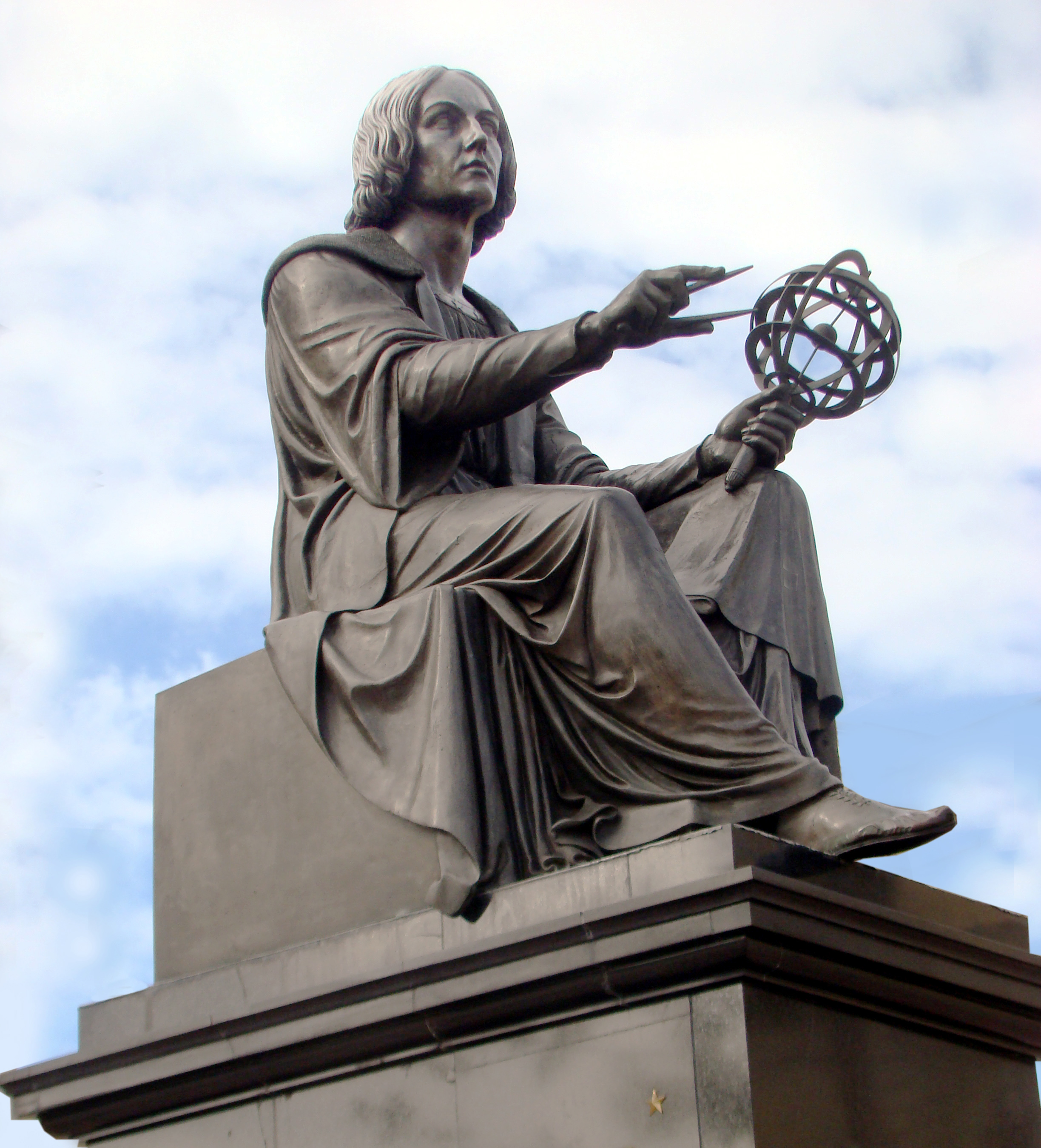
Nicolaus Copernicus Monument in Warsaw, 1828–1830

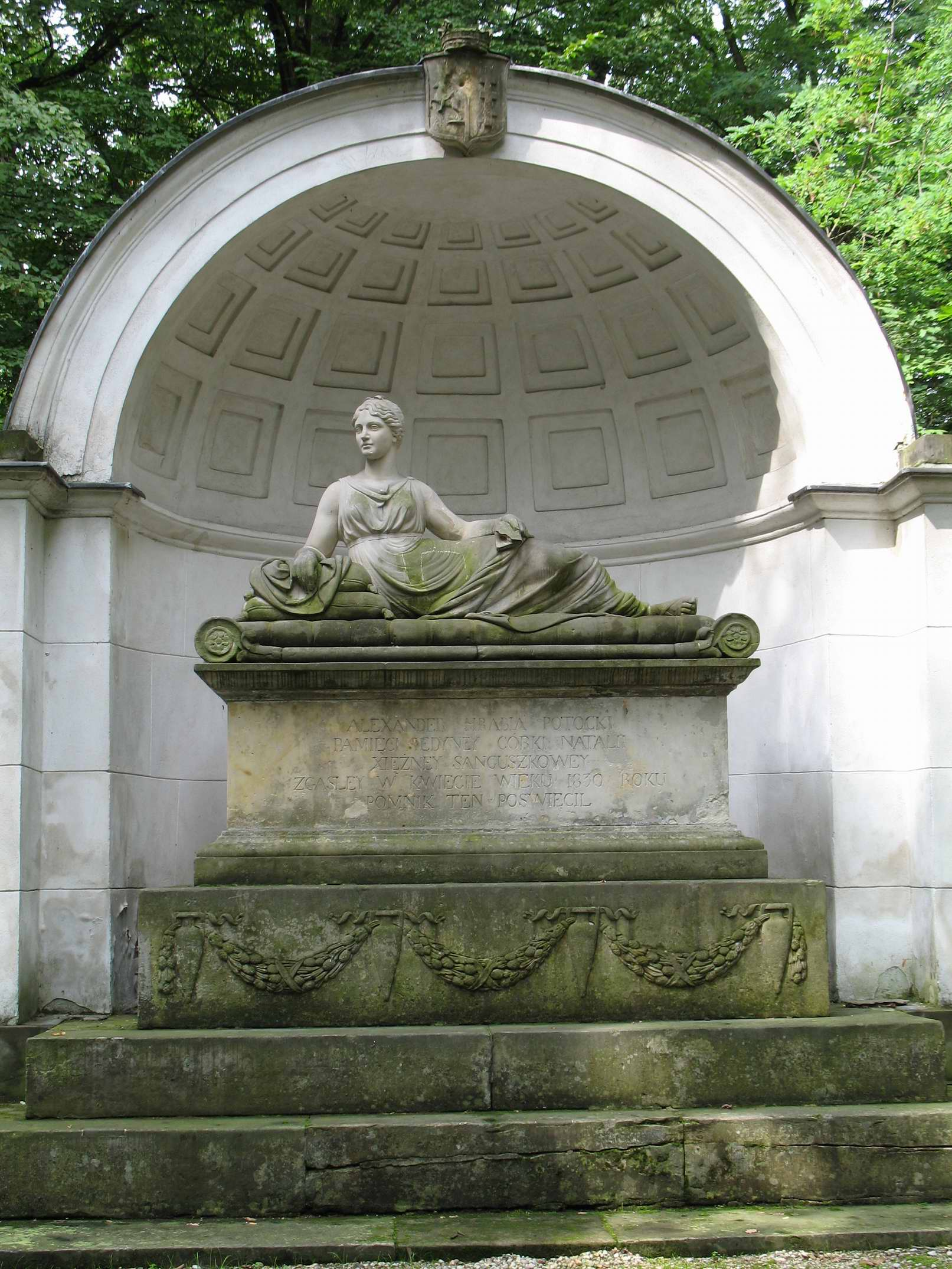
Sarcophagus of Natalia Sanguszkowa in Natolin Park and Palace, 1830

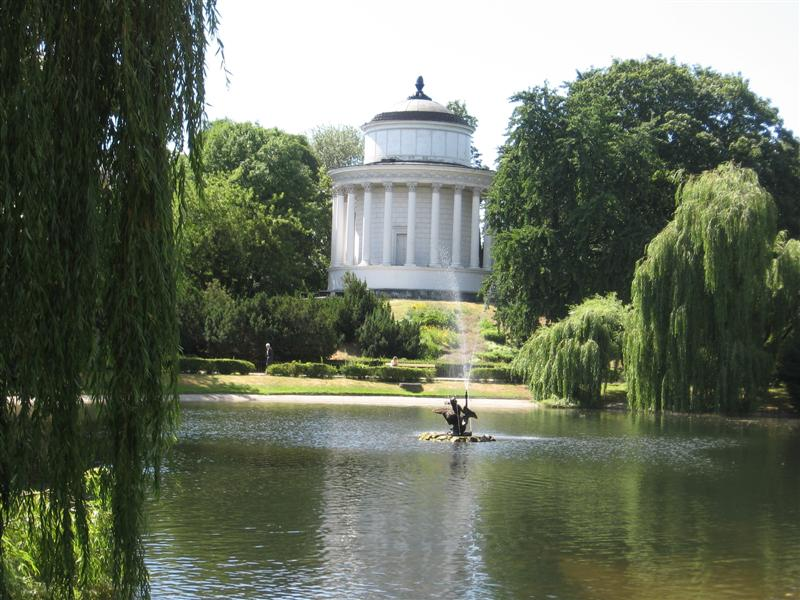
Sybil Temple in the Saxon Garden (Warsaw), 1852–1854
