= Palace of the Four Winds =

Coordinates: 52°14′50″N 21°0′14″E

Palace of the Four Winds Pałac Pod Czterema Wiatrami (in Polish)
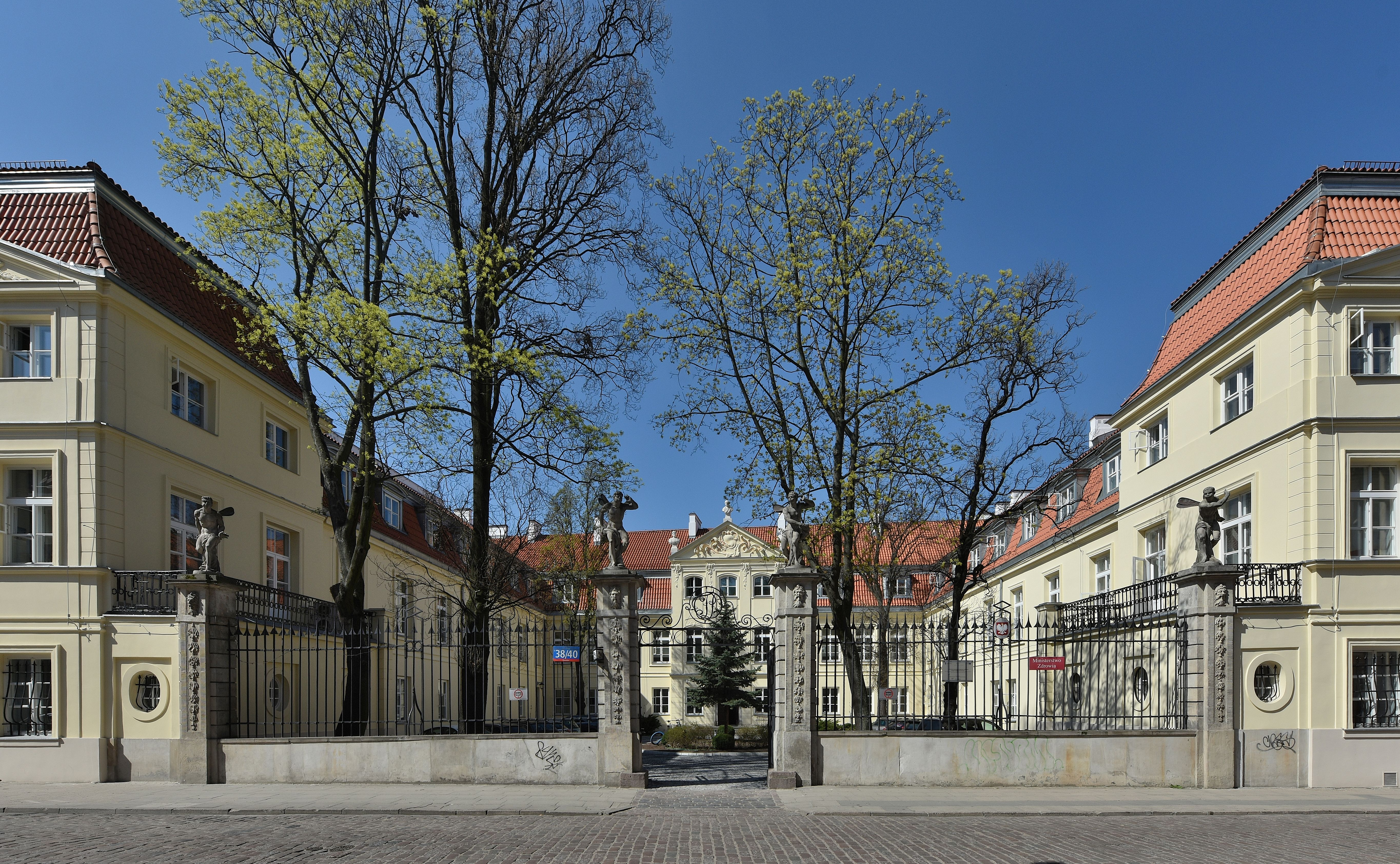
- Interactive map of the Palace of the Four Winds; Pałac Pod Czterema Wiatrami (in Polish) area

General information
- Architectural style: Rococo
- Location: Warsaw, Poland
- Construction started: 1680
- Completed: 1730s
- Demolished: 1944
- Client: Stanisław Kleinpolt, Michał Kazimierz "Rybeńko" Radziwiłł

Design and construction
- Architects: Tylman Gamerski, Johann Sigmund Deybel

The Palace of the Four Winds (Polish: Pałac Pod Czterema Wiatrami), also known as the Tepper Palace, is a rococo palace in Warsaw located at ulica Długa (Long Street) 38/40.

== History ==
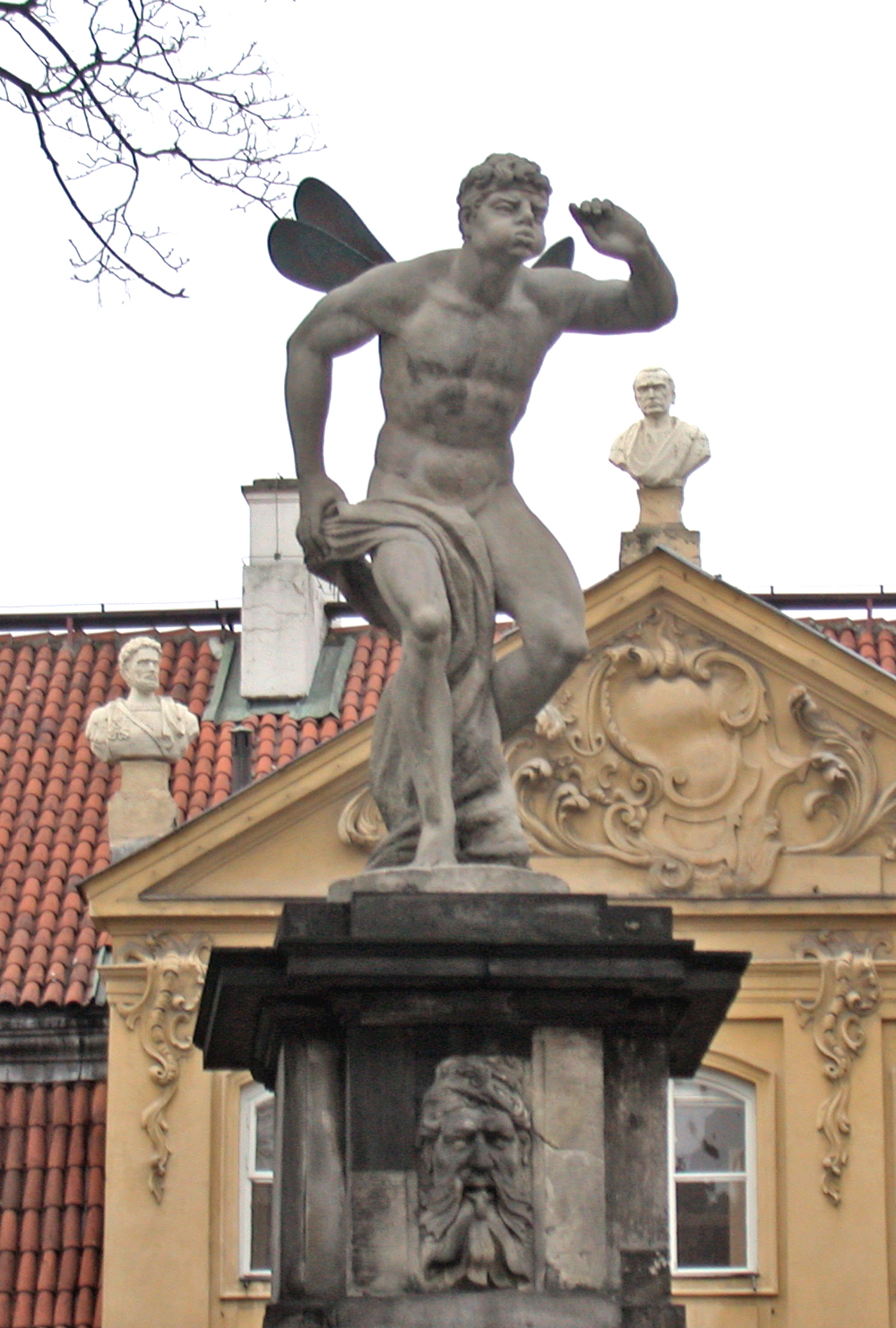
Boreas

The palace was built about 1680, probably to Tylman van Gameren's design, for the high official and royal secretary Stanisław Kleinpolt. The palace was subsequently sold in 1685 to Jan Dobrogost Krasiński, in 1698 to Andrzej Chryzostom Załuski, and in the early 18th century to the Bishop of Płock, Andrzej Stanisław Kostka Załuski.

From the 1730s the proprietor was Franciszek Maksymilian Ossoliński, and later Michał Kazimierz ("Rybeńko") Radziwiłł, who reconstructed the palace in the rococo style, probably to a design by Johann Sigmund Deybel. The magnificent sculptures of the Four Winds (Notus, Boreas, Zephyrus and Eurus) atop the fence posts date from that period. The artist is unknown, but probably also participated in decorating the Saxon Garden.

In 1769–71 the palace was rebuilt by Szymon Bogumił Zug for Piotr Tepper. The right wing was widened, and a new annex was erected adjacent to ulica Długa, with an early-classicist front elevation.

In 1801 the palace was purchased at auction by Karol Fryderyk Dückert. Until 1891 it belonged to his heirs. In 1808–1914 it served as an elegant hotel, the Hôtel de Dresde (Dresden Hotel). After World War I the palace fell into decline, becoming a tenement house.

In 1927 it was purchased by the Polish Treasury, restored, and made the seat of the Ministry of Labor and Social Welfare. In 1944 the palace was deliberately burned by the Germans after they had suppressed the Warsaw Uprising. It was rebuilt between 1949 and 1951 according to a design by Ludwik Borawski.

== See also ==
- Saxon Garden
- Krasiński Palace
- Brühl Palace
