= Holy Trinity Church, Warsaw =

Coordinates: 52°14′19″N 21°00′42″E

Holy Trinity Church
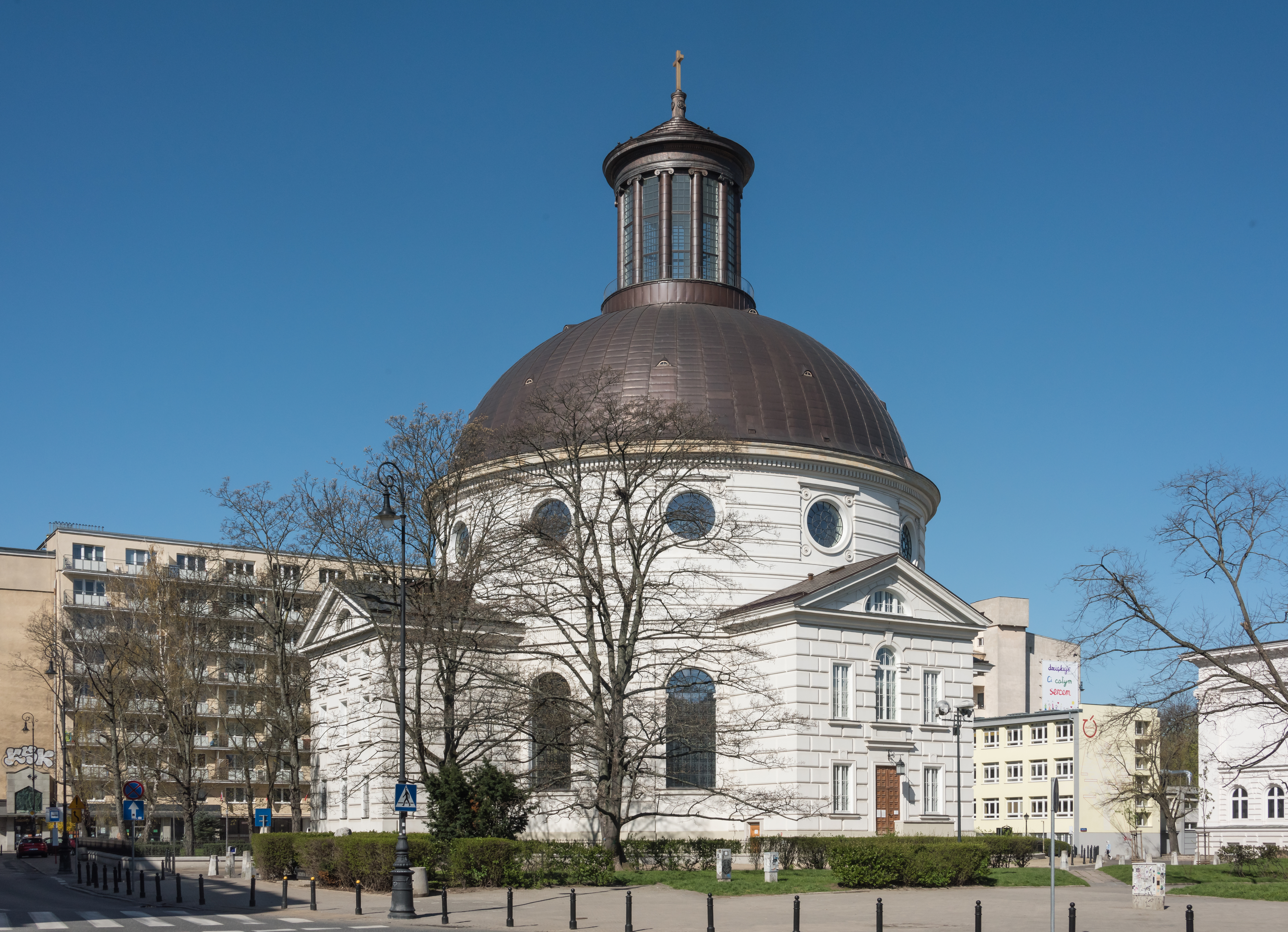
- Holy Trinity Church.
- Interactive map of the Holy Trinity Church area

General information
- Architectural style: Neoclassical
- Location: Warsaw, Poland
- Construction started: 1777
- Completed: 1782
- Demolished: 1939
- Client: Piotr Tepper

Design and construction
- Architect: Szymon Bogumił Zug

The Holy Trinity Church (Polish: Kościół Świętej Trójcy), also known as Zug's Protestant Church (Polish: Zbór Zuga), is a Lutheran church in central Warsaw, Poland, and one of three Augsburg Evangelical temples in the city. Designed by Szymon Bogumił Zug, it is one of the largest churches in Warsaw and one of the most notable for its round design.

== History ==
The king's banker, Piotr Tepper, made efforts to build the church and in 1777 he obtained the appropriate privilege from King Stanisław August Poniatowski. The king however reserved for himself the right of choosing the design of the building. The church was designed by Szymon Bogumił Zug and constructed in 1777–1782. Already on 30 December 1781 the congregation's pastor Gottlieb Ringeltaube celebrated the inauguration of the church.

It is a Classical rotunda based partly on the Roman Pantheon. The Lutheran church was the highest and at the same time one of the biggest buildings of 18th century Warsaw. The diameter of the dome was 33.4 meters and the height was 58 meters. The huge dome with magnificent lantern tower still dominates the nearby buildings. It upholds the spirit of pure classicism. As the tallest building in Warsaw at that time it served as vantage point for the Polish Army during the Kościuszko Uprising.

In the beginning of the 19th century the church was renowned of the music performances accompanying the service. Among the famous musicians, who gave concerts here was Frédéric Chopin. In April 1825 in the presence of tsar Alexander I of Russia, he played on the choralion (aeolimelodicon).

The church fell into ruin when bombed and burnt by the Germans on September 16, 1939. It was rebuilt after the war(1948–53).

Inside, visitors are impressed by its double gallery encircling the interior. Because of its acoustic improvements and a splendid organ, the Warsaw Chamber Opera (Warszawska Opera Kameralna) regularly organizes concerts of classical music here.

== See also ==
- Evangelical-Augsburg Church in Poland
- Jesus Church, Cieszyn
- Palace under the Four Winds

== Images ==
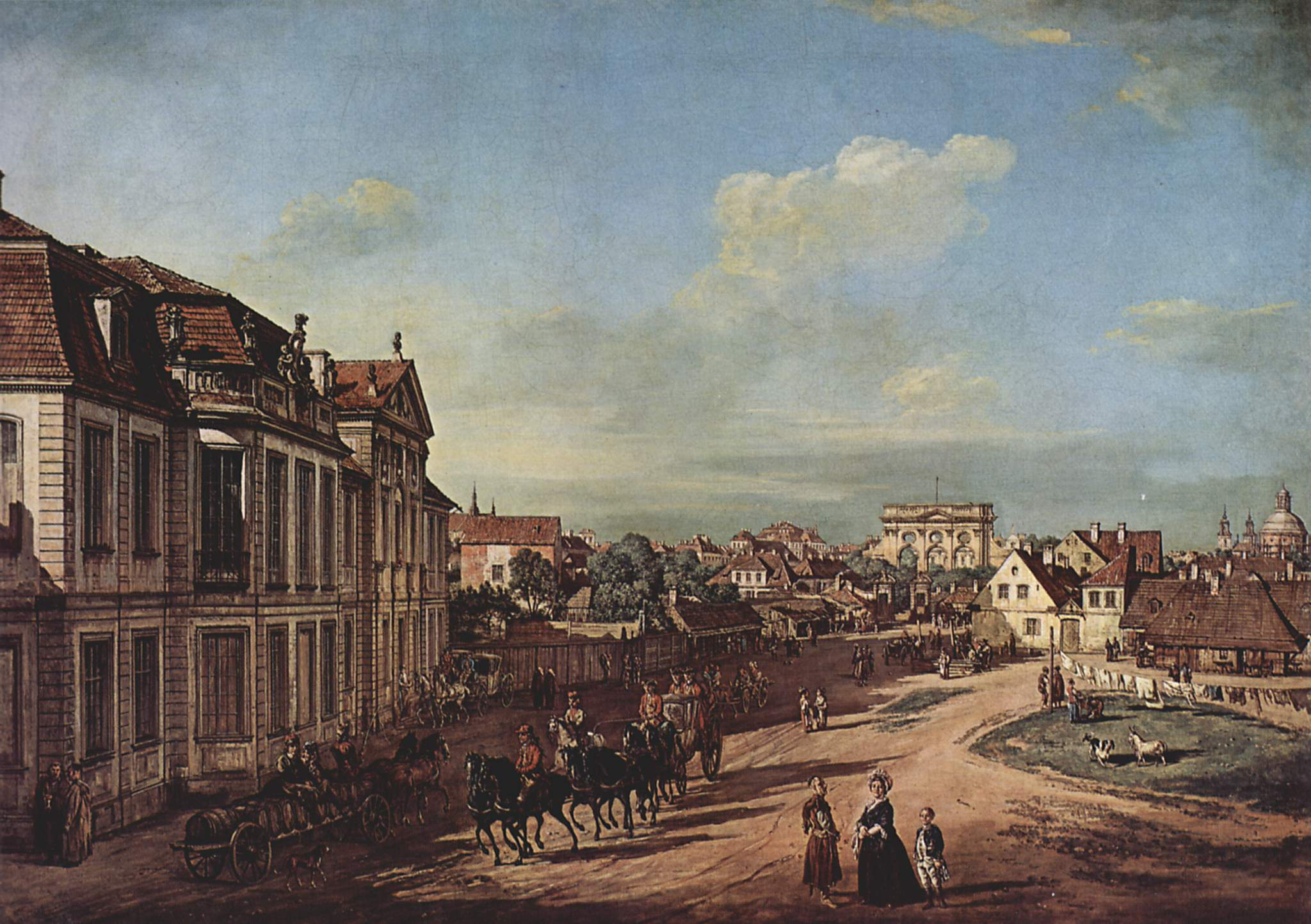
The Iron Gate Square by Bernardo Bellotto with Zug's Church dome seen on the right

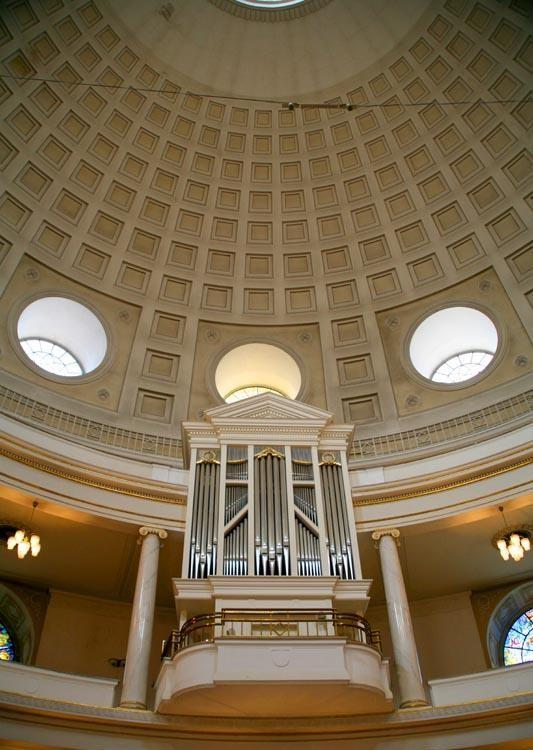
The church interior - organ and dome
