= Fat Kaśka =

Coordinates: 52°14′40″N 21°0′6″E

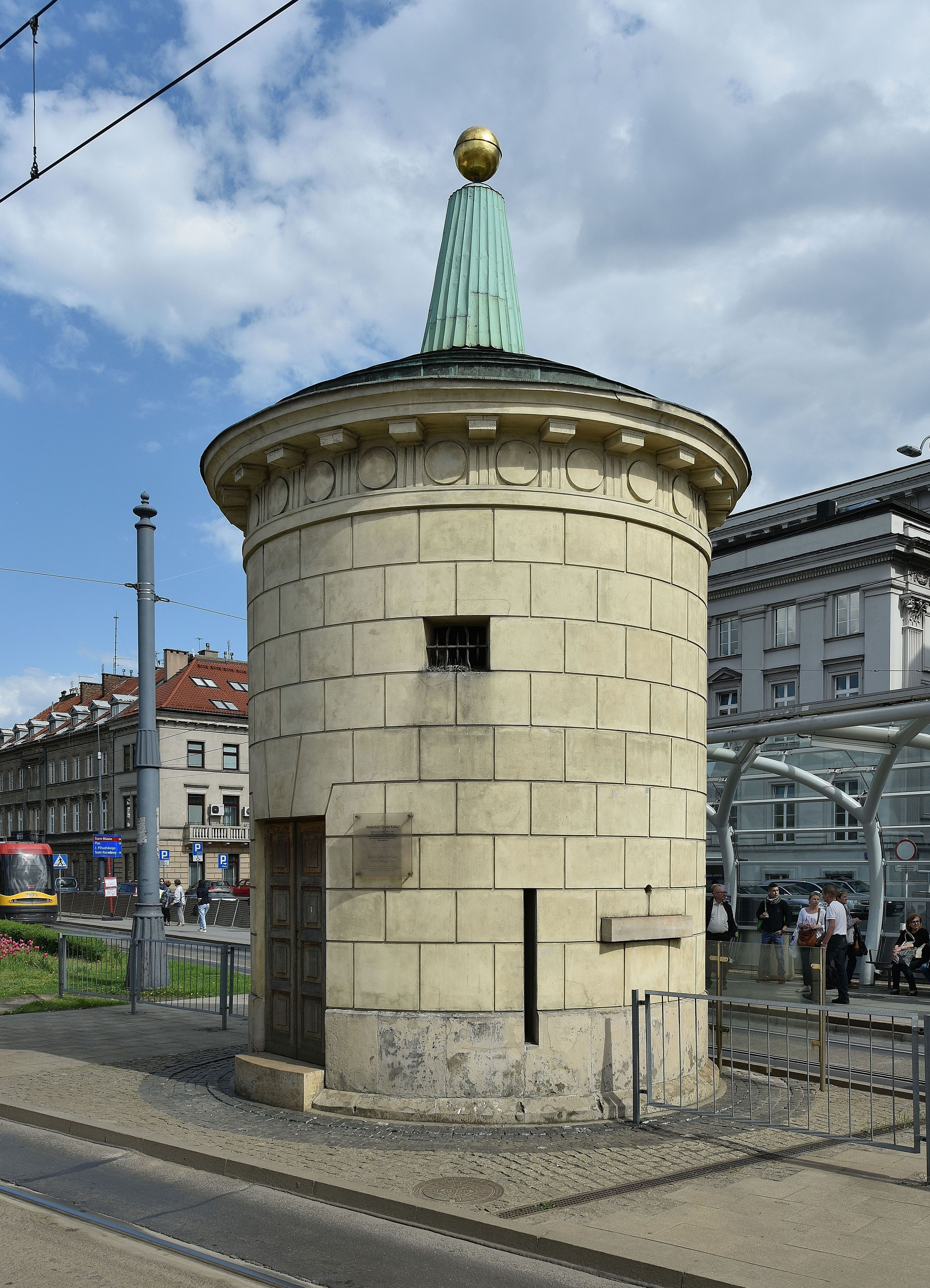
Gruba Kaśka in 2016.

Gruba Kaśka water well in Warsaw Ghetto in 1941.

Fat Kaśka (Polish: Gruba Kaśka; lit. 'Fat Cathy') is the popular name for an 18th-century neoclassical water well in central Warsaw, Poland. It is situated at Solidarity Avenue (Aleja Solidarności), close to the intersection with Andersa Street.

It was built in 1787 and designed by Szymon Bogumił Zug at what was then Tłomackie Square, in the center of the Tłomackie jurydyka. The building has the shape of a cylinder. It is decorated with rusticated panels and has a stepped roof crowned with a gilded ball. The well was one of the few water wells built at that stage in Warsaw.

There was considerable fighting and destruction around it during World War II, notably during the Warsaw Uprising and the destruction of the adjacent Great Synagogue by the Germans in May 1943. Immediately after the war, from 1947 to 1949, the road around it (then Leszno Street) was widened for the construction of the Warsaw W-Z Route. In spite of this, the structure remained almost unchanged.

A renovation in 2004 restored its original appearance, including exposing formerly bricked up windows and strengthening its foundations.

== Bibliography ==
- Encyclopedia of Warsaw. Warsaw: PWN, 1994, pp. 229–230. ISBN 83-01-08836-2.
