= Szymon Bogumił Zug =

Polish architect

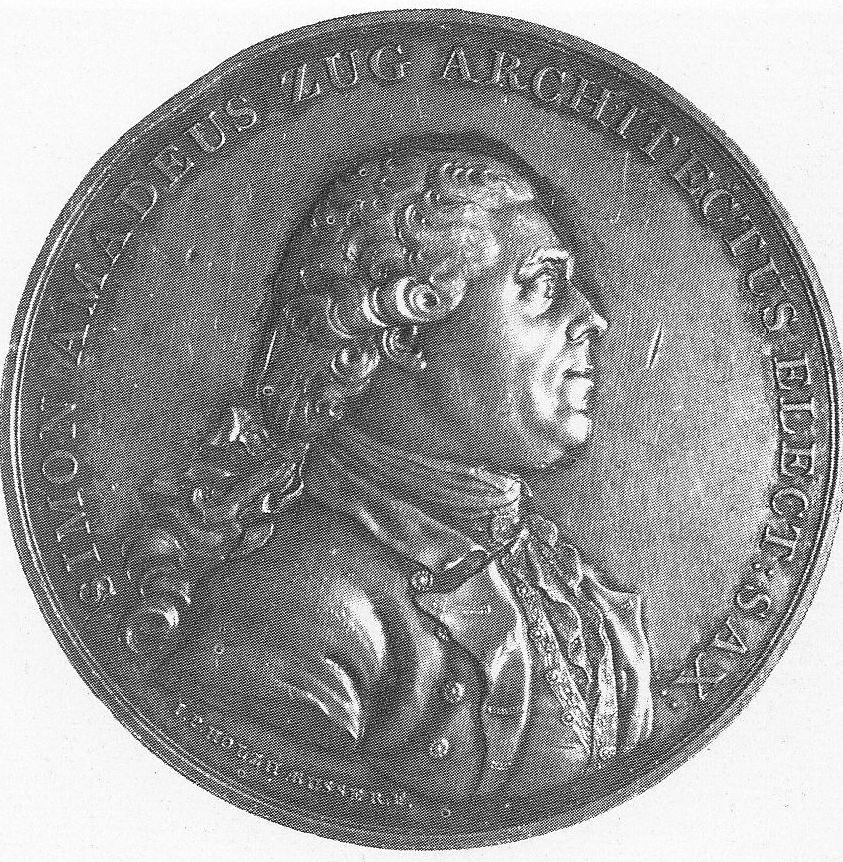
Szymon Bogumił Zug, 1781

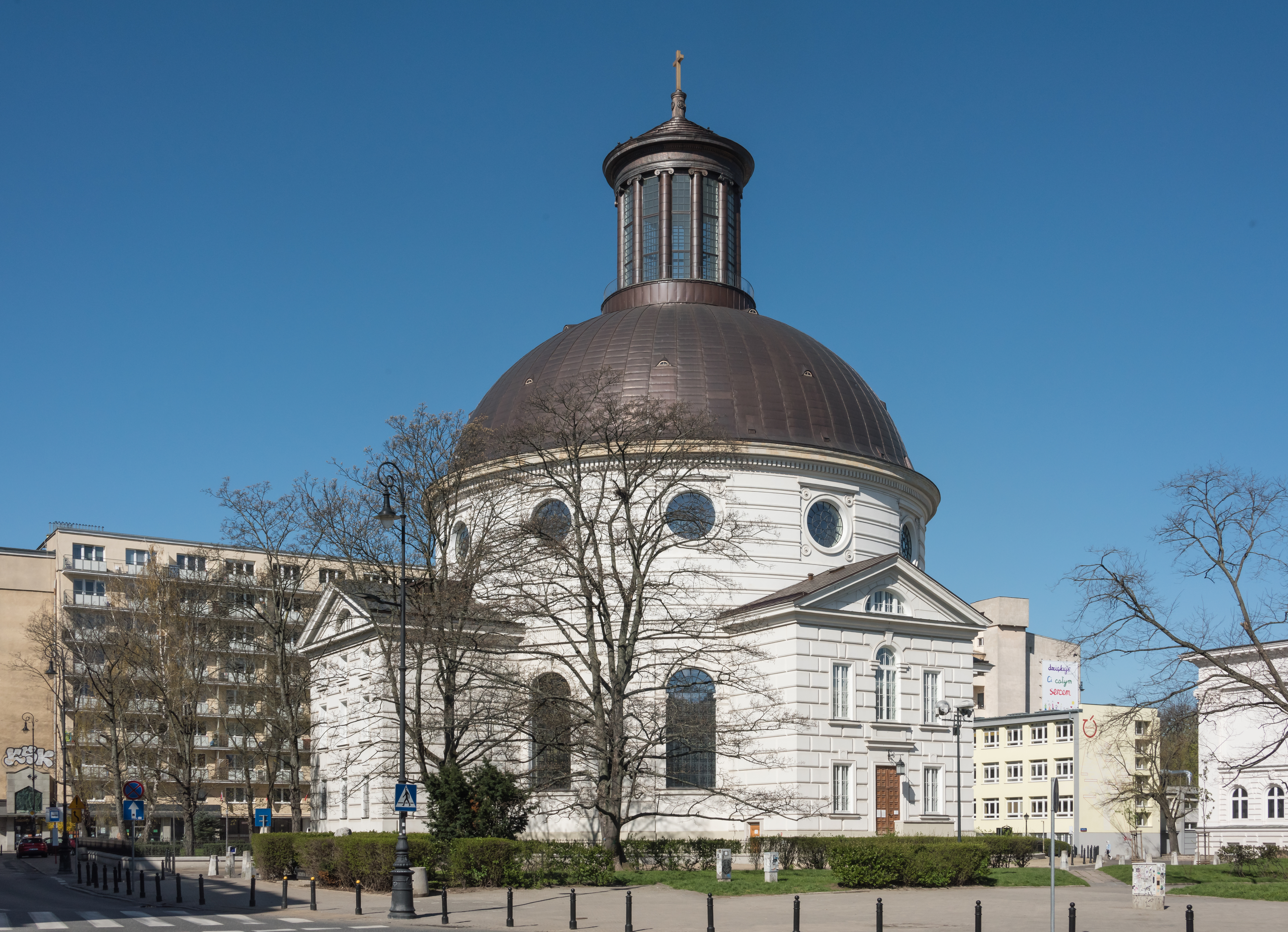
Holy Trinity Church, Warsaw

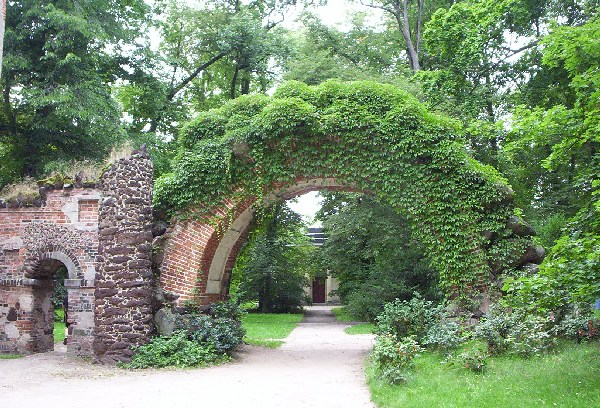
Romanticist stone arch in the garden of Arkadia

Szymon Bogumił Zug (20 February 1733 – 11 August 1807), born Simon Gottlieb Zug, and also known as Zugk, was a renowned Polish-German classicist architect and designer of gardens. Born in Merseburg in Saxony, he spent most of his life in the Polish–Lithuanian Commonwealth, where in 1768, he was ennobled.

One of the most versatile and prolific architects of his epoch, Zug was the author of several dozen projects of palaces and churches. As a garden designer, he represented an early romanticist style. Among the most notable buildings designed by Zug are:

- Lutheran Holy Trinity Church in Warsaw, also known simply as Zug's Church (1777–1782)
- Natolin palace (1780–1782)
- Młociny palace (1786)
- Blank's Palace (Polish: Pałac Blanka; 1762–1764)
- Poniatowski's palace (1772)
- The English-Chinese Garden at Wilanów Palace (1784)
- Fat Kaśka
- The rectory of Evangelical Reformed Parish, Warsaw

Zug also supervised the refurbishment of Warsaw Arsenal, designed the romanticist ruins in the garden of Arkadia near Łowicz and designed the gardens of Jablonna Palace. He died in Warsaw and is buried there in the Evangelical Cemetery of the Augsburg Confession in Warsaw.
