= Palace on the Isle =

Palace on the Isle Pałac Na Wyspie
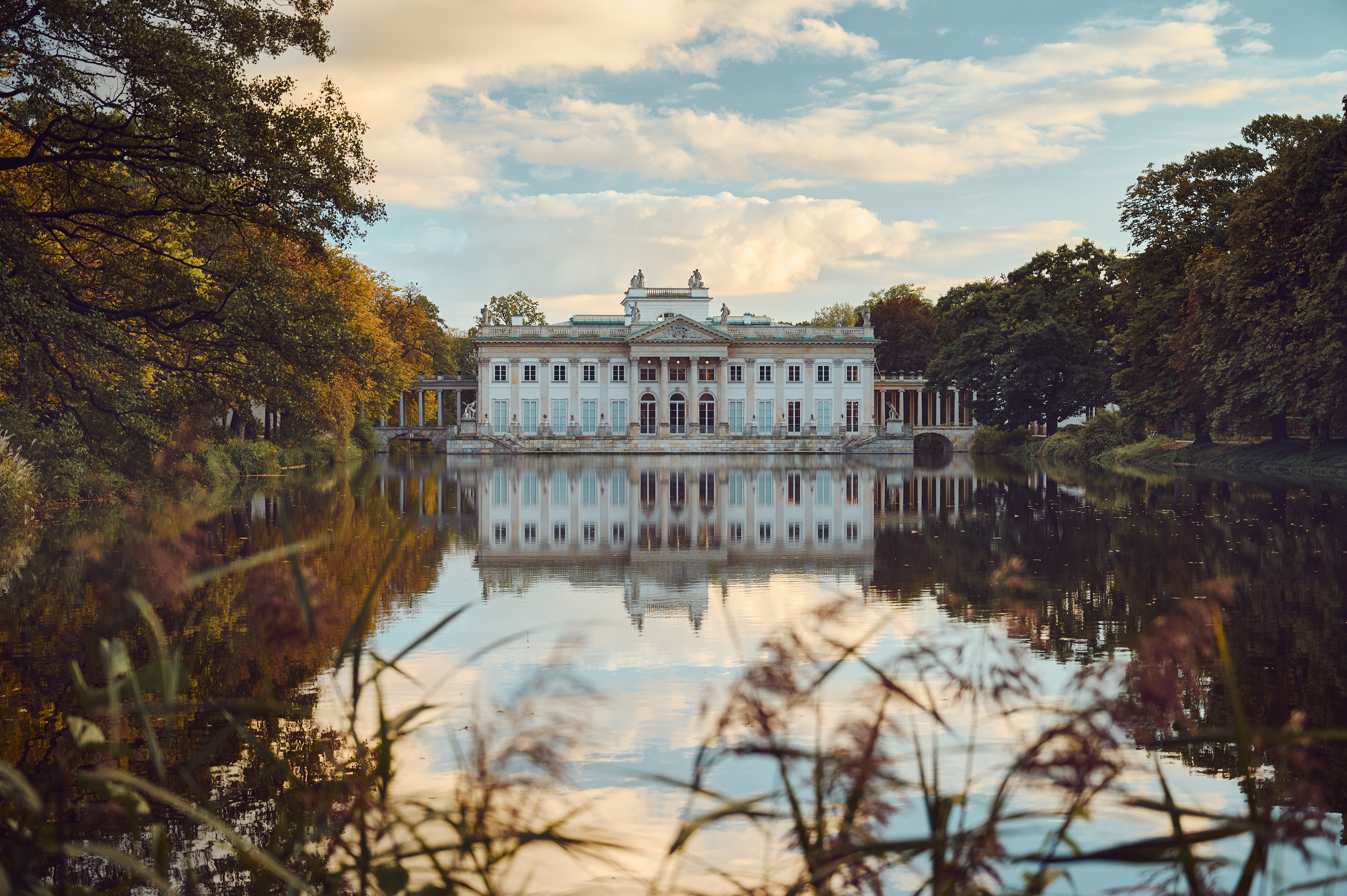
- North façade
- Interactive fullscreen map

General information
- Architectural style: Neoclassical
- Location: Warsaw, Poland
- Coordinates: 52°12′54″N 21°02′09″E
- Construction started: before 1683
- Completed: 1689
- Client: Stanisław Herakliusz Lubomirski, Stanislaus II Augustus

Design and construction
- Architects: Tylman van Gameren, Domenico Merlini (1775–1795)

Historic Monument of Poland
- Designated: 1994-09-08
- Part of: Warsaw – historic city center with the Royal Route and Wilanów
- Reference no.: M.P. 1994 nr 50 poz. 423

The Palace on the Isle (Polish: Pałac Na Wyspie), also known as the Palace on the Water (Polish: Pałac Na Wodzie) or Łazienki Palace (Polish: Pałac Łazienkowski), is a neoclassical palace in the Royal Łazienki Park in Warsaw, Poland. Situated on an artificial island in a lake, it served as the summer residence of King Stanisław August Poniatowski, the last monarch of the Polish–Lithuanian Commonwealth, and is one of the most notable examples of neoclassical architecture in Poland.

The palace originated as a Baroque bathhouse built between 1683 and 1689 for Prince Stanisław Herakliusz Lubomirski to a design by Tylman van Gameren. In 1764, the estate was purchased by Stanisław August, who commissioned its transformation into a royal residence. The palace was enlarged and remodelled in stages, principally by architects Domenico Merlini and Johann Christian Kammsetzer, acquiring its present neoclassical appearance by the 1790s. Its richly decorated interiors housed part of the king's extensive art collection and hosted court gatherings, including the celebrated Thursday Dinners.

During the Second World War, the palace was looted and set on fire by German forces in 1944. Although prepared for demolition, the building was not blown up. It was subsequently reconstructed and reopened to the public in 1960. Today, it forms part of the Royal Łazienki Museum and displays works from the former royal collection.

In 2019 the palace was 11th on the list of most visited palaces and monuments in the world, attracting over 4.9 million visitors.

== History ==
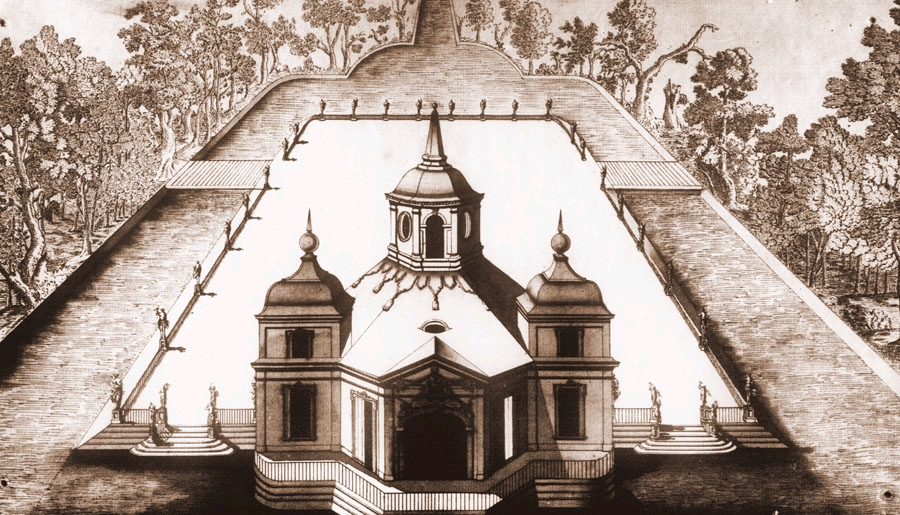
Johann Christian Kammsetzer, Lubomirski's Bathhouse, 1773-1776

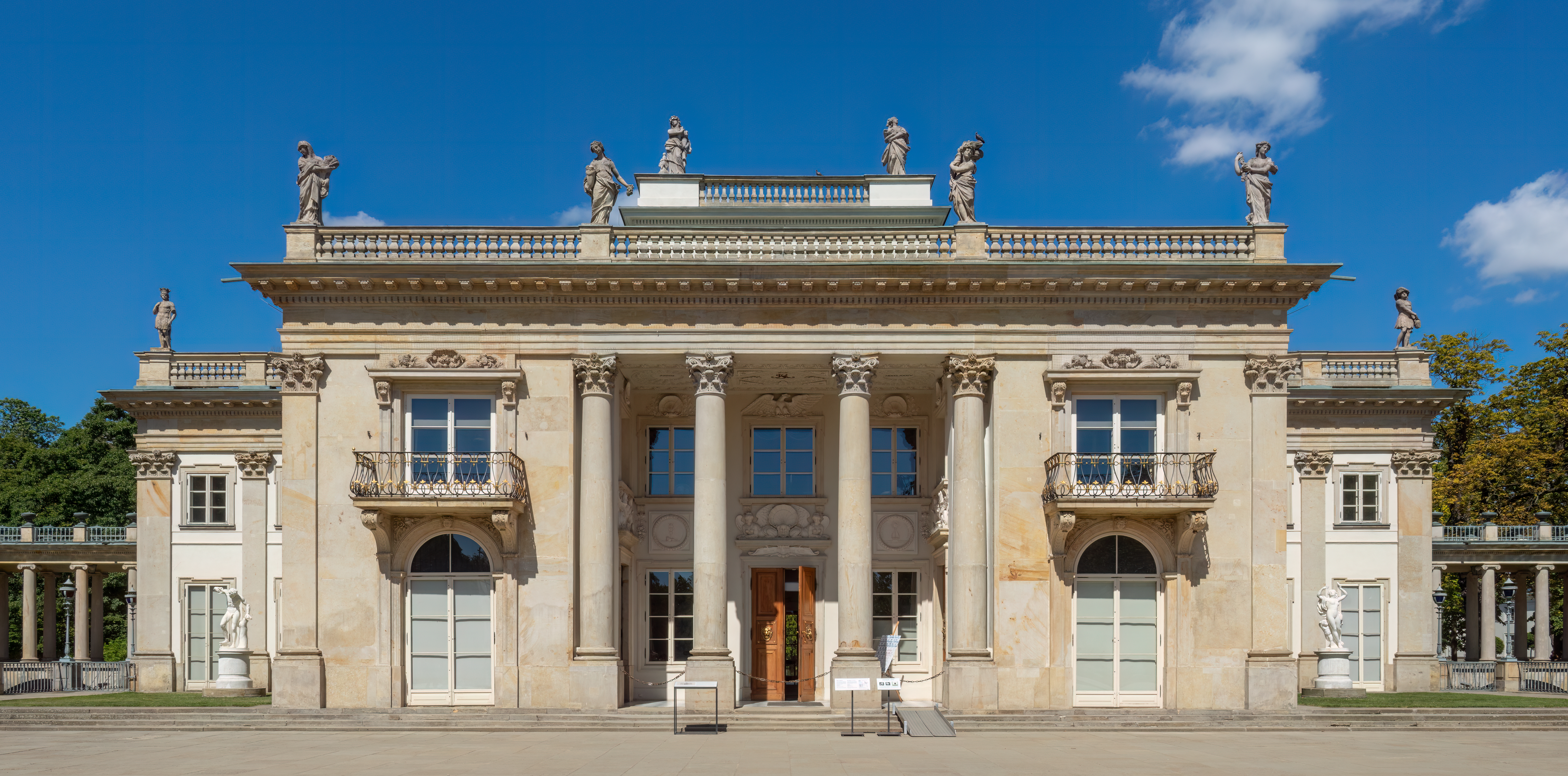
Principal (south) façade

The origins of the palace date back to the late 17th century, when the Ujazdów estate belonged to Stanisław Herakliusz Lubomirski, Grand Marshal of the Crown and one of the leading political and cultural figures of the Polish–Lithuanian Commonwealth. Around 1683, Lubomirski commissioned the Dutch-born architect Tylman van Gameren to design a Baroque bathing pavilion, completed in 1689. The building, known as the Łazienka (Bathhouse), formed part of a larger garden complex that included several other pavilions (Arcadia, Hermitage).

The bathhouse central chamber was designed as a grotto containing a spring associated with the mythological Hippocrene, a source of poetic inspiration. The richly decorated interiors featured stucco ornaments, sculptures, painted ceilings and Dutch ceramic tiles, while the façades were adorned with reliefs, sculptures and Latin inscriptions. Some elements of the original Baroque decoration have survived within the present palace.

In 1764, Stanisław August Poniatowski, the future king of Poland, purchased the Ujazdów estate from the Lubomirski family. He selected the former bathhouse as the centre of his summer residence and commissioned its transformation into a Neoclassical palace, modelled on Italian precedents, such as the Villa Borghese, Villa Albani, Villa Medici, and Villa Ludovisi. The reconstruction, carried out in several stages between the 1770s and 1790s, was principally directed by Domenico Merlini and Johann Christian Kammsetzer.

The first stages of reconstruction adapted and enlarged the original pavilion. The vestibule, the Bacchus Room, and the Bathing Room were retained from the original building. During the first phase of reconstruction, in 1775–1776, an upper storey was added on the southern side. A major rebuilding in 1784 gave the southern façade its present appearance, while further works beginning in 1788 transformed the northern façade and created several of the palace's principal representative interiors, including the Ballroom, Solomon Room, Portrait Room and Picture Gallery. Two additional pavilions were added in 1792–1793.

The sculptural and painted decorations were executed by artists including André Le Brun, Giacomo Monaldi, Jan Bogumił Plersch and Marcello Bacciarelli. The palace also housed a substantial portion of Stanisław August's art collection, which eventually comprised 2,289 paintings. Work on the Rotunda, conceived as a pantheon of distinguished Polish monarchs, continued until 1795, the year of Stanisław August's abdication. The Dining Room was among the venues of the king's Thursday Dinners, gatherings of leading writers, scholars and intellectuals of the Polish Enlightenment. In 1792, Stanisław August formulated a proposal to transform his collections into a public museum, although this plan was never fully realised during his lifetime.

Following Stanisław August's death in 1798, the Łazienki estate passed to his nephew, Prince Józef Poniatowski, and subsequently to Józef's sister, Maria Teresa Tyszkiewicz. In 1817, the estate was sold to Emperor Alexander I of Russia, who was also King of Congress Poland. It remained in the possession of the Russian imperial family until the First World War.

Although the palace retained much of its 18th-century appearance, several alterations were undertaken during this period. In 1846, an Orthodox chapel dedicated to Saint Alexander Nevsky was constructed adjoining the western wing on the orders of Emperor Nicholas I, according to designs by Andrzej Gołoński. The palace also suffered a fire in 1858. During the 19th century, the surrounding Łazienki gardens became a popular recreational destination for the inhabitants of Warsaw.

During the First World War, the withdrawing Russian authorities removed much of the palace's movable furnishings and works of art to Russia. Following Poland's restoration of independence in 1918, the Łazienki estate became the property of the Polish state and was designated for representative purposes. Efforts were undertaken to restore the palace's historical appearance and recover its furnishings. Some of the artworks and objects removed to Russia were returned following the Treaty of Riga in 1921. Further restoration works were carried out in 1921–1922, including alterations to the former Orthodox chapel, which was converted for Roman Catholic use. The palace subsequently served as a venue for official receptions and state ceremonies. In June 1937, it was used during the state visit of King Carol II of Romania and Crown Prince Michael, including a formal ball attended by President Ignacy Mościcki.

Following the German invasion of Poland in September 1939, part of the palace's furnishings and artworks was evacuated to the National Museum in Warsaw for safekeeping. During the occupation, German authorities systematically plundered the residence. By the spring of 1940, almost all valuable movable furnishings from the first floor and a substantial portion of those from the ground floor had been removed. Other objects were taken from their wartime storage locations, while some were subsequently transported to Austria.

In 1944, following the suppression of the Warsaw Uprising, German forces deliberately set fire to the palace and drilled hundreds of holes in its walls in preparation for demolition. Although the planned explosion was never carried out, the fire caused extensive destruction. The first floor and numerous historic interior decorations were severely damaged or destroyed, including the paintings by Marcello Bacciarelli in the Solomon Room, the painted ceilings of the Bacchus Room and Bathing Room, and the wooden floors. The surviving masonry structure and portions of the ground-floor interiors made the building's subsequent reconstruction possible.

Reconstruction began after the war, under the direction of architect Jan Dąbrowski, the palace's pre-war conservator, who headed a specialist workshop within the Warsaw Reconstruction Office. The former Orthodox chapel, converted into a Catholic chapel during the interwar period, was demolished in 1947 to restore the earlier architectural form of the western wing.

The first restored rooms were opened to the public on 16 May 1960, additional interiors, including the Picture Gallery, were reopened in 1962, and the principal restoration works were completed in 1965. The palace became part of the National Museum in Warsaw's Łazienki branch and subsequently of the independent Royal Łazienki Museum.

A further comprehensive conservation programme was undertaken between 2012 and 2015. The works included repairs to the roof, façades, terraces and drainage system, together with the restoration of sculptures, painted decorations, stuccowork, gilding, ceramic tiles, woodwork and other historic interior elements. In 2016, the project received a Sybilla Award for the conservation and protection of cultural heritage.

== Architecture ==
The palace is built on an artificial island that divides the lake into two parts, a smaller northern lake and a larger southern one. The palace is connected to the surrounding park by two Ionic-colonnaded bridges. The façades are unified by an entablature carried by giant Corinthian pilasters that link its two floors and are crowned by a balustrade that bears statues of mythologic figures. The north façade is relieved by a central pedimented portico. On the south front, a deep central recess lies behind a screen of Corinthian columns.

== Interiors ==
The palace's architectural and decorative programme reflected the king's political and cultural ideals. Drawing inspiration from Italian villas, it was intended to represent an enlightened and sovereign state governed by wisdom, justice and reason. The Ballroom featured allegorical and mythological imagery associated with royal virtues, while the Solomon Room contained a cycle of paintings by Bacciarelli depicting episodes from the life of the biblical king Solomon.

On the palace's ground floor is the Bacchus Room, retains seventeenth-century Dutch tiles and an eighteenth-century painting, Flora, Silenus and Zephyr, an altered copy of a composition by Jacob Jordaens. The 1778 ceiling painting, Bacchus, Ceres, Venus and Cupid by Jan Bogumił Plersch, was burned by German forces in 1944. The Rotunda, designed by Domenico Merlini, occupies the central portion of the palace. Decorated in yellow and white marble, with figures of the Polish kings, it is one of the most important examples of neoclassical decoration within the palace. It leads to the Bath Room and the Ballroom.

On the other side of the Rotunda is the lower Picture Gallery, which contains works by Rubens and Rembrandt, and the chapel. Also on the ground floor is the Dining Room in which the famous Thursday Dinners took place, to which King Stanislaus Augustus invited leading Freemasons and other notables of the Polish Enlightenment. Its furniture and paintings are in the Classicist style.

The Solomon Room, one of the largest of the palace's ground-floor interiors, was embellished with a series of paintings depicting the History of Solomon. It comprised six paintings: The Dream of Solomon (plafond), The Queen of Sheba before Solomon, The Judgment of Solomon, Consultation with King Hiram (friezes), Dedication of the Temple and Solomon's Sacrifice (walls). They were executed for Stanislaus Augustus in 1791–93 by Marcello Bacciarelli and depicted the monarch himself as the biblical king. All these paintings were deliberately and completely destroyed by the Germans in 1944 (burned in a fire before the palace) during the preparations to blow up the building. On the first floor are the royal apartments, the upper picture gallery, the balcony room, the king's cabinet, the royal bed chambers, the cloakroom, and the officer's room.

In the years 2012–2015, the palace underwent further renovations, which covered the roof as well as all the rooms of the palace including the Ball Room in which 17th-century wall paintings by Jan Bogumił Plersch were unveiled. In 2016, the palace and park received an estimated 2.1 million visitors.

== Gallery ==
Palace on the Isle

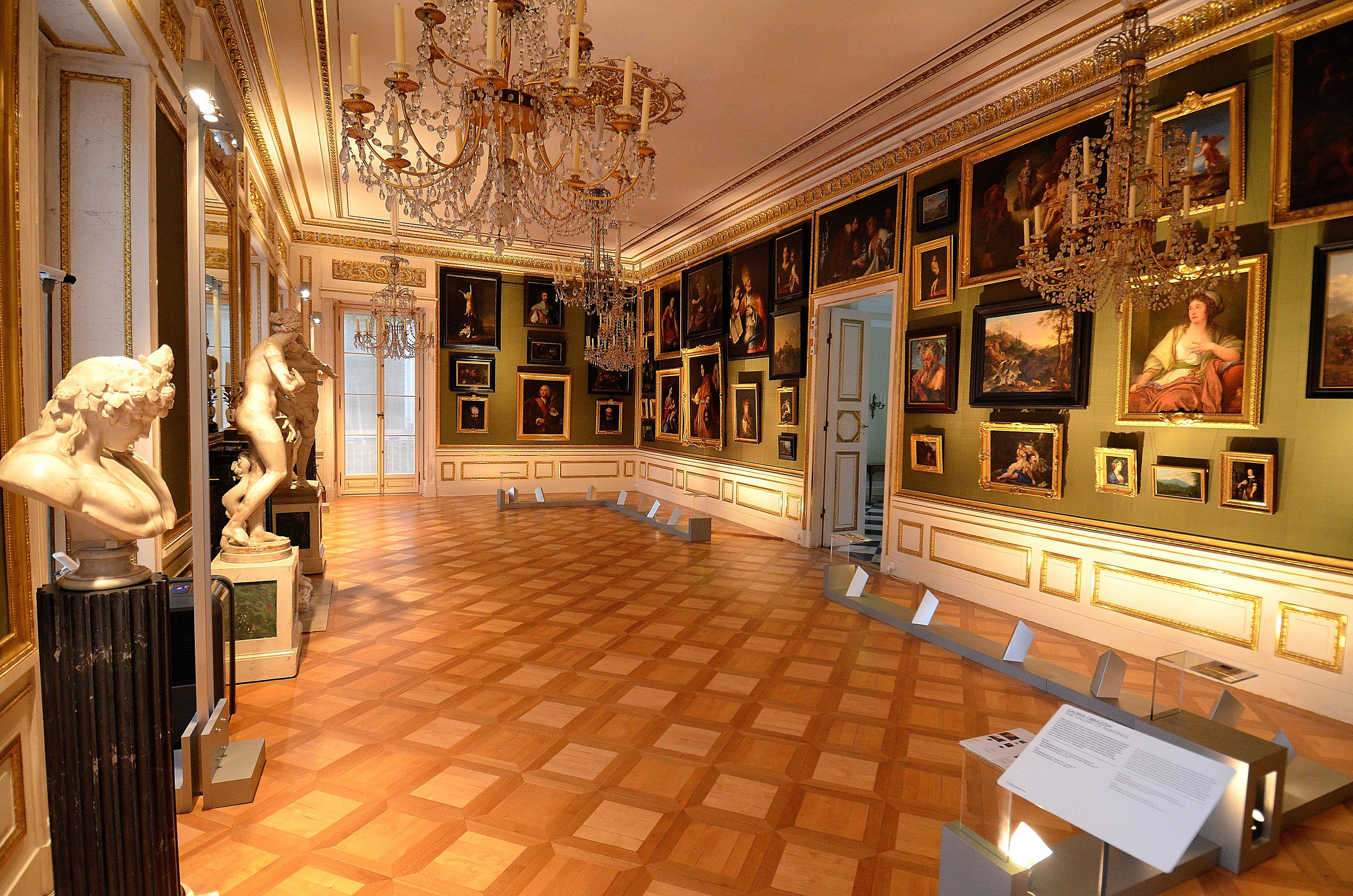
Paintings gallery

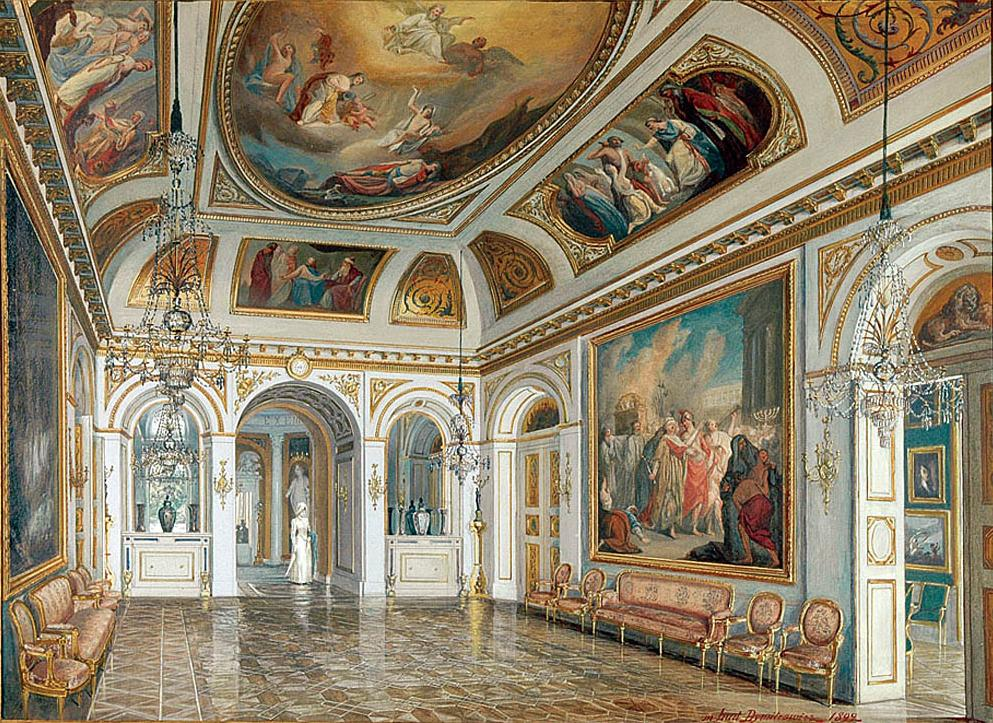
Solomon Room (1892), by Ludomir Dymitrowicz (1844-1923)

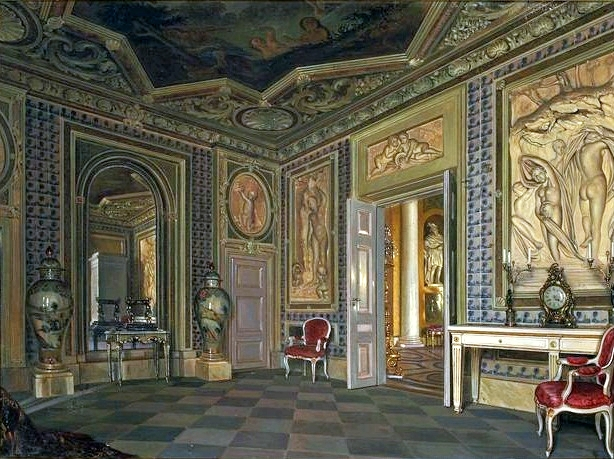
Bathing Room (1875), by Aleksander Gryglewski

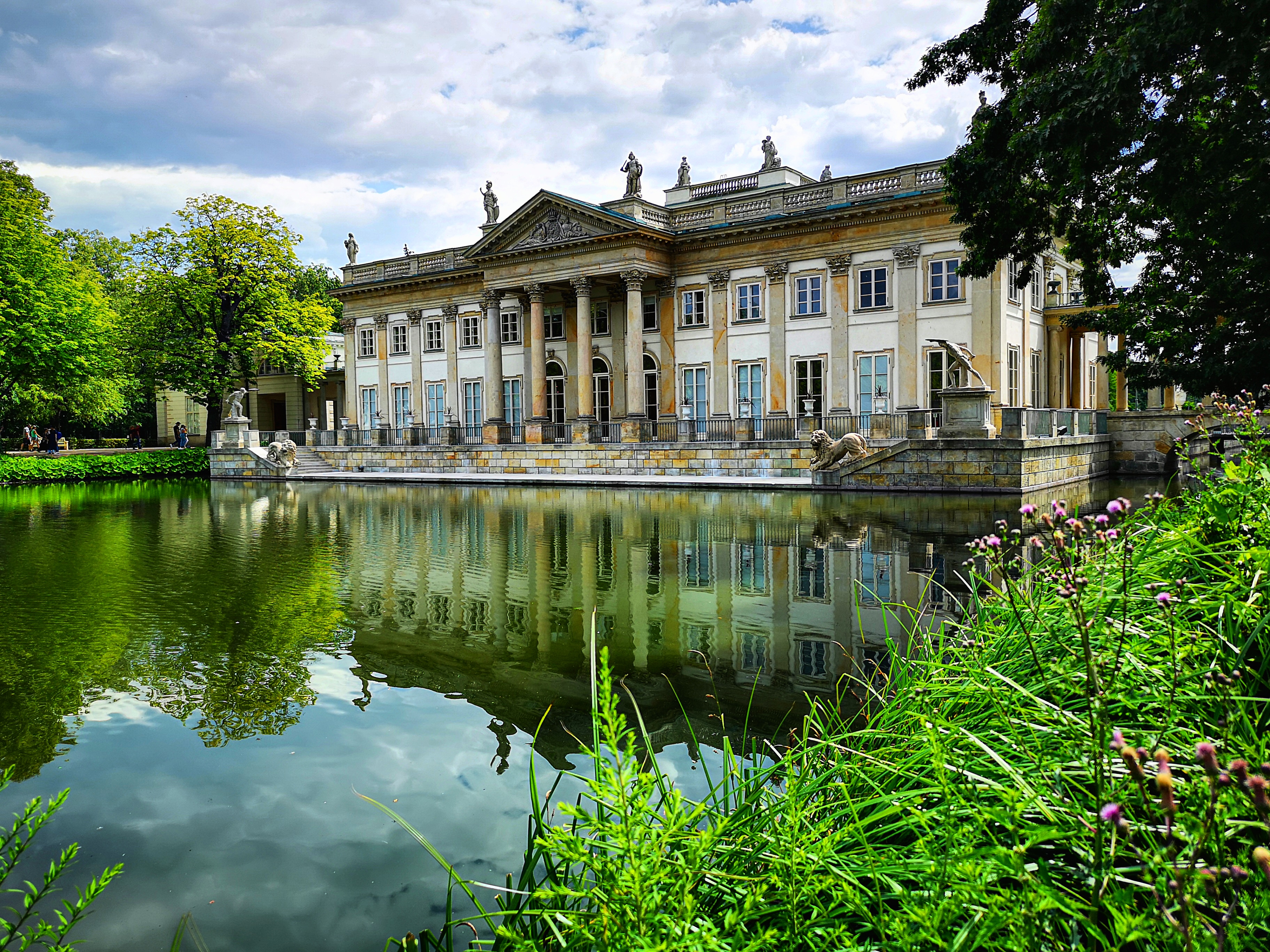
The northern façade of the palace

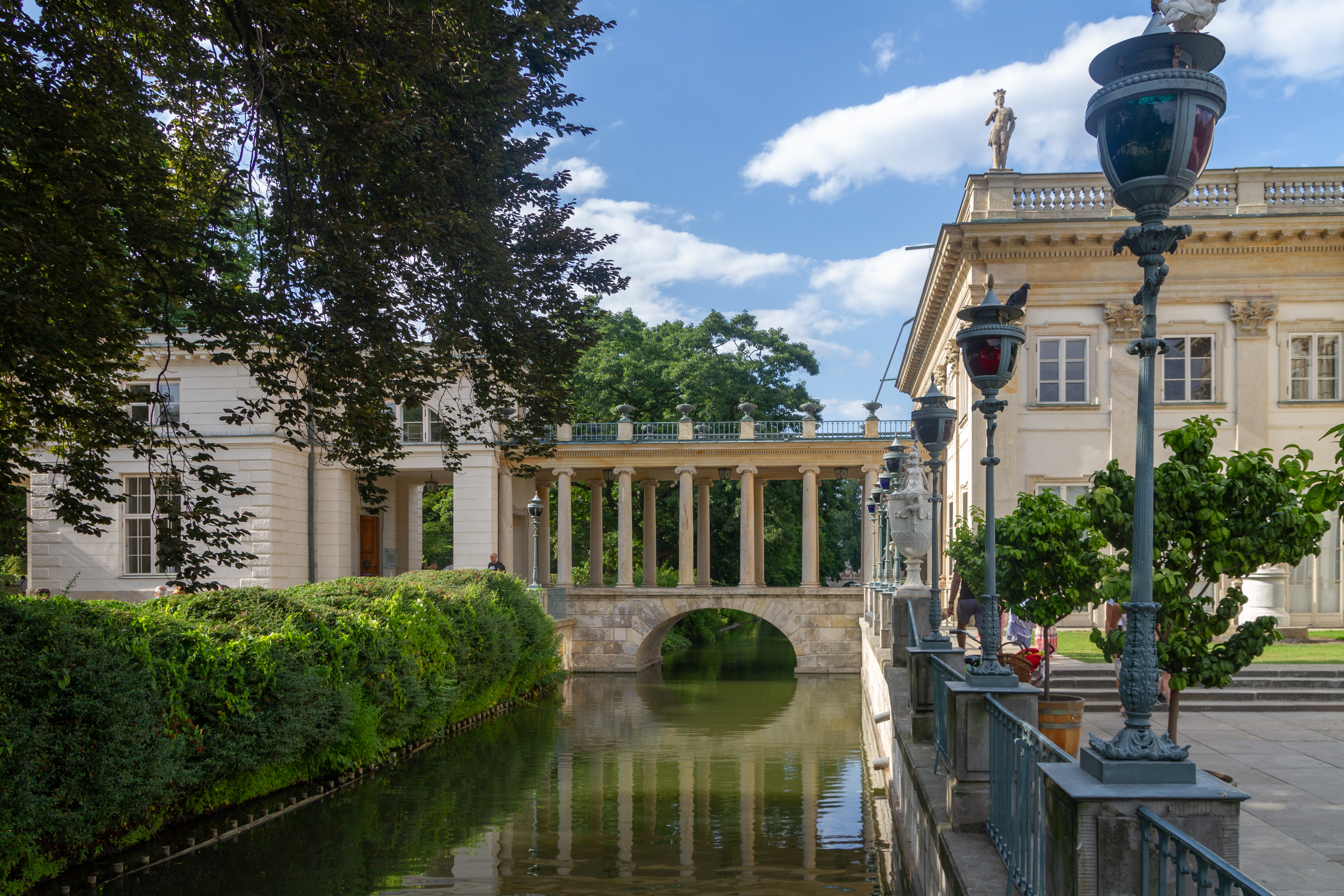
One of two bridges leading to the palace

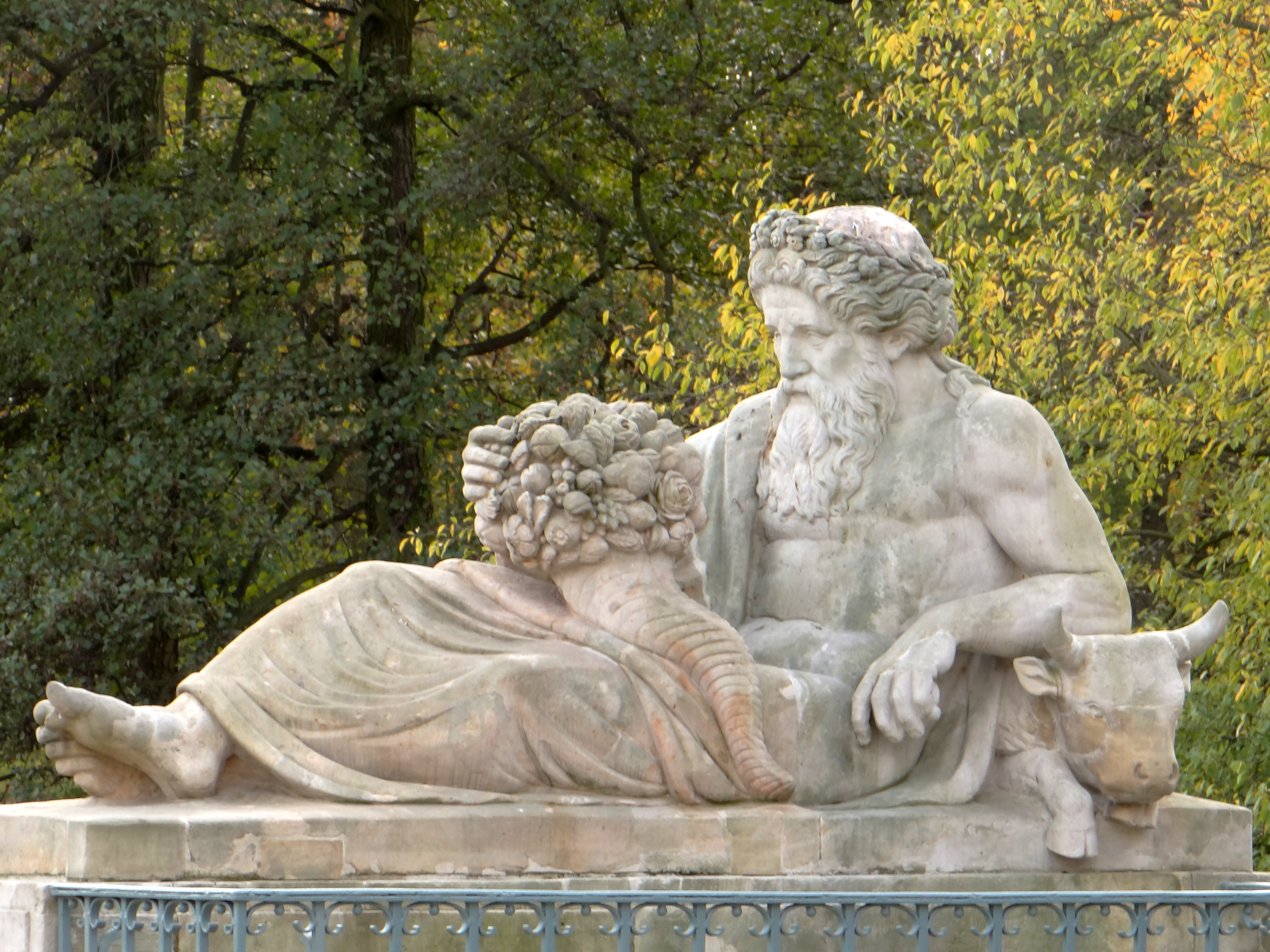
Statue depicting allegory of the Bug River

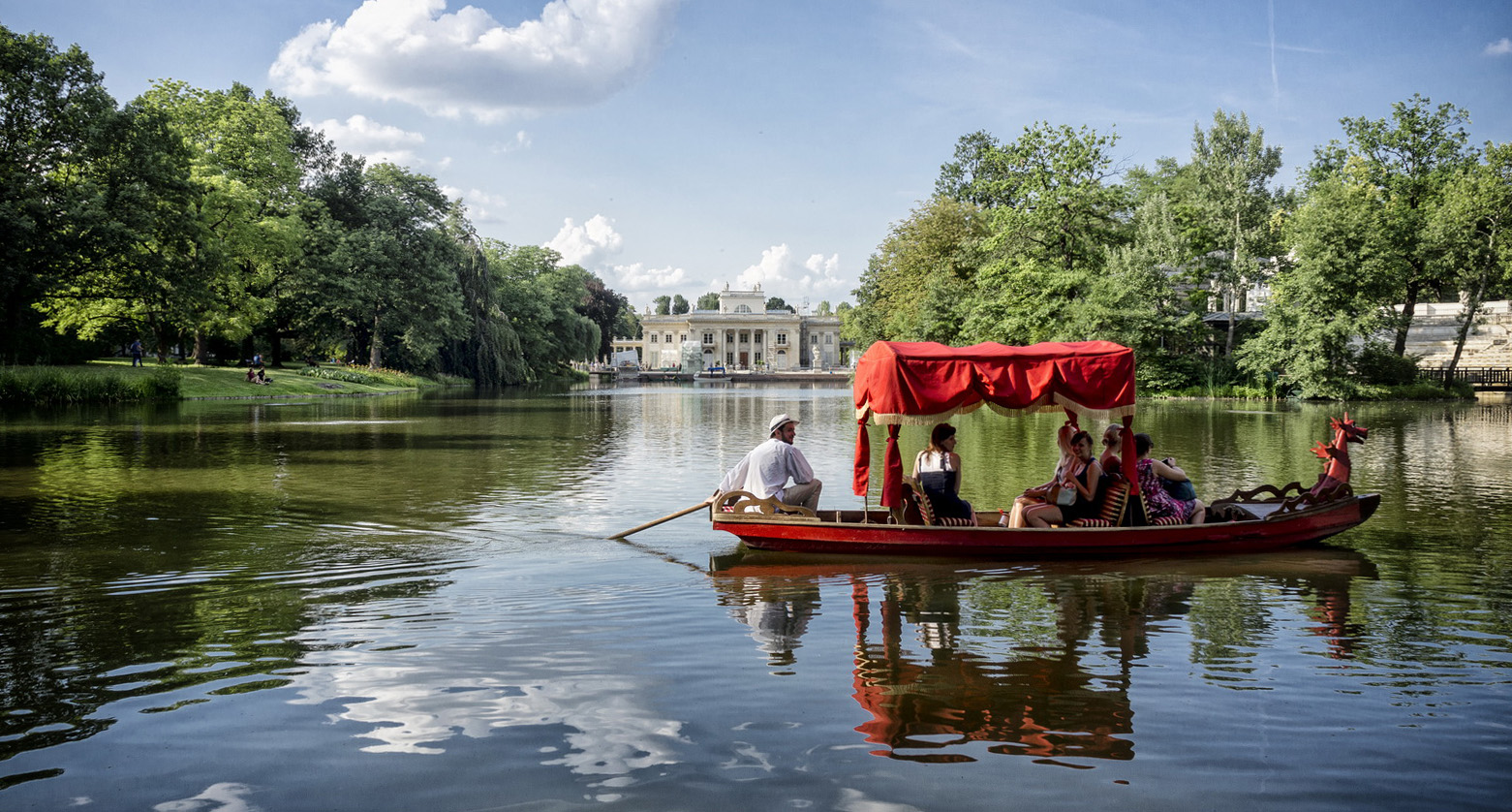
Lake surrounding the palace

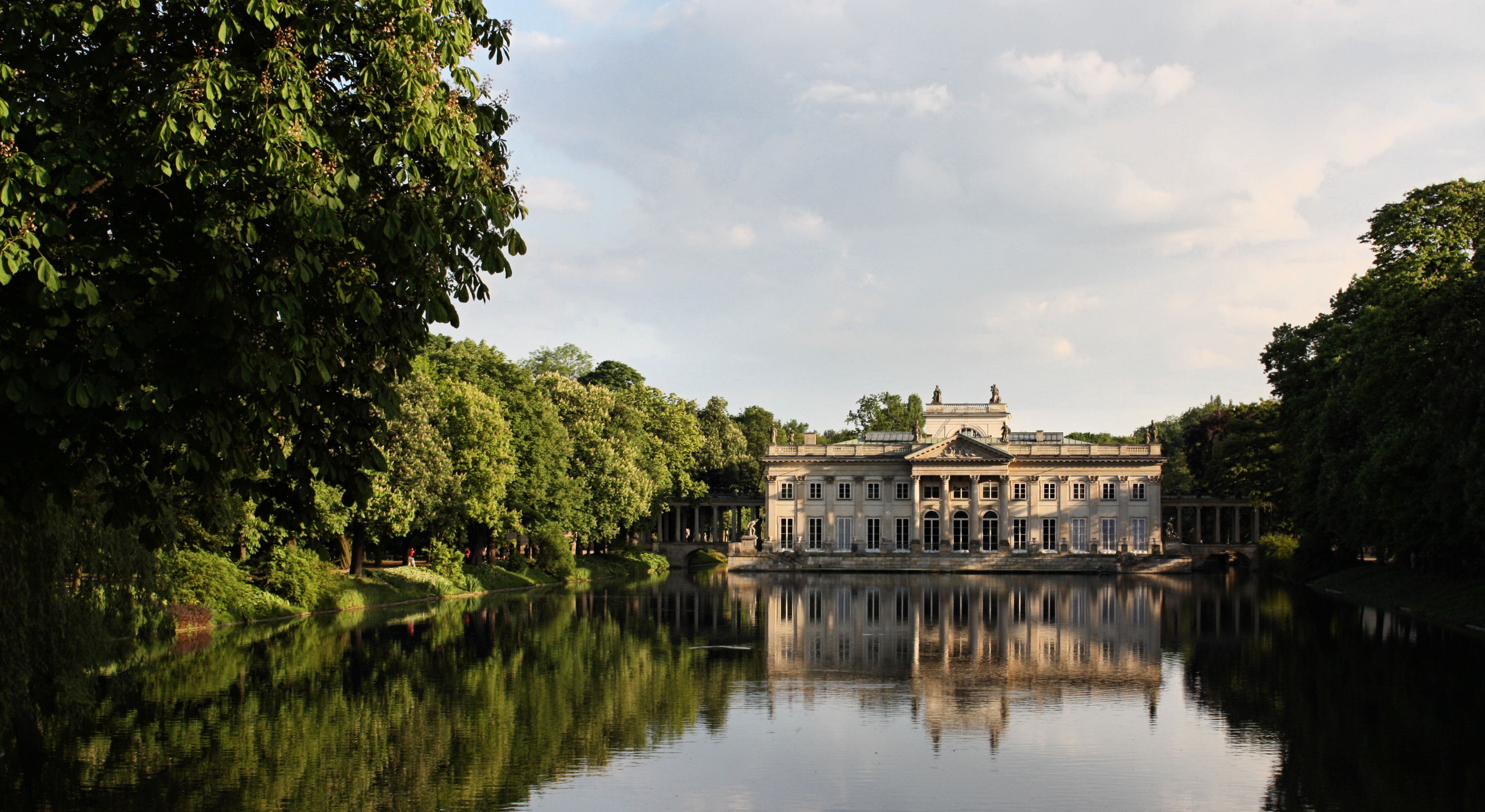
The palace and park

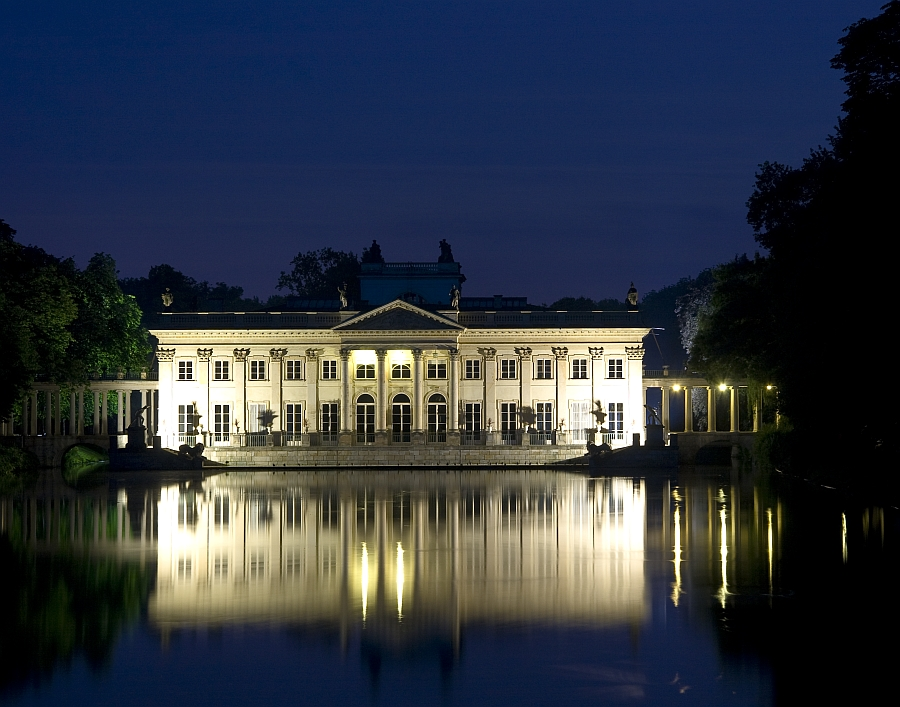
Palace on the Isle at night
Artwork

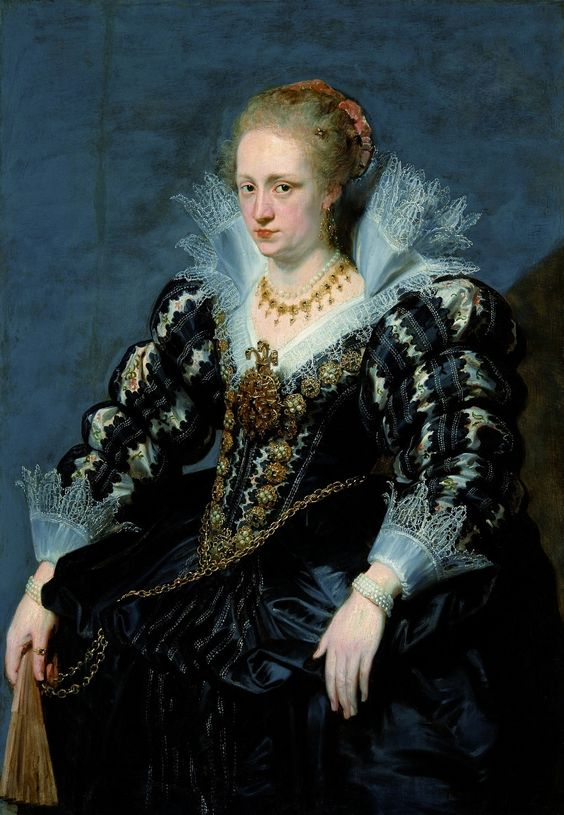
Portrait of Jacqueline de Caestre, Anthony van Dyck, ca. 1618

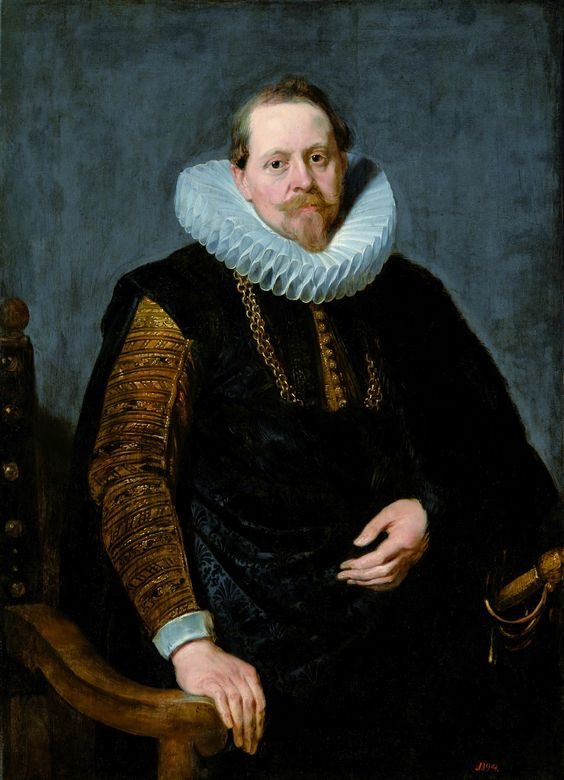
Portrait of Jean Charles de Cordes, Anthony van Dyck, ca. 1618-22

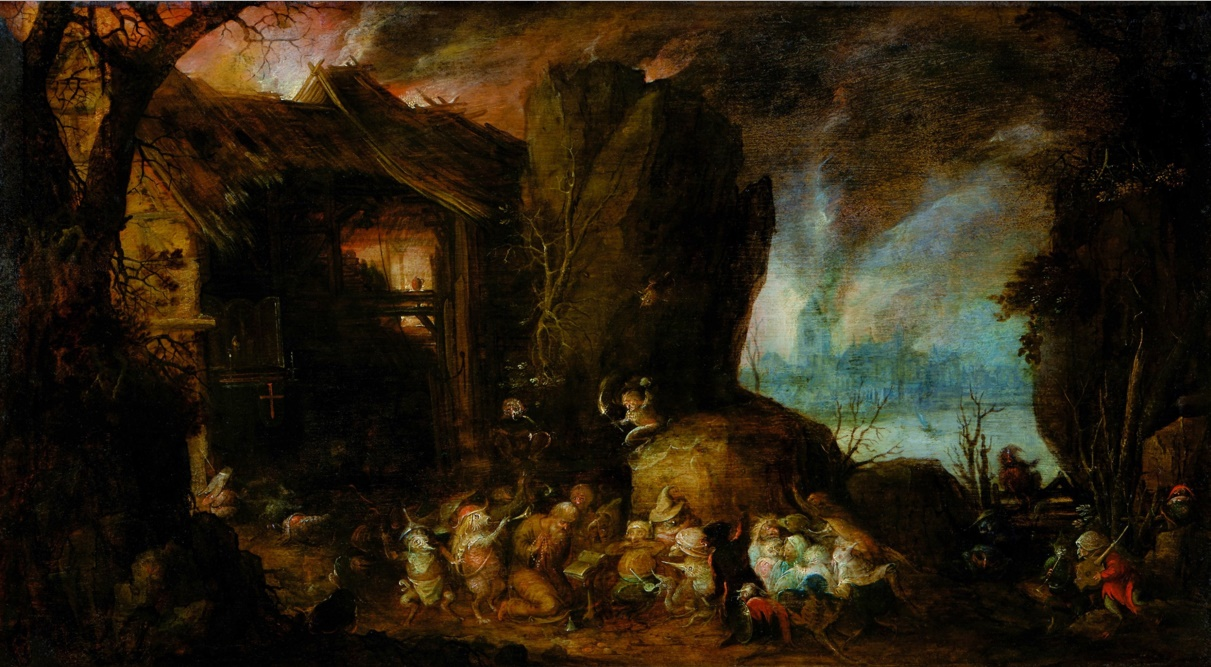
Temptation of St. Anthony, Jan Brueghel the Younger, 17th century

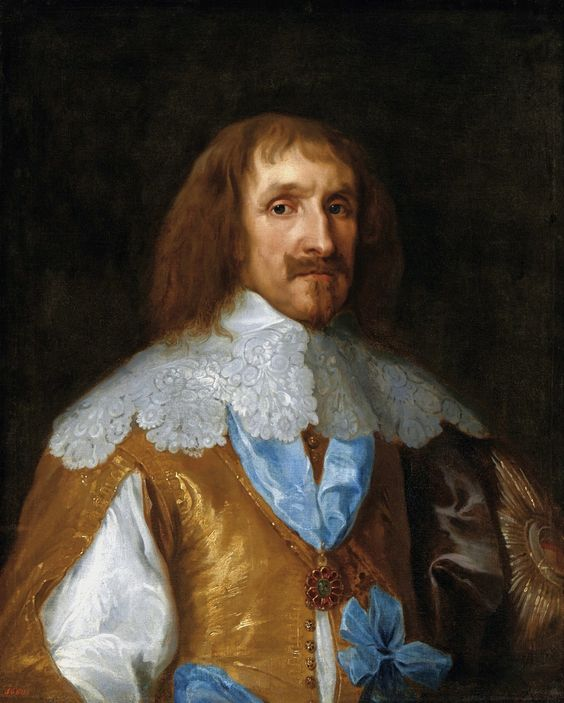
Portrait of Philip Herbert, 4th Earl of Pembroke, Anthony van Dyck, ca, 1634

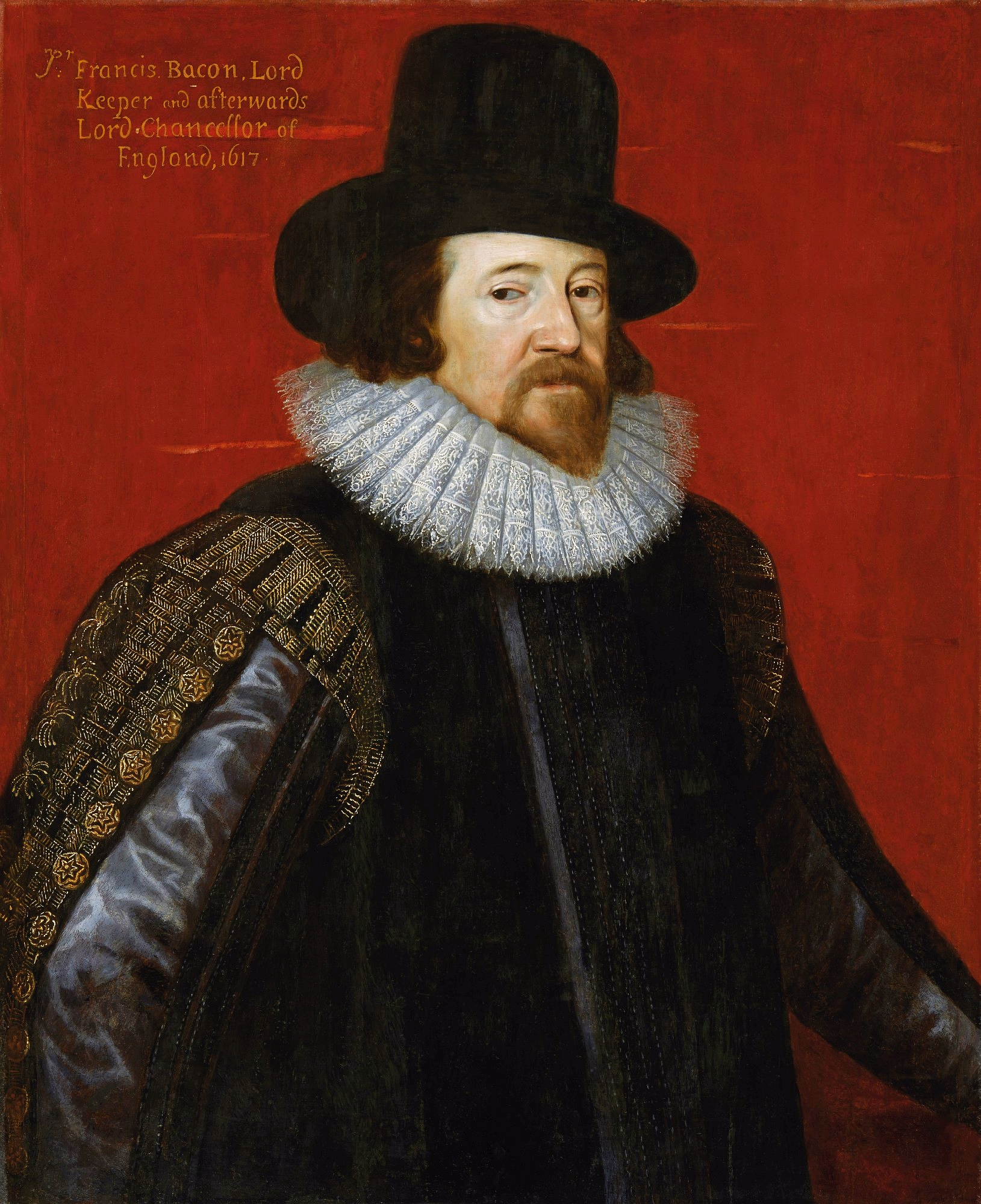
Portrait of Francis Bacon, Frans Pourbus the Younger, 1617

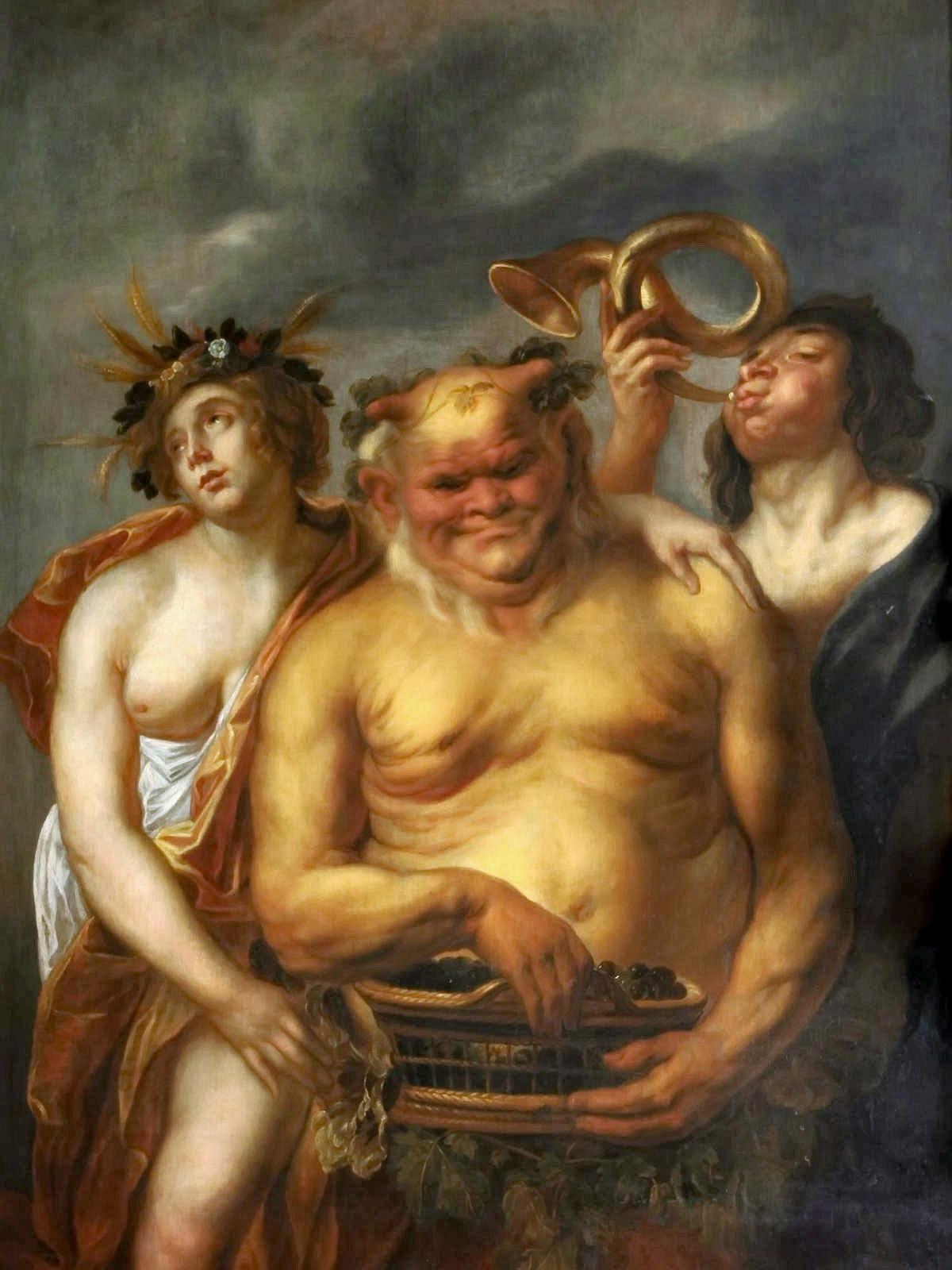
Silenus and Bacchantes, after Jacob Jordaens, first half of 17th century

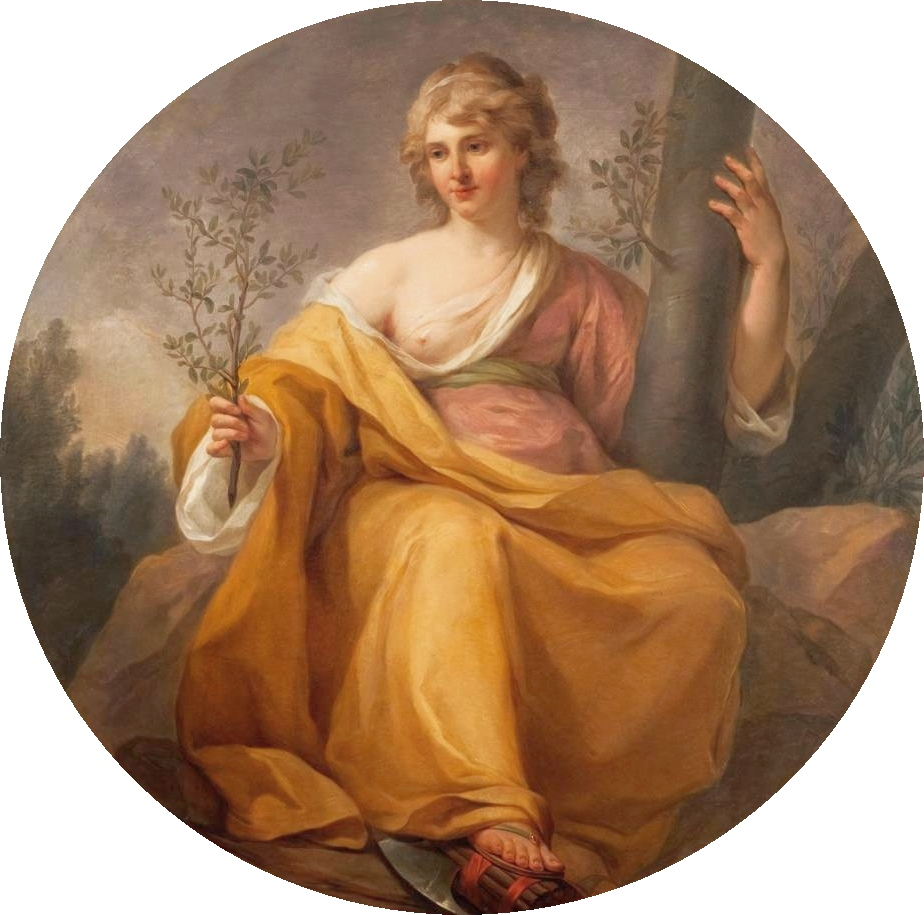
Allegory of Graciousness, Marcello Bacciarelli, ca. 1792

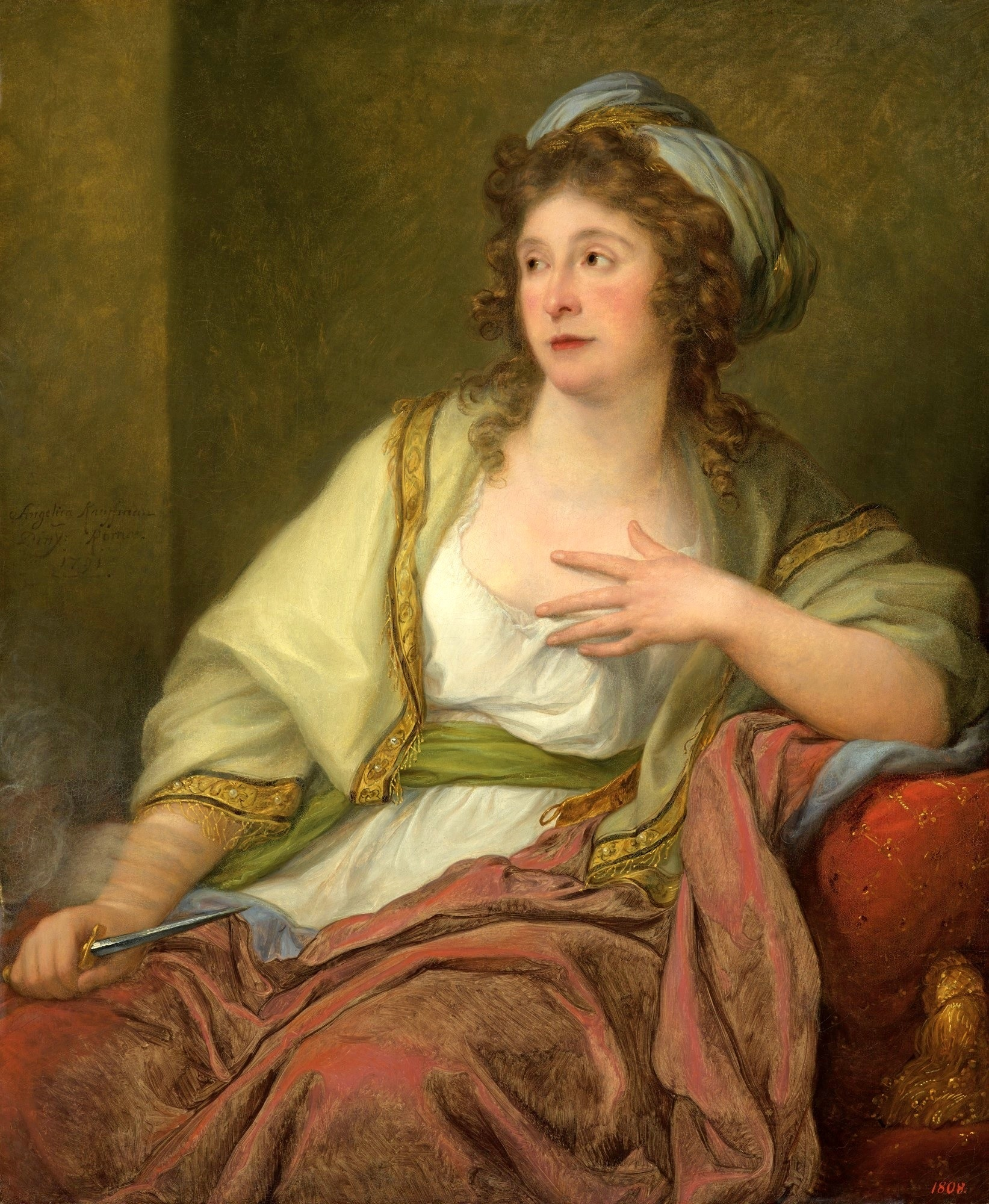
Princess Giuliana Pubblicola Santacroce, Angelica Kauffmann, 1791

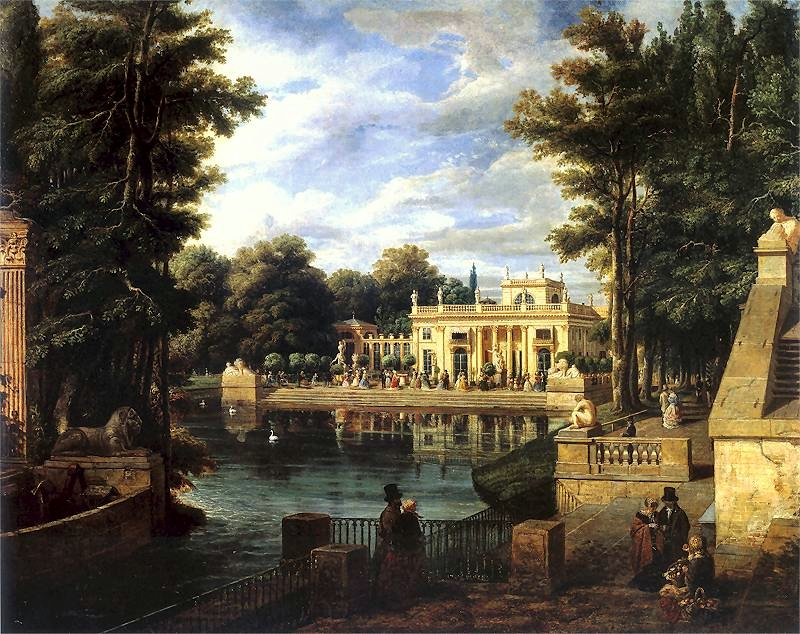
View of the Royal Baths Palace in Summer, Marcin Zaleski, ca. 1837

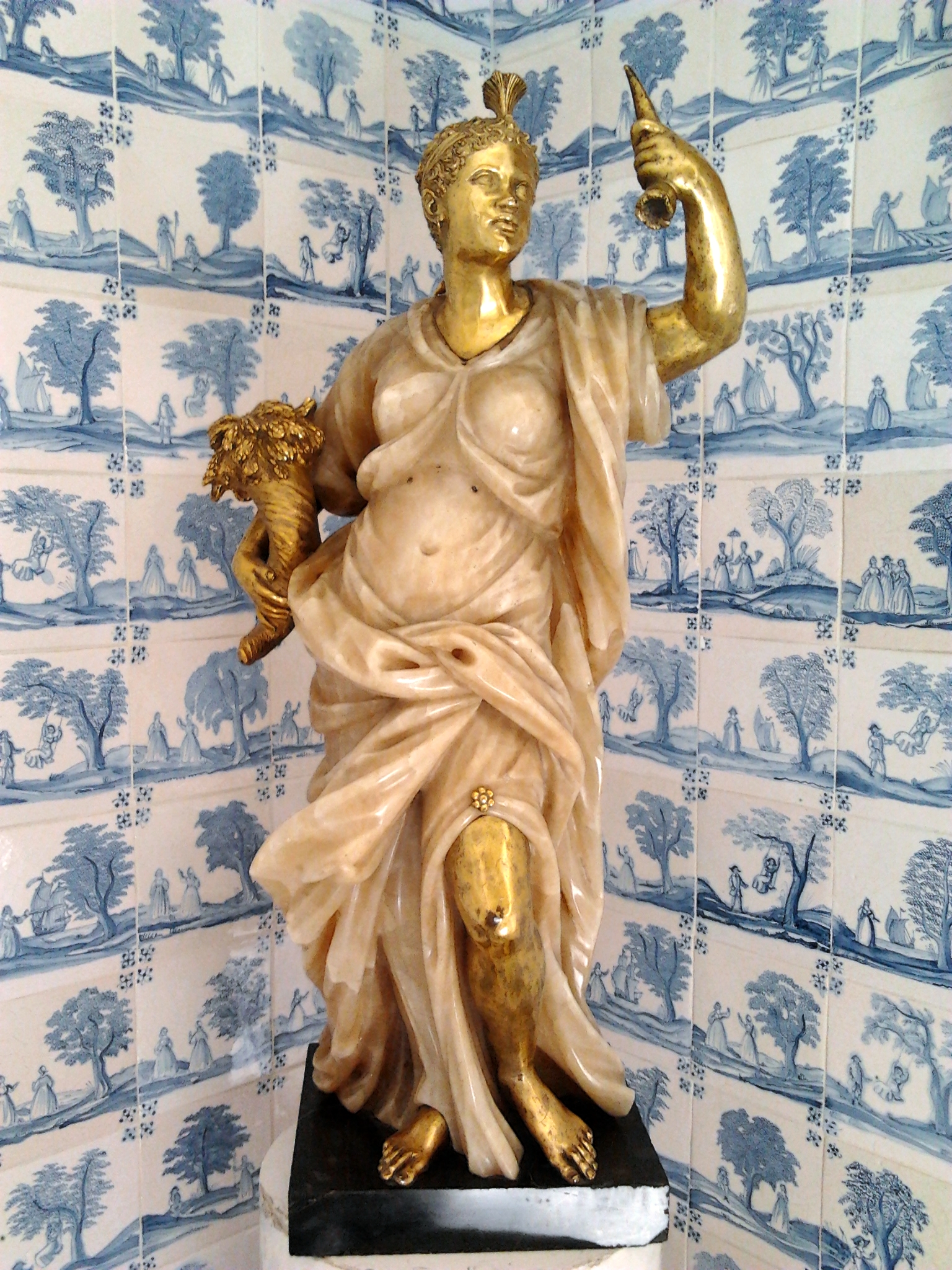
Allegory of Africa, turn of 17/18th century

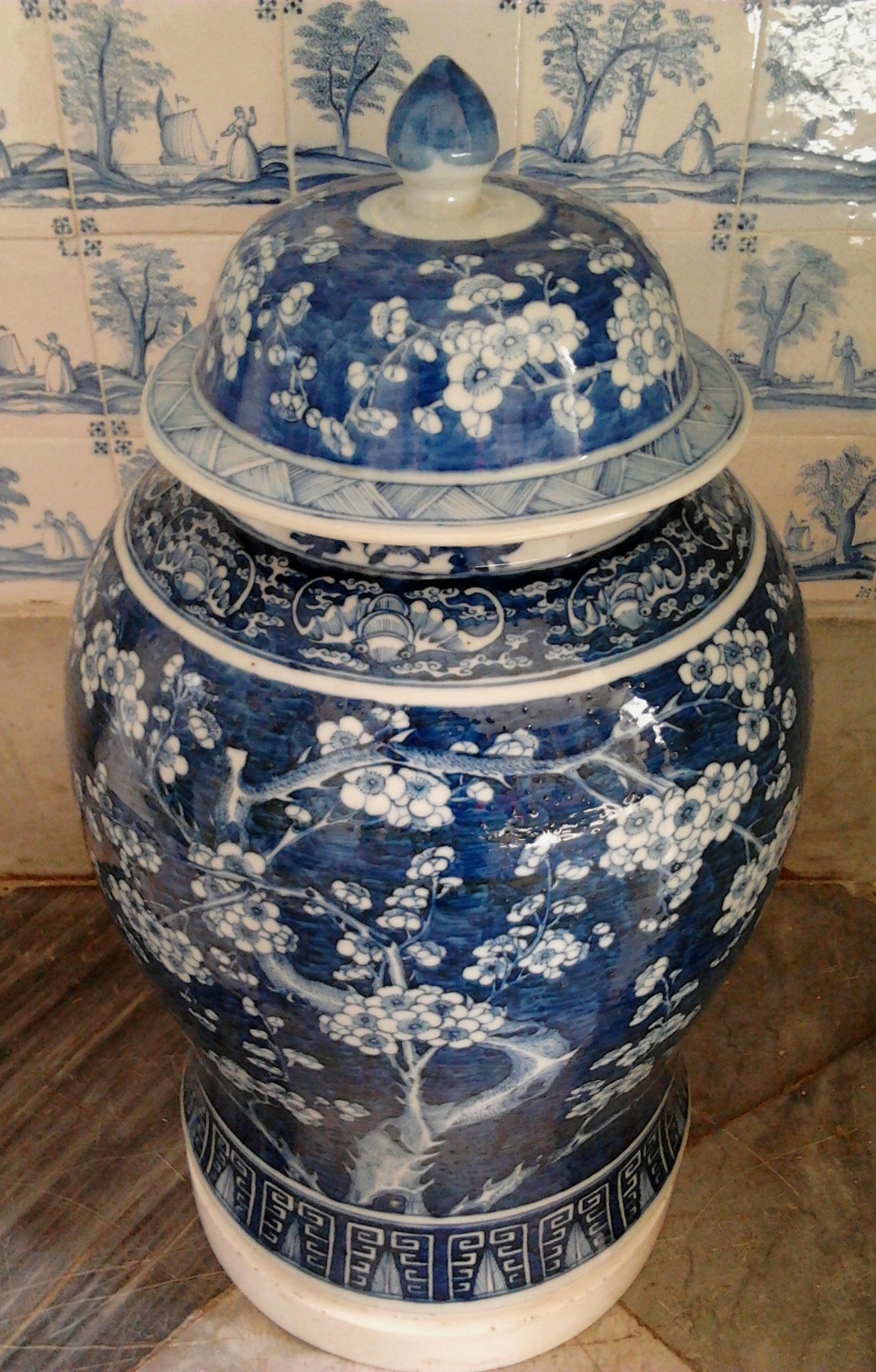
China earthenware, 18th century

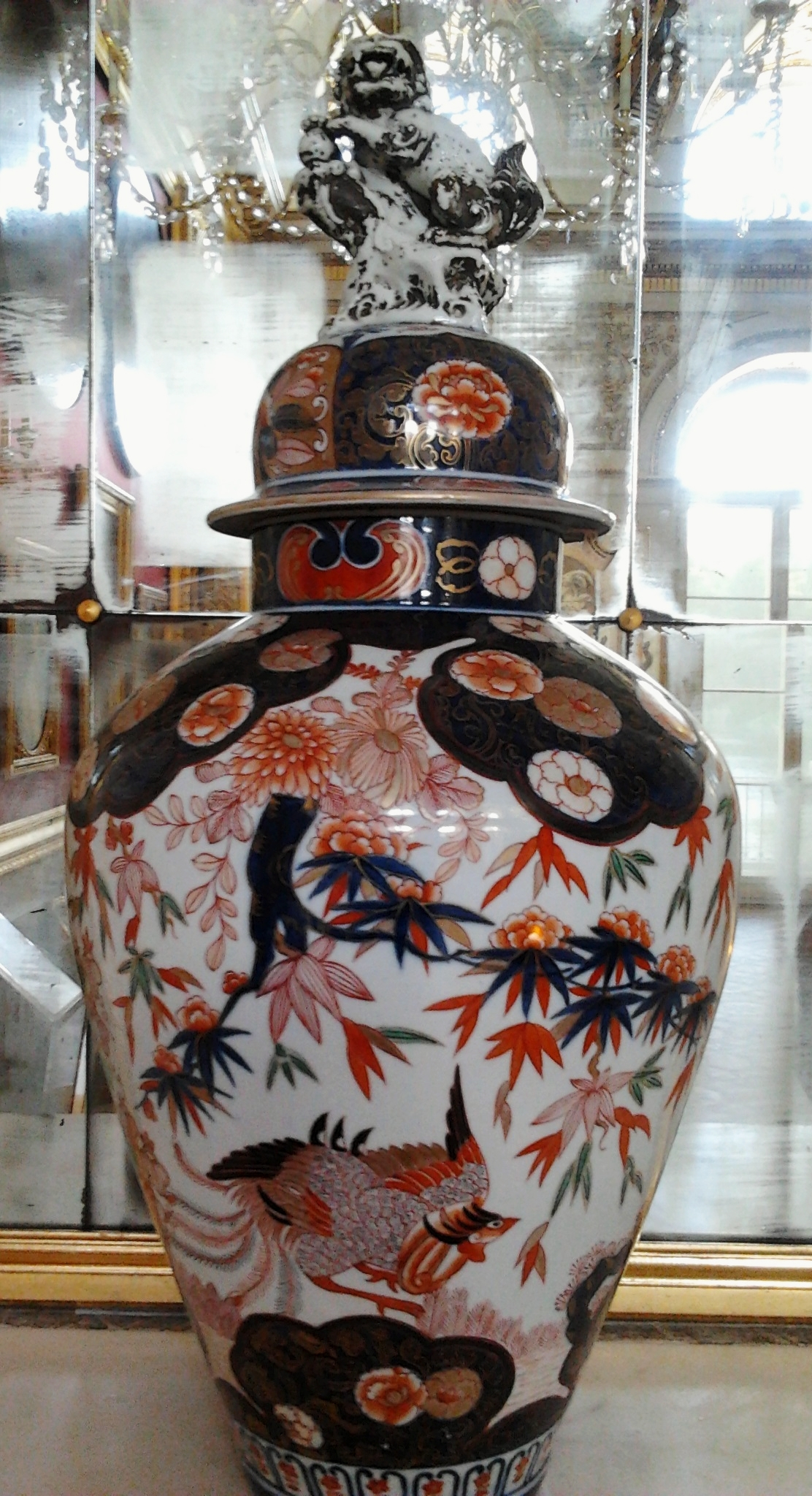
Japanese Imari vase with Foo Dog, late 18th century

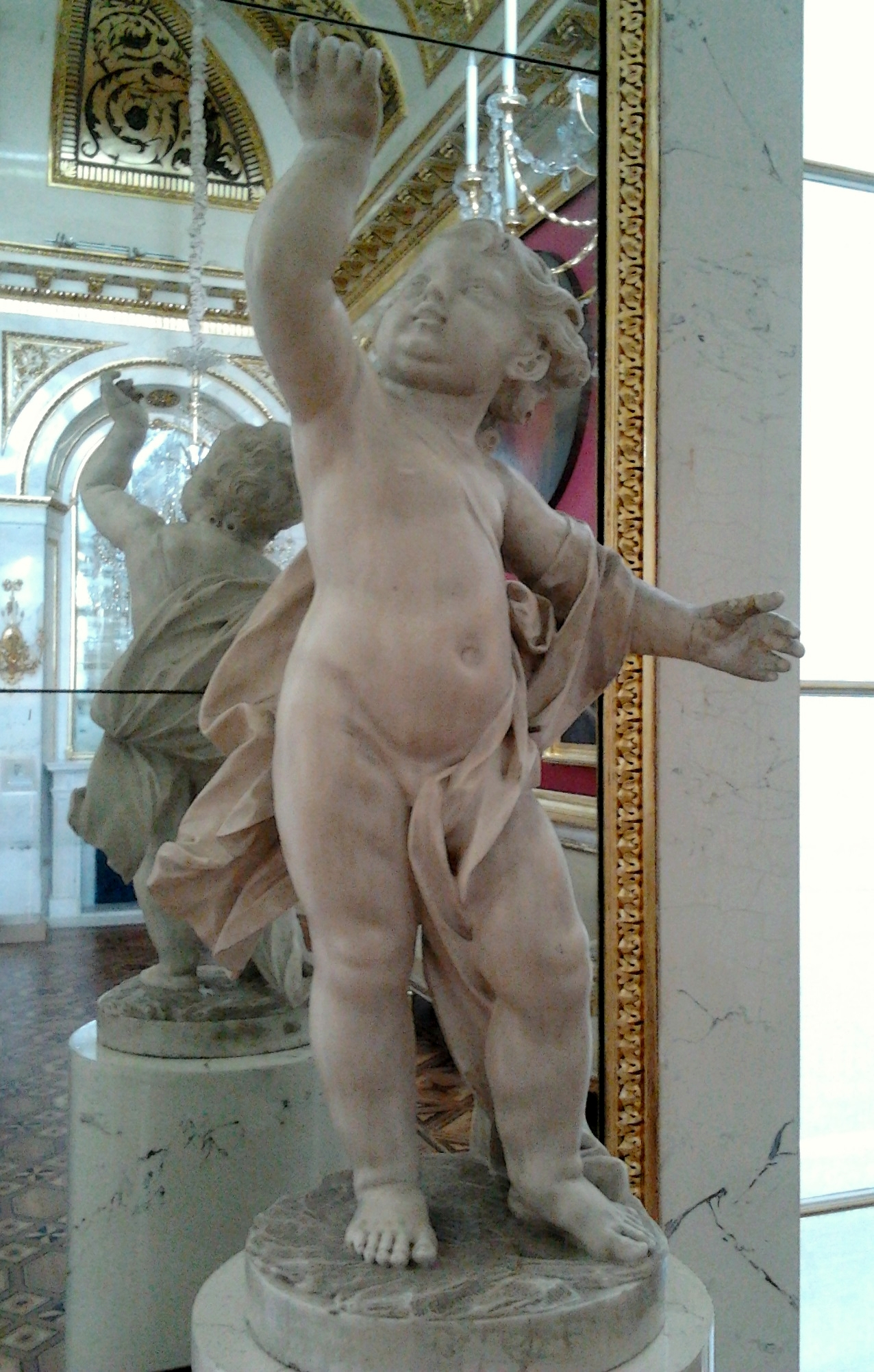
A Rococo putto by André Le Brun, ca. 1783

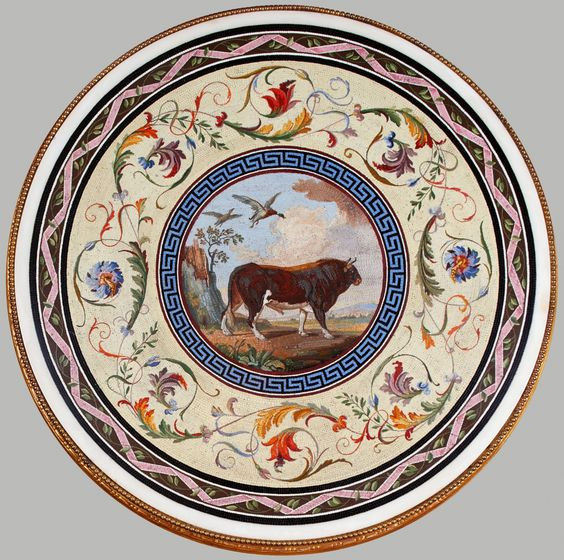
Table top with a bull by Pompeo Savini, ca. 1788

== See also ==
- Baroque in Poland
- Polish classicism
- List of palaces in Poland
- List of most visited palaces and monuments

== Bibliography ==
- Lorentz, Stanisław; Rottermund, Andrzej (1984). Klasycyzm w Polsce. Warsaw: Arkady. p. 254. ISBN 83-213-3082-7.
