= Johann Christian Kammsetzer =

Dresden-born architect

Jan Chrystian Kamsetzer
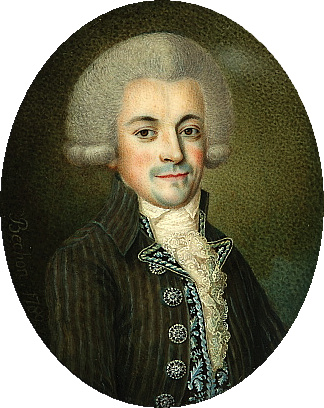
- Born: 1753; Dresden
- Died: 1795 (aged 41–42); Warsaw
- Burial place: Evangelical Augsburg Cemetery, Warsaw
- Occupation: architect

Johann Christian Kammsetzer or Jan Chrystian Kamsetzer (Dresden, 1753 – 25 November 1795, Warsaw) was a Dresden-born architect who was active primarily in Poland.

== Life ==
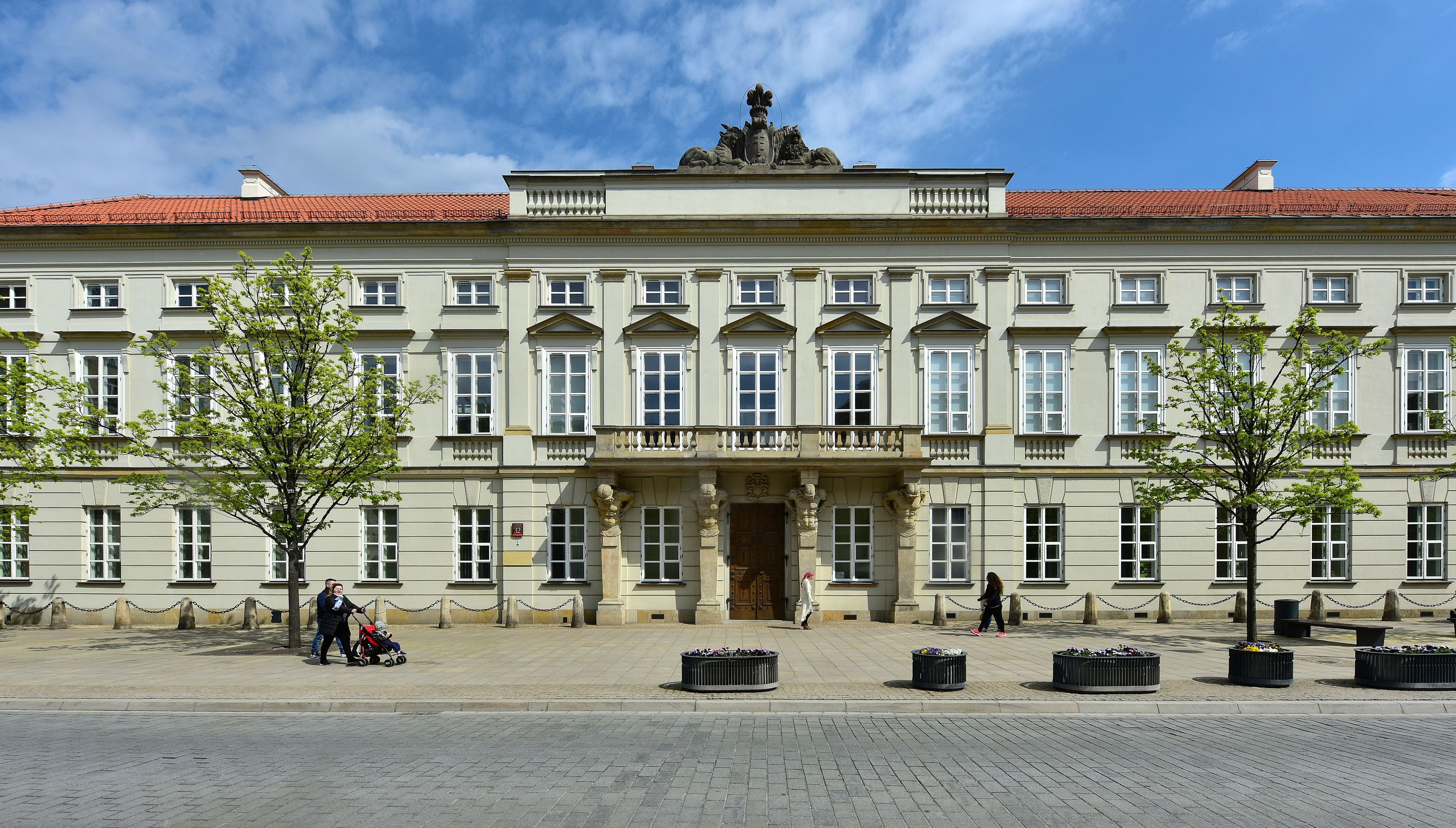
Tyszkiewicz Palace, Warsaw, completed 1792 to Kammsetzer's design

There is a record of Kammsetzer having attended the Dresden Academy of Fine Arts in 1771. From 1773 he worked for Poland's King Stanisław August Poniatowski. Together with Johann Christian Schuch and Domenico Merlini, he redesigned the King's Łazienki Park in Warsaw.

He also worked for other Polish nobility, e.g., for the Raczyńskis on their Rogalin Palace, and for Ludwik Tyszkiewicz on his palace in Warsaw.

Kammsetzer died, destitute, in Warsaw. On his deathbed he married his partner of many years, Marianna Manzet (also spelled Manget and Manchette), with whom he had a son.

== See also ==
- List of Poles
