= Alicja Abczyńska =

Polish nurse and resistance member (1900–1989)

Alicja Henryka Abczyńska (married name Kaltenberg-Abczyńska; 9 February 1900, Malkowicze – 26 May 1989), codename Ciocia Stasia (Auntie Stasia), was a Polish nurse and member of the Polish resistance. During the Warsaw Uprising, Abczyńska was a member of the Home Army Zośka Battalion in Old Town. Taken prisoner on 2 September 1944, Abczyńska was initially transported to Flossenbürg concentration camp before being transferred Ravensbrück. Abczyńska remained at Ravensbrück until the camp was liberated on 28 April 1945.

Abczyńska was awarded the Warsaw Uprising Cross, the Order of Polonia Restituta, the Auschwitz Cross, the Medal of Victory and Freedom and the Odznaka Grunwaldzka. On 26 May 1989, Abczyńska died in Warsaw and was buried at the Evangelical Augsburg Cemetery.
