= Ryszard Nawrocki =

Polish film, stage, and voice actor (1940–2011)

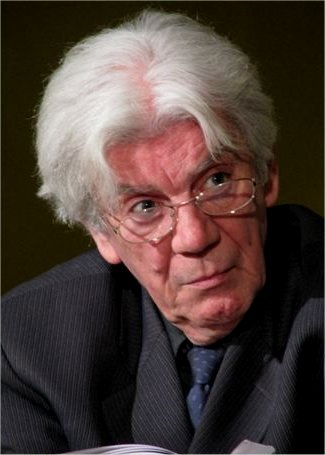
- Born: 7 March 1940; Toruń, Poland
- Died: 25 April 2011 (aged 71); Żyrardów, Poland
- Occupations: Actor, voice artist
- Years active: 1965–2010

Ryszard Nawrocki (7 March 1940 – 25 April 2011) was a Polish film and stage actor, known for his voice skills and work in the dubbing industry.

== Biography ==
In 1966 he graduated from the Aleksander Zelwerowicz State Theatre Academy. Since 1969 until the death he worked in Polish Theatre in Warsaw. In 1988 he was awarded with Polish Silver Cross of Merit.

As a voice actor he dubbed many characters from animated films, including Rabbit from Winnie-the-Pooh, Cogsworth from Beauty and the Beast, Iago From Aladdin The Return Of Jafar (1994 Movie) Zazu from The Lion King. Porky Pig and Asterix.

He was buried at the Evangelical Augsburg Cemetery, Warsaw.

== Selected filmography ==
- 1968: Przygoda z piosenką
- 1974: Czterdziestolatek (TV series)
- 1974: Wiosna panie sierżancie
- 1978: Życie na gorąco
- 1988: W labiryncie (TV series)
- 1988-1991: Pogranicze w ogniu (TV series)
- 1989: Stan strachu
- 1995: Uczeń diabła
- 2006: Mrok
- 2007: Pitbull (TV series)
- 2010: Fenomen
