= Domenico Merlini =

Italian-Polish architect (1730–1797)

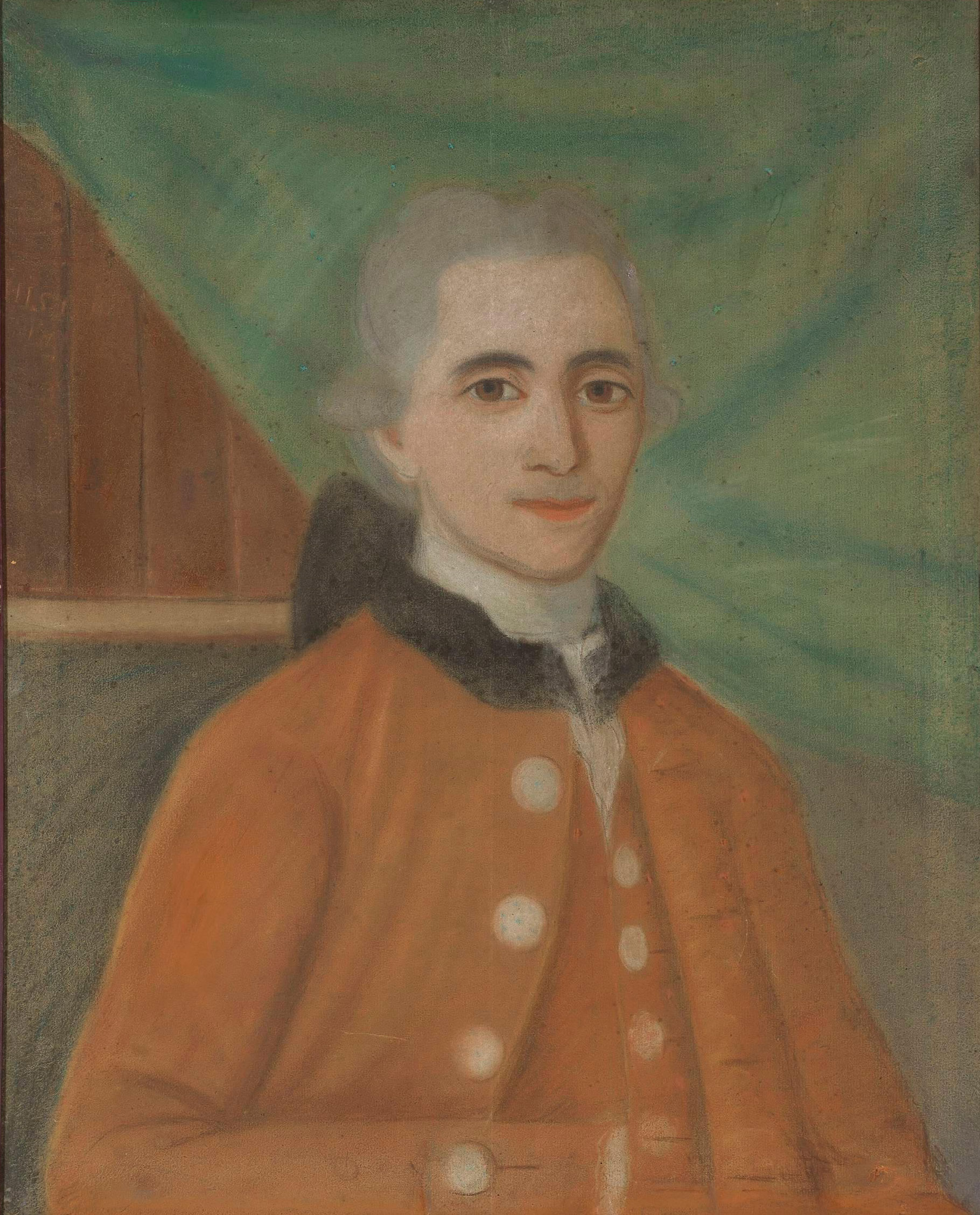
Domenico Merlini

Domenico Merlini (Polish: Dominik Merlini) (22 February 1730 – 20 February 1797) was an Italian-Polish architect whose work was mostly in the classical style.

== Life and Style ==
From 1750 till his death, Merlini lived in Poland. In 1768, he became a nobleman and later in 1773 the Royal Architect. He is most famous for his Royal Baths Park in Warsaw.

He built a number of public and private buildings in Warsaw and other Polish cities, often in collaboration with Jan Chrystian Kamsetzer and Johann Christian Schuch. His style is typical of the Polish classicism in Warsaw in the era of Stanisław August Poniatowski. Merlini was partly influenced by Palladio and carried some late-baroque elements in his work, such as the abundant use of gold.

== Works ==
- Refurbishment of Ujazdów Castle from 1766 until 1771
- Refurbishment of the library in the Royal Castle from 1776 until 1786
- The Łazienki Park, including the Łazienki Palace and several other buildings
- Palace in Opole Lubelskie
- Palace in Jabłonna from 1775 until 1779
- Palace in Królikarnia from 1782 until 1786
- Rebuilding of the Krasiński's Palace in Warsaw, 1783
- Refurbishment of the Brühl Palace
- Greek Catholic church in Warsaw
