= Thursday Dinners =

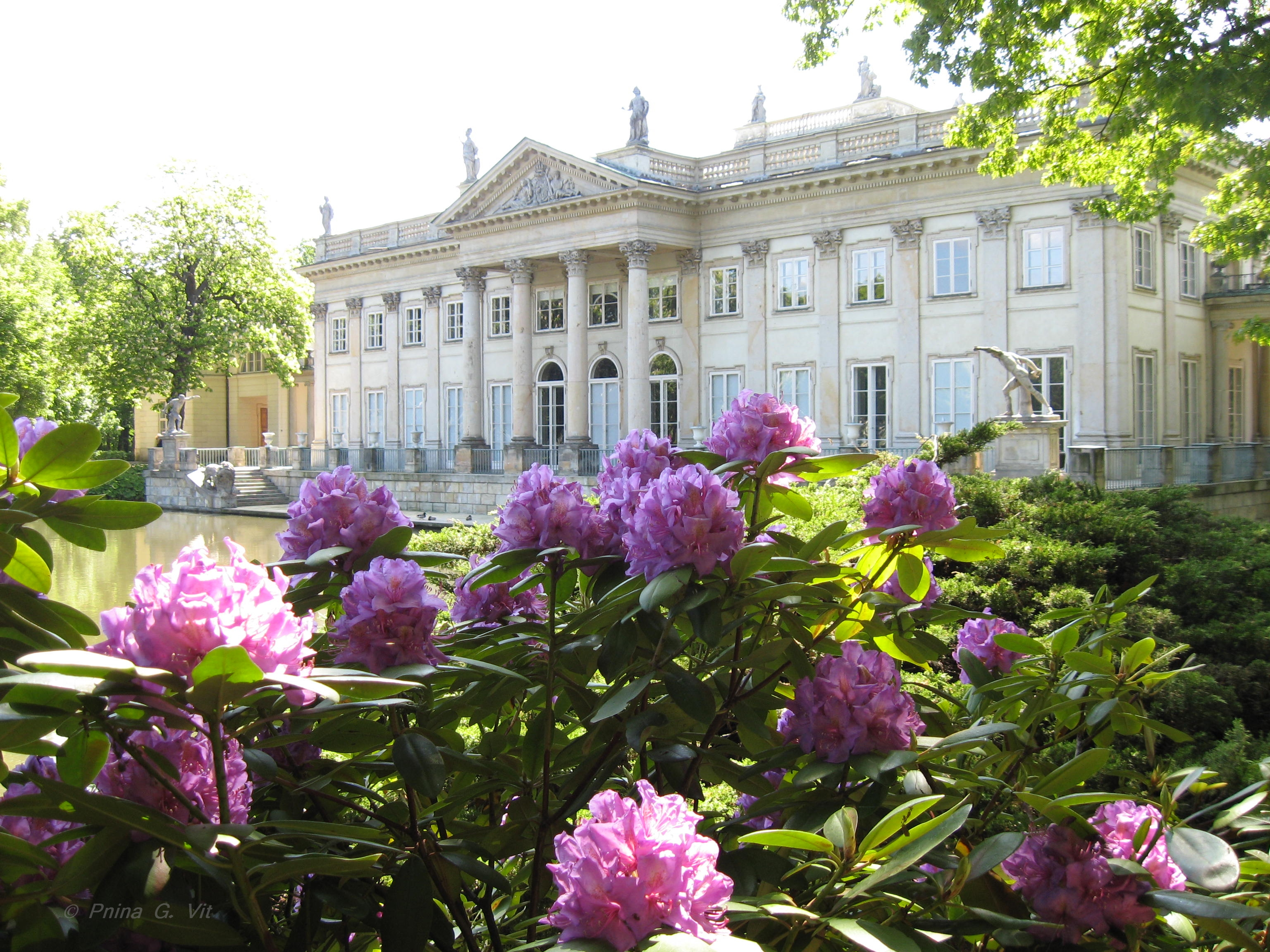
Neoclassical Palace on the Isle at the Royal Baths Park where the dinners were held in summer

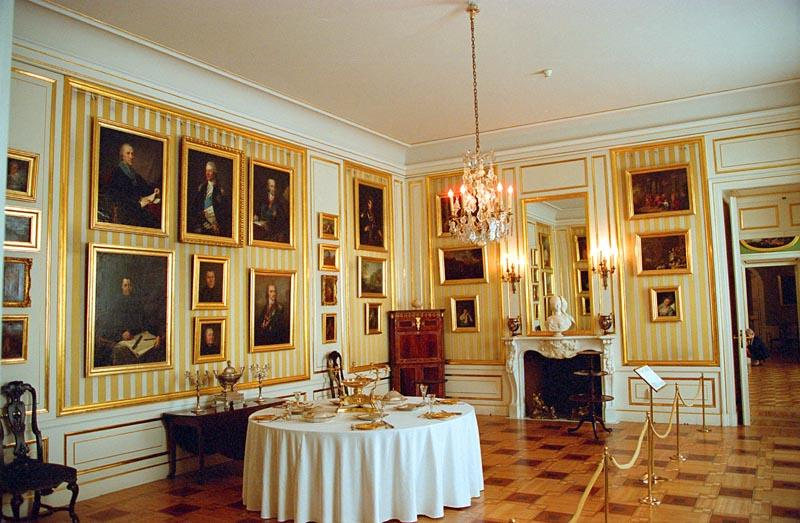
The Warsaw Royal Castle chamber where dignitaries would dine with the King

Thursday Dinners (Polish: obiady czwartkowe, less commonly translated as Thursday Lunches) were gatherings of artists, intellectuals, architects, politicians and statesmen held by the last King of Poland, Stanislaus II Augustus during the Enlightenment period in Poland.

== History ==
Stanislaus Augustus Poniatowski was famed as a patron of the arts and learning. It was during his reign that Poland's Age of Enlightenment (already begun in the 1730s–40s), reached its peak. It went into decline with the Third Partition of Poland in 1795. During the Age of Enlightenment, Warsaw was modernised and became a favourite meeting place for notable people in the worlds of art, architecture and literature along with other intellectuals and statesmen. The King invited influential figures of the time to his Thursday Dinners. He founded the School of Chivalry.

The gatherings were usually held in the Royal Castle and in summer at the Palace on the Isle in Warsaw, between 1770 and 1784. During the gatherings, which typically lasted three hours and were akin to French salons, the King and his guests discussed literature, art and politics over a light meal. The number of guests varied over the years, with about thirty regulars, including politicians, writers, bibliophiles, military officers of rank and philosophers. Notable guests included:

- Ignacy Krasicki
- Franciszek Bohomolec
- Adam Naruszewicz
- Ignacy Potocki
- Stanisław Kostka Potocki
- Hugo Kołłątaj
- Jan Śniadecki and Jędrzej Śniadecki
- Stanisław Konarski
- Tomasz Adam Ostrowski
- Józef Szymanowski
- Andrzej Zamoyski.

The king also held less well-known Wednesday Dinners, Obiady Środowe. While the guests at the Thursday Dinners were usually writers, poets and artists, the Wednesday Dinners brought together educators, scientists and political activists.

The Thursday Dinners spawned the first Polish literary magazine, Zabawy Przyjemne i Pożyteczne - "Diversions Pleasurable and Useful", published from 1770 to 1777.

In the 1990s, Warsaw Mayor Paweł Piskorski reinstated the tradition by holding Tuesday Breakfasts to talk over current issues with leading businessmen and activists.

== See also ==
- List of dining events
