= Johann Christian Schuch =

German-born garden designer and architect in Poland (1752–1813)

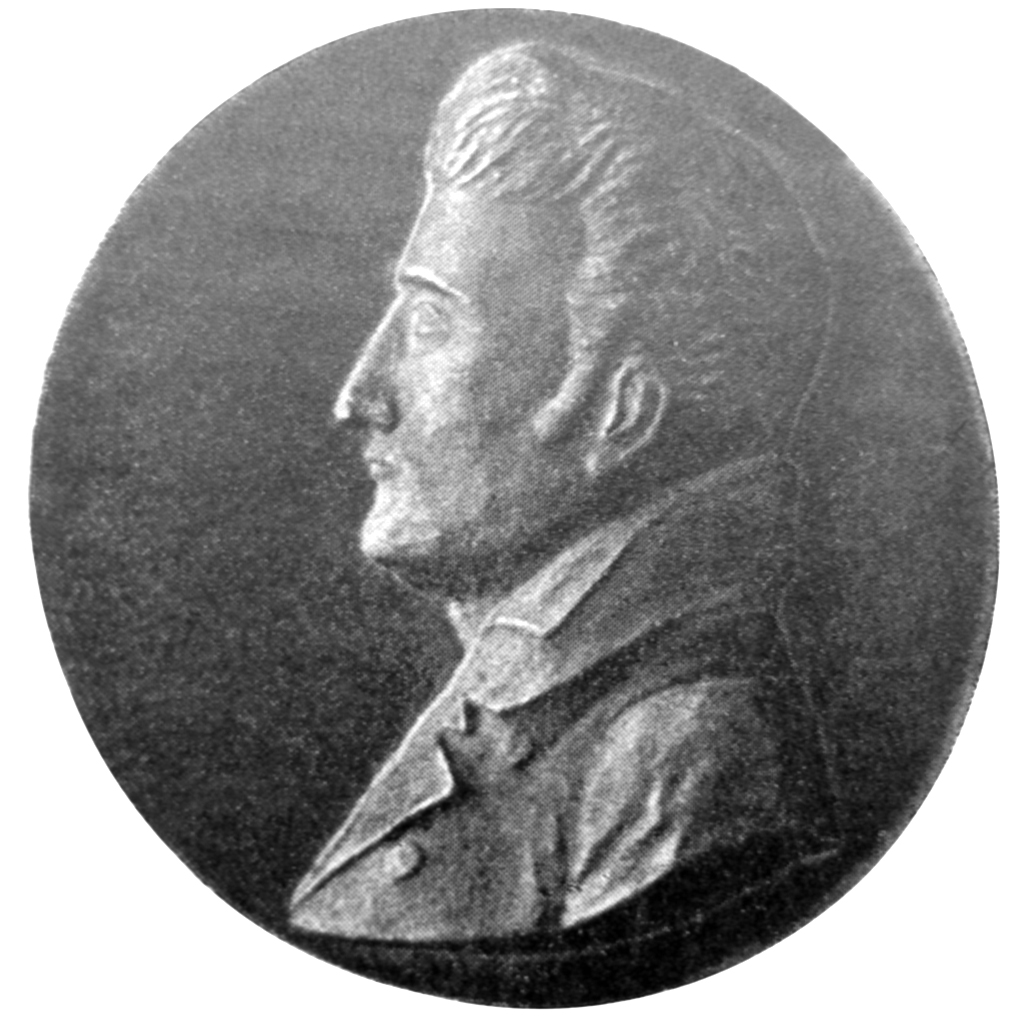
- Born: 1752; Dresden, Electorate of Saxony, Holy Roman Empire
- Died: 1813 (aged 60–61); Warsaw, Duchy of Warsaw
- Burial place: Evangelical Augsburg Cemetery, Warsaw
- Other name: Jan Chrystian Szuch
- Occupations: garden designer, architect

Johann Christian Schuch (or Jan Chrystian Szuch; 1752 – 28 June 1813) was a German-born garden designer and architect, active in Poland.

== Life ==
Schuch learned gardening from his father, a House of Wettin court gardener. Later he studied painting and civil engineering at the Dresden Academy of Fine Arts, and to complete his education he traveled extensively, visiting gardens at Kew, the Grand Trianon, and the Schönbrunn Palace.

In 1775, Schuch came to Poland, where he worked for Princess Izabela Lubomirska and Count Michał Jerzy Mniszech. From 1781 he was superintendent of royal gardens at the Warsaw court of King Stanisław August Poniatowski, for whom he, together with Domenico Merlini and Jan Chrystian Kamsetzer, redesigned Łazienki Park. The King gave him a large estate bordering Łazienki Park, thus securing his prosperity. There Schuch established Poland's first fruit-tree nursery, experimenting with novel methods of protecting the trees from excessive sun and frost, until the abnormally harsh winter of 1802–3 caused a substantial financial loss.

After the king's abdication in 1795, Schuch worked for many Polish aristocratic families.

In 1811 he became a member of the Warsaw Society of Friends of Learning, before which he presented a number of papers on diverse subjects.

He married Ludwika Wolska, and they had many children. Only one son, Adolf Grzegorz, is known by name.

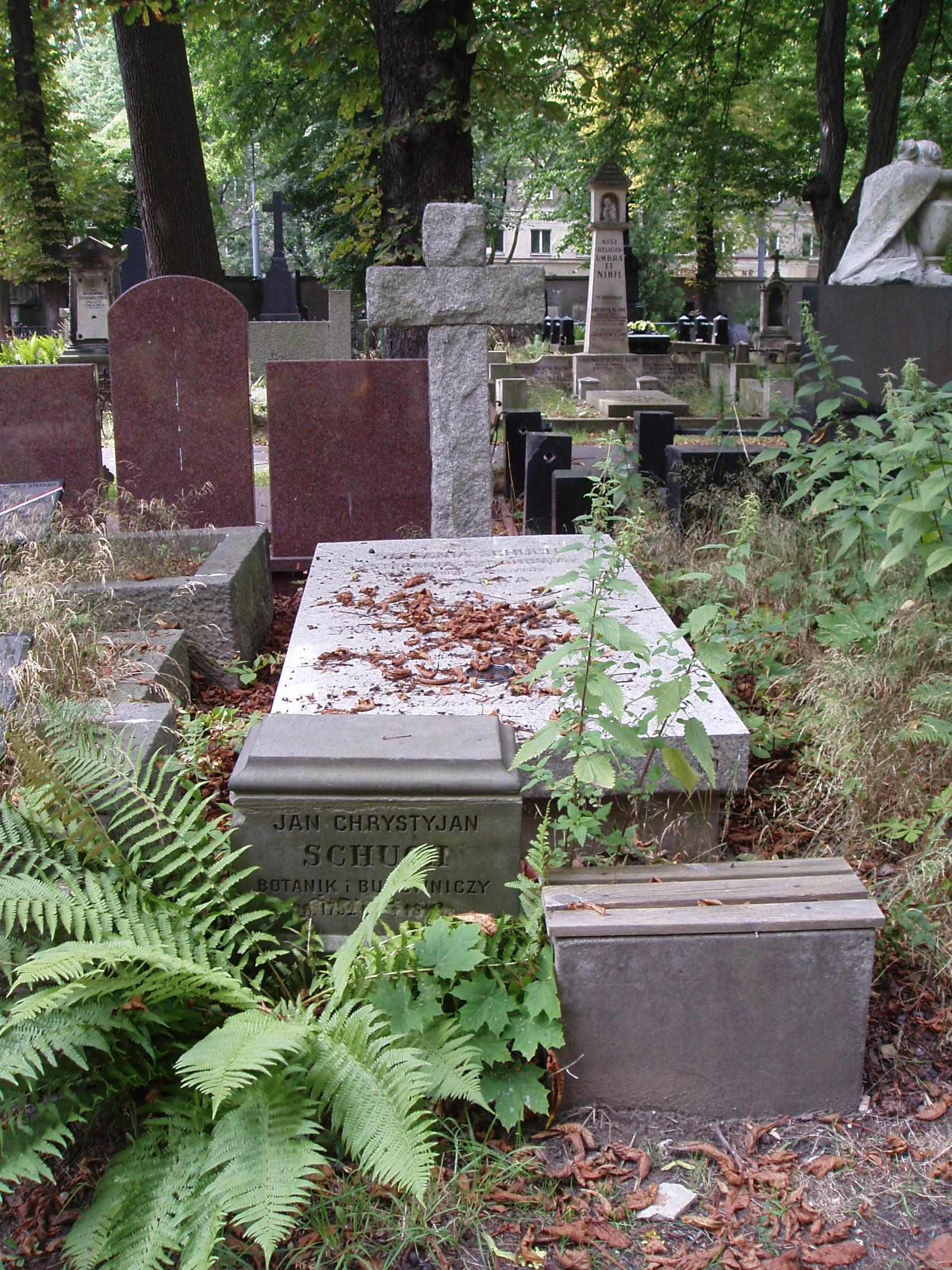
Graves of Schuch and family members in Warsaw's Protestant Cemetery

Schuch died in Warsaw and is buried there in the Evangelical Cemetery of the Augsburg Confession in Warsaw.

== Legacy ==
After his death, his name was given to Aleja Szucha (Szuch Avenue), west of the Royal Baths Park, where his estate was once located. Here, at no. 25, in 1939–45, during World War II, were the infamous headquarters of Nazi German security services for the Warsaw district. The building's basement housed a Gestapo jail where Polish resistance fighters were tortured and killed. During the Warsaw Uprising of August – October 1944, mass executions of Poles took place here. The site is now preserved as a museum, known as the Mausoleum of Struggle and Martyrdom.

== See also ==
- List of Poles
