= Evangelical Augsburg Cemetery, Warsaw =

Evangelical Cemetery of the Augsburg Confession in Warsaw
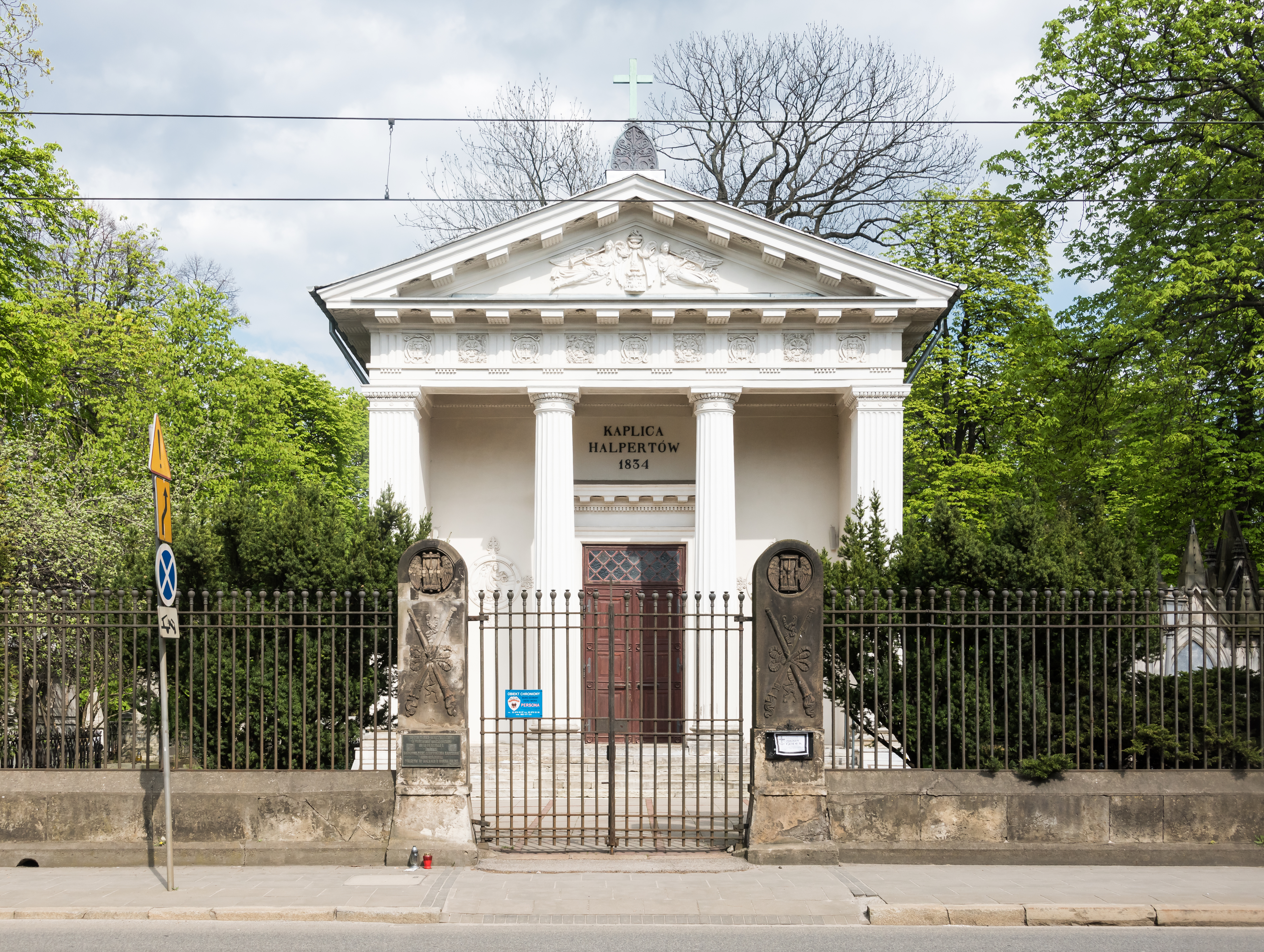
- The cemetery chapel
- Interactive map of Evangelical Cemetery of the Augsburg Confession in Warsaw

Details
- Established: 1792
- Location: Warsaw
- Country: Poland
- Coordinates: 52°14′29″N 20°58′16″E
- Type: Protestant cemetery
- Owned by: Evangelical Church of the Augsburg Confession in Poland
- No. of interments: 100,000+ people
- Website: Official website

The Evangelical Augsburg Cemetery (Polish: Cmentarz ewangelicko-augsburski w Warszawie), is a historic Lutheran Protestant necropolis located in the western Wola district of Warsaw, Poland.

== Details ==
The Evangelical Cemetery of the Augsburg Confession was consecrated on 2 May 1792, designed by the architect Szymon Bogumił Zug. More than 100,000 people have been buried at the cemetery since its opening in 1792. During the Kościuszko Uprising of 1794 and during World War II, intense fighting took place at the cemetery. Worth seeing is the neoclassical Halpert family chapel (1835), which serves the Lutheran community. The chapel was rebuilt in 1975, however, many historic and monumental tombstones are in need of restoration. As in the Roman Catholic Powązki Cemetery, a committee for the restoration of the cemetery has been established, and collects money on All Saints' Day for the treasures of the burial ground to be returned to their former glory.

== Selected notable burials ==
A few of the notable people buried here:

- Alicja Abczyńska (1900–1989), nurse and member of the Polish resistance
- Juliusz Bursche (1862–1942), bishop of the Evangelical-Augsburg Church in Poland. A vocal opponent of Nazi Germany, after the German invasion of Poland in 1939 he was arrested by the Germans, tortured, and sent to Sachsenhausen concentration camp where he died
- Wojciech Gerson (1831–1901), Polish painter and professor
- Samuel Linde (1771–1847), Polish linguist, librarian, and lexicographer of the Polish language
- Johann Christian Schuch (1752–1813), Dresden-born garden designer and architect, active in Poland
- Szymon Bogumił Zug (1733–1807), Polish-German classicist architect and designer of gardens
- Karol Ernest Wedel (1813–1902), Polish-German entrepreneur and founder of Poland's most famous chocolate brand E. Wedel
- Wiesław Wernic (1906−1986), popular Polish writer and journalist, best known for his series of Wild West books, sometimes called "Polish Karl May"
- Edward Kłosiński (1943−2008), Polish cinematographer
- Michalina Wisłocka (1921−2005), Polish gynecologist, sexologist, and author of Sztuka kochania (The Art of Loving, 1976)
- Gabriela Kownacka (1952−2010), Polish film and theater actress
- Adam Pilch (1965–2010), military chaplain
- Ryszard Nawrocki (1940–2011), actor

== Gallery ==
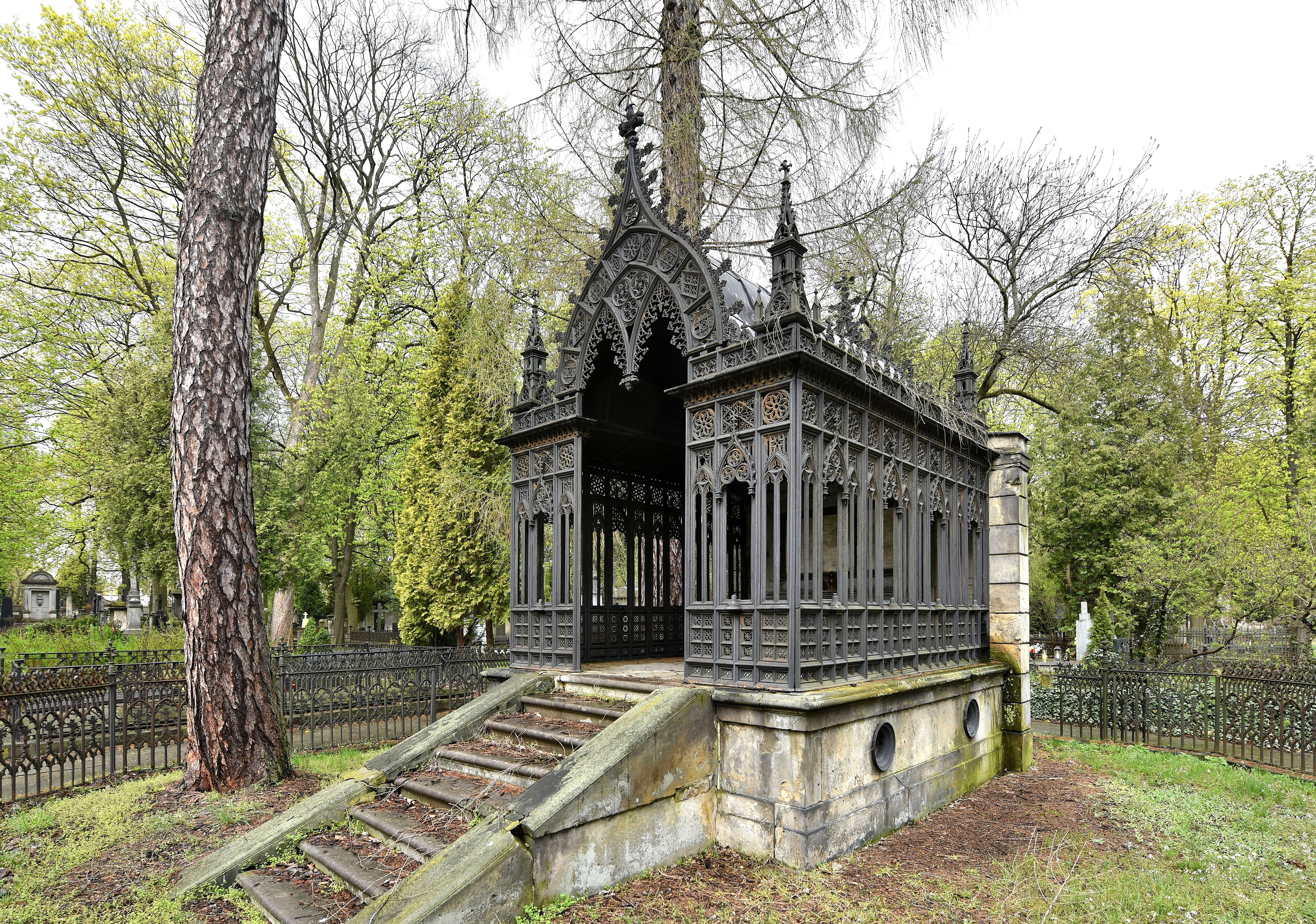

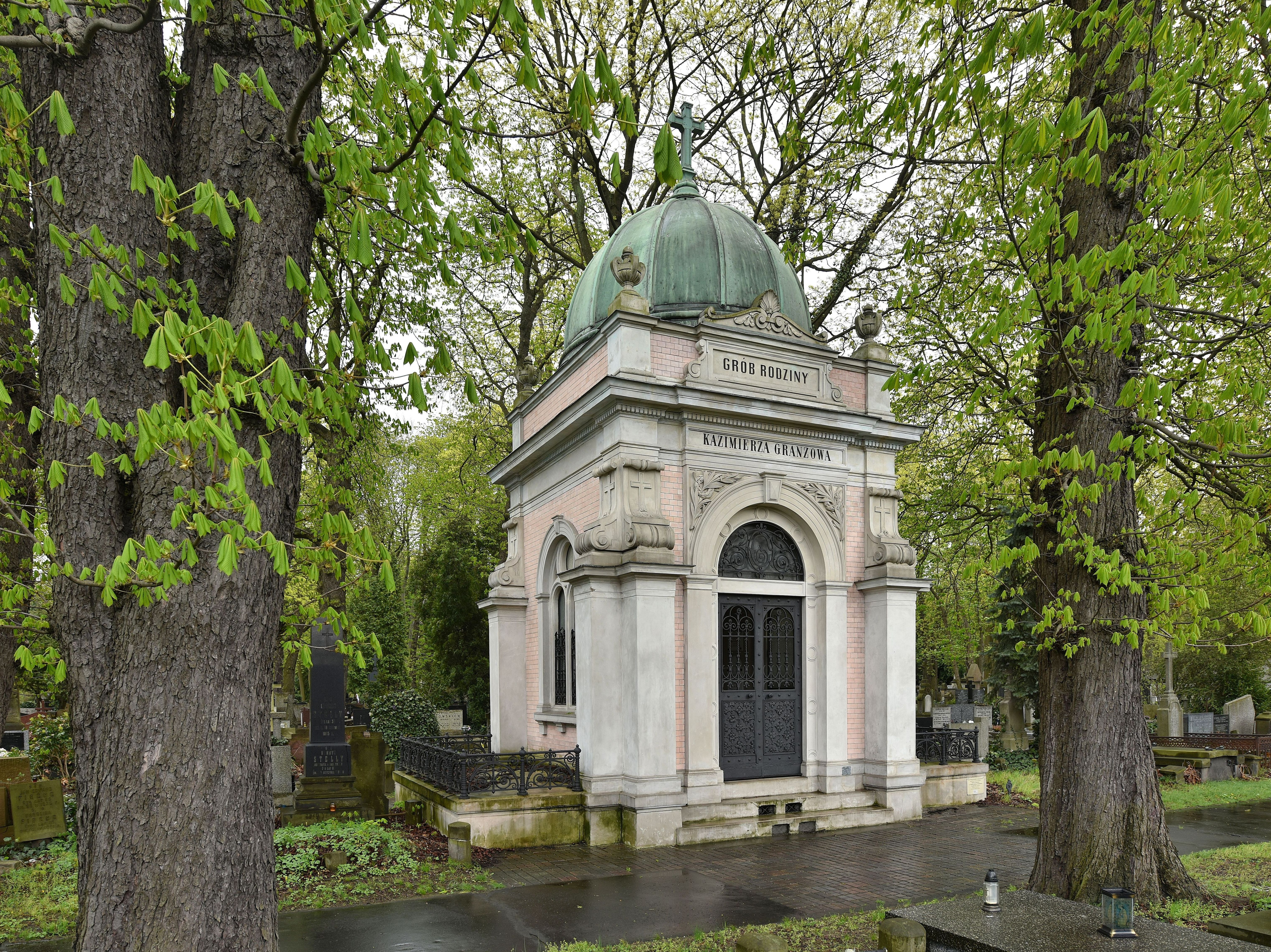

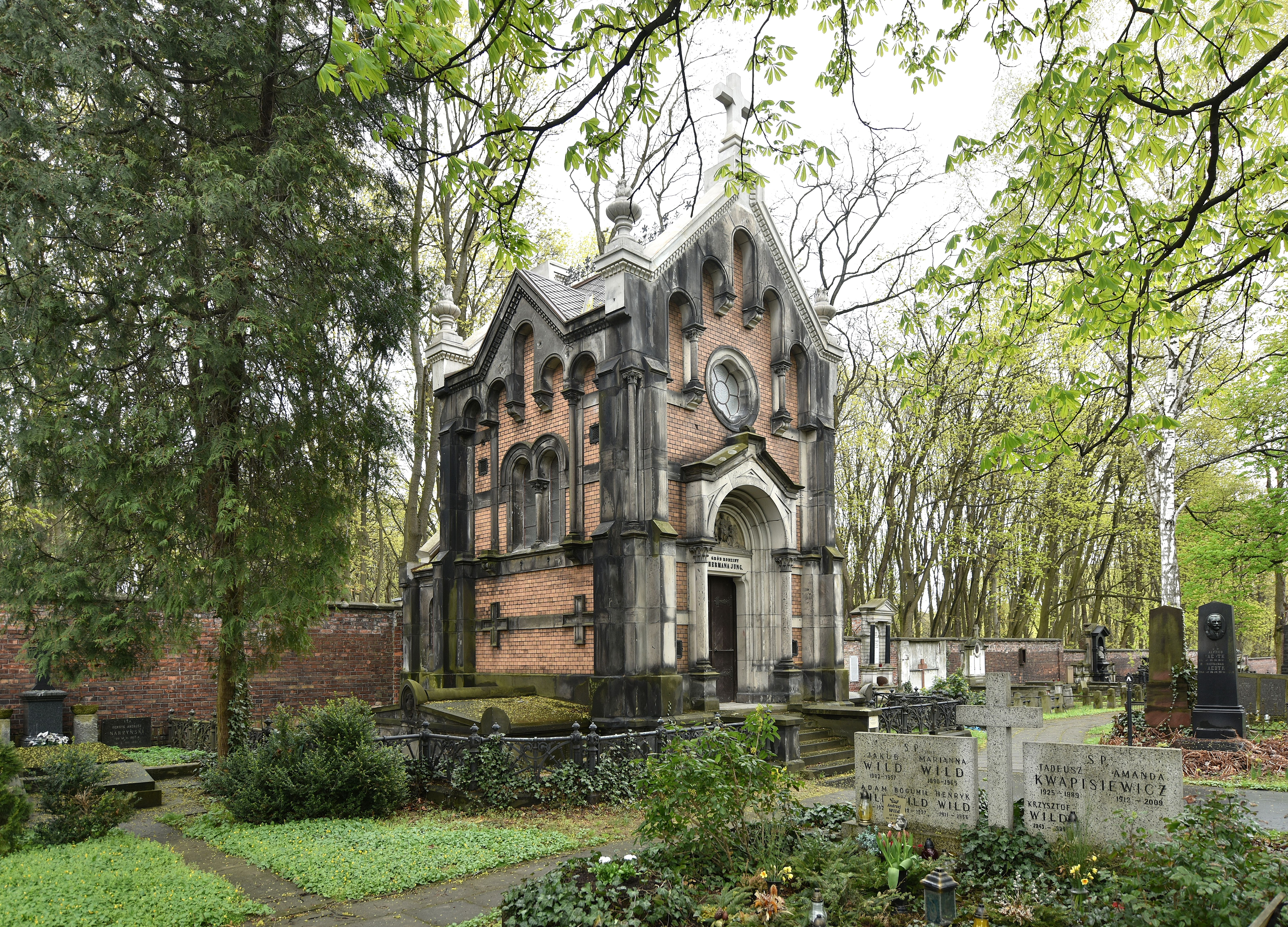

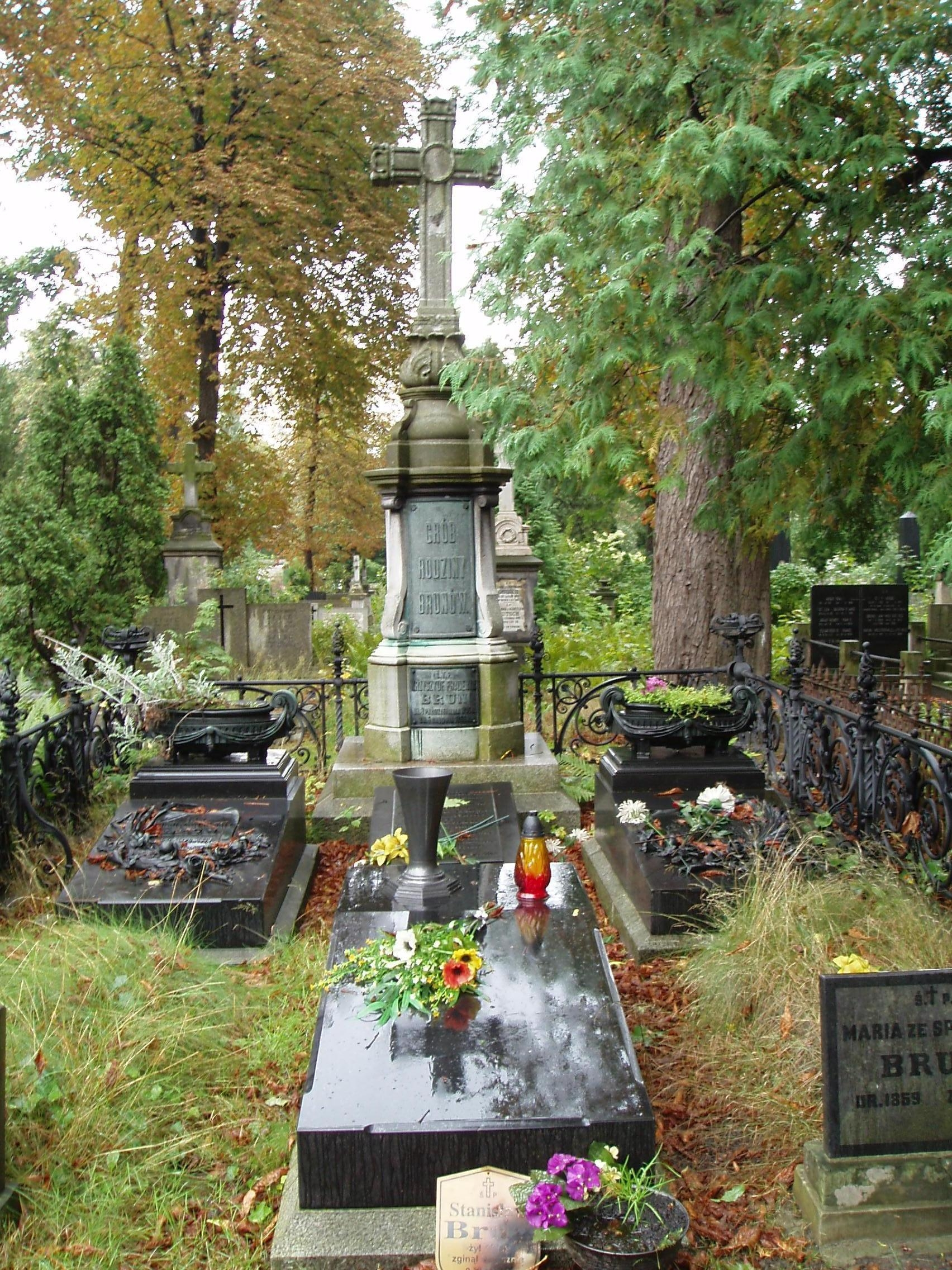

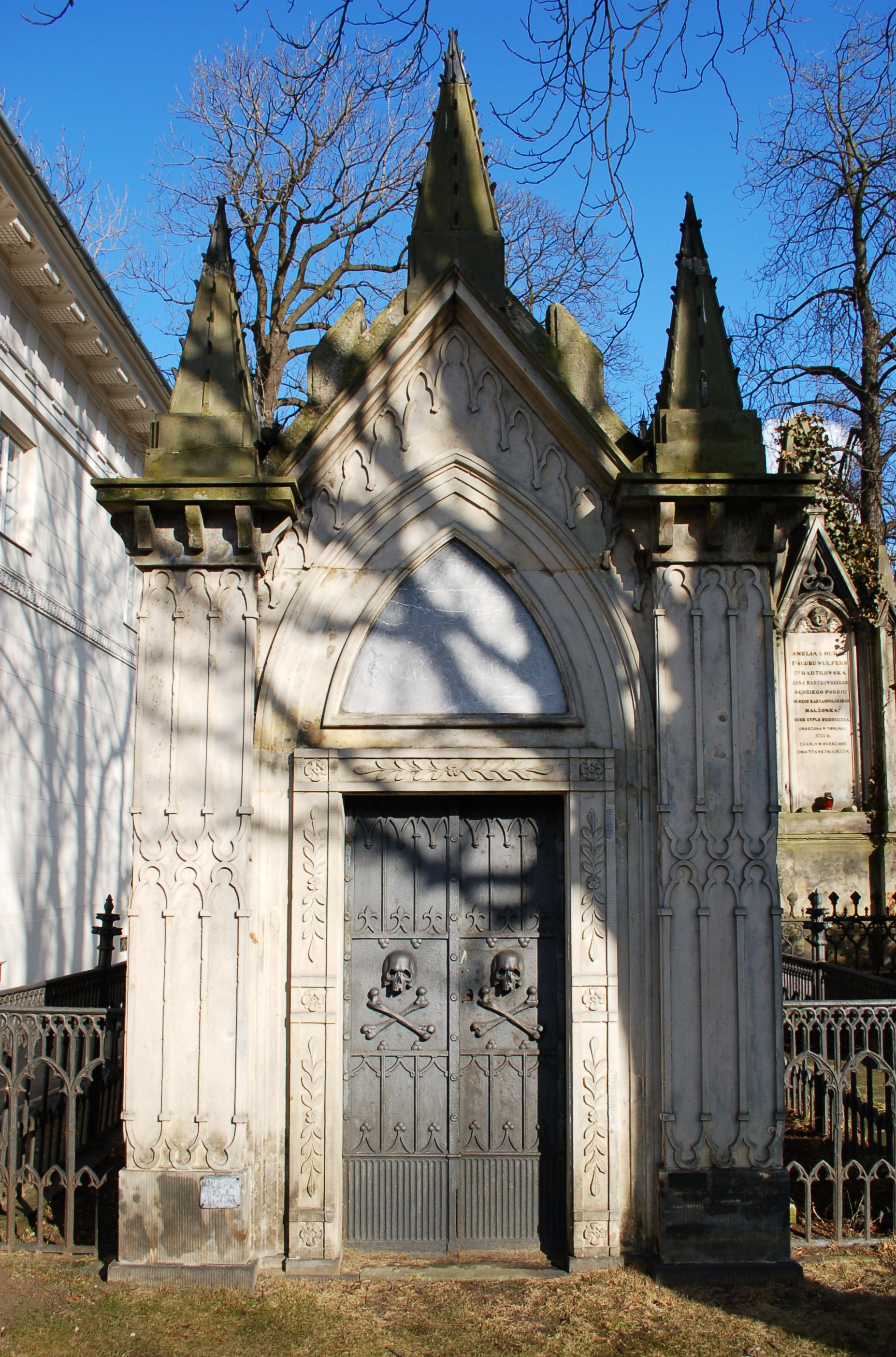

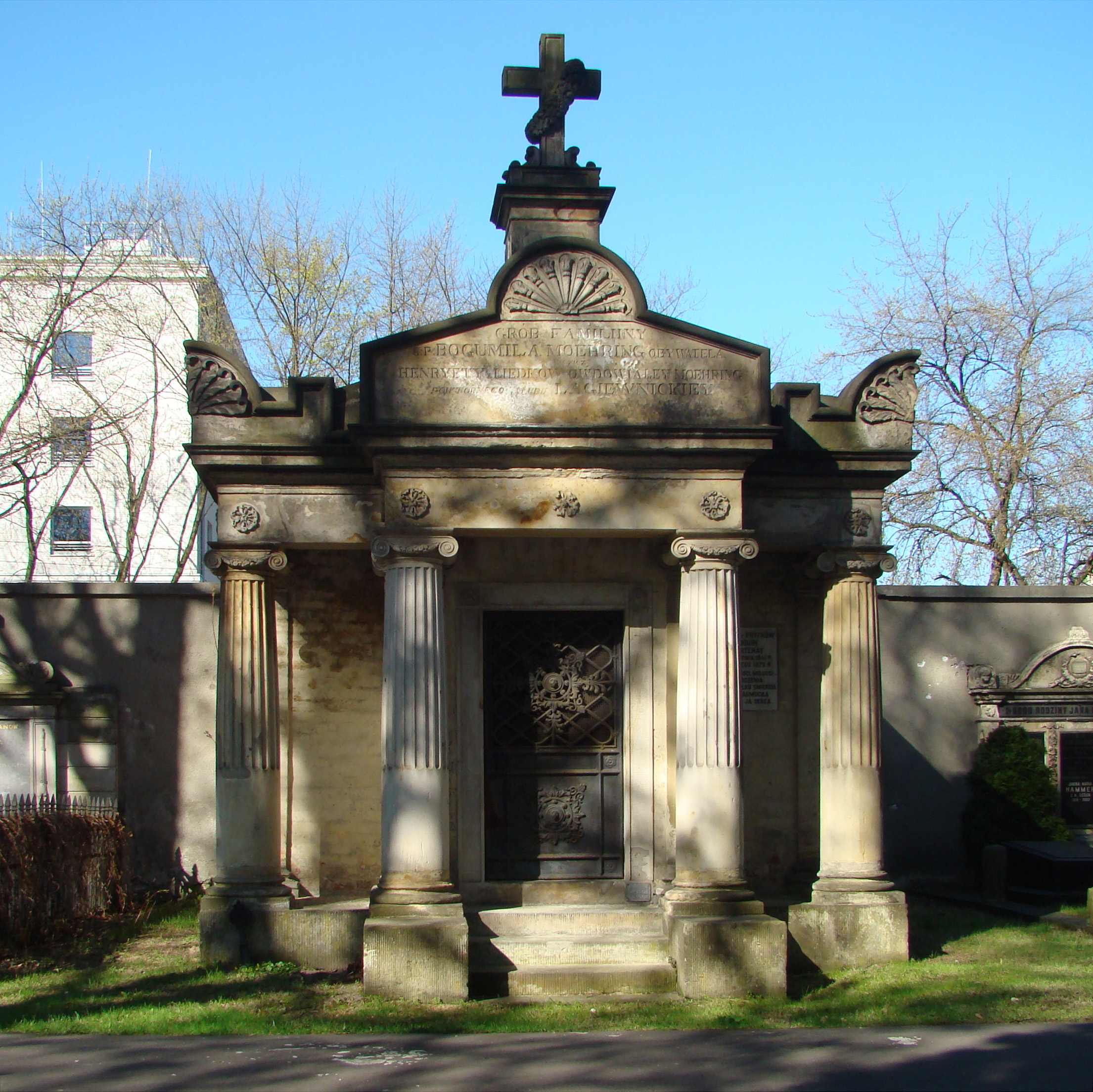

The collection of historical tombstones (the lapidarium)

== See also ==
- Evangelical Church of the Augsburg Confession in Poland
- Evangelical Reformed Cemetery, Warsaw, neighbouring necropolis
