= Wiesław Wernic =

Polish writer and journalist

Wiesław Wernic (28 February 1906 in Warsaw, 1 August 1986), popular Polish writer and journalist, best known for his series of Wild West books, sometimes called "Polish Karl May".

During World War II he was a member of the Home Army and fought in the Warsaw Uprising, and after the war he worked for a Polish daily Rzeczpospolita and weekly Tygodnik Demokratyczny. His first stories were published in 1927, he returned to writing in the sixties when he wrote his first Wild West book Tropy wiodą przez prerię. Over the next 30 years he wrote 20 books about the adventures of Doctor John (Jan in Polish; his alter ego) and his friend Charles (Karol in Polish) Gordon. Unlike Karl May to whom he was often compared, Wernic visited United States a number of times where he met with American Indians and was a leading authority on the history and customs of the Wild West.

Some of his books were translated into German, Slovak, Romanian and Czech languages. He sold well over 2,000,000 books in Poland and over 350,000 in other languages.

== Works ==
- Tropy wiodą przez prerię 1965 (Spuren führen durch die Prärie in German, Stopy vedu cez preriu in Slovak, Stopy vedou prerii in Czech)
- Szeryf z Fort Benton 1966 (Der Sheriff von Fort Benton in German, Serif z Fort Betonu in Slovak, SSeriful din Fort Benton in Romanian)
- Słońce Arizony 1967 (Die Sonne von Arizona in German, Slunce Arizony in Czech)
- Colorado 1969 (Colorado in German)
- Płomień w Oklahomie 1970
- Łapacz z Sacramento 1970
- Człowiek z Montany 1972
- Gwiazda trapera 1972
- Wędrowny handlarz 1973
- Przez góry Montany 1974
- Na południe od Rio Grande 1975
- Ucieczka z Wichita Falls 1976
- Barry Bede 1977
- Old Gray 1978
- Skarby McKenzie 1980
- Znikające stado 1982
- Wołanie dalekich wzgórz 1983
- Sierżant Konnej Policji 1985
- W Nowej Fundlandii 1988
- Złe miasto 1990
