= Czartoryski Palace (Puławy) =

Coordinates: 51.4122°N 21.9591°E

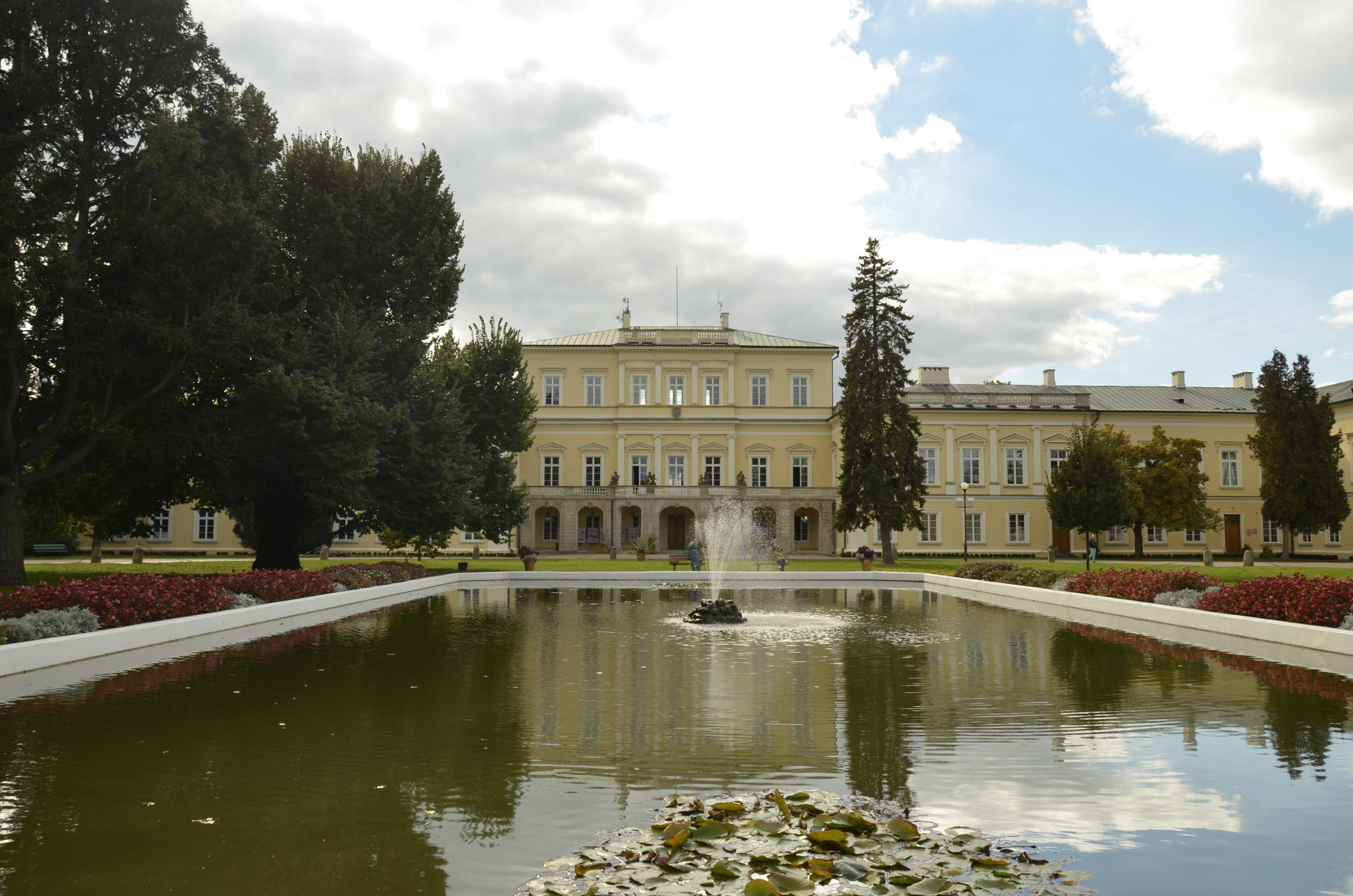
- Front view of the palace
- Interactive map of the Czartoryski Palace area

General information
- Architectural style: Baroque; Rococo
- Location: Puławy, Puławy County, Lublin Voivodeship, Poland
- Construction started: 1671
- Completed: 1679
- Client: Stanisław Herakliusz Lubomirski

Design and construction
- Architects: Tylman van Gameren (original palace); Jan Zygmunt Deybel (new palace); Józef Górecki (reconstruction)

Historic Monument of Poland
- Designated: 2021-05-31
- Reference no.: Dz. U. z 2021 r. poz. 1019

The Czartoryski Palace (Polish: Pałac Czartoryskich) is a palace in the town of Pulawy, Poland, whose origins date back to the second half of the 17th century and are related to the history of the magnate families: the Lubomirski, Sieniawski and, above all, the Czartoryski family.

== History ==
It was first built between 1671 and 1679 by Stanisław Herakliusz Lubomirski to designs by the Dutch architect Tylman van Gameren. This complex included a garden. The town had passed to the Sieniawski family by 1706, when the palace and its surroundings were destroyed by Swedish troops during the Great Northern War. Reconstruction began under Elżbieta Sieniawska in 1722. Soon afterwards Maria Zofia Czartoryska married August Aleksander Czartoryski and between 1731 and 1736 they built a new Rococo palace on the site, to designs by Jan Zygmunt Deybel.

== The Beginnings (17th century) ==
This Baroque semi-defensive palace was first built in Puławy between 1671–1679 by the Grand Marshal of the Crown, Stanisław Herakliusz Lubomirski. The palace was designed by the Dutch architect Tylman van Gameren. The building was rectangular in shape with four alcoves in the corners and was prepared for defensive functions. From this phase of the building, the 17th century Baroque entrance hall with its original colonnade and the form and decor of the vault, has been preserved in a state similar to the original one. The first garden was also created at that time, which is known to have had alleys and regular carpet ground floors below the slope. In 1706, when Pulawy became the property of the Sieniawski family, the Swedish army destroyed the palace and its surroundings during the Great Northern War.

== Reconstruction and extension (1st half of the 18th century) ==
The reconstruction of the palace began in 1722 by Elżbieta Helena Sieniawska. Shortly after Zofia Sieniawska married August Czartoryski on the remains of the burnt down palace, a new palace in the Rococo style was built between 1731–36. Jan Zygmunt Deybel designed the palace, while it was built by Franciszek Mayer. Deybel's project preserved the earlier spatial assumptions. An avenue planted with four rows of trees (later called Królewska Avenue) led to the palace. It crossed in front of the palace entrance with a narrower avenue planted with trees (today's Czartoryskich Street), connecting the Lublin roadway with a winding gorge, the so-called Deep Road. There were (and still are) two courtyards in front of the palace. The front courtyard planted with trees from the side of the entrance was limited by a moat and two guardhouses (still existing today). On its right, farm buildings stretched as far as the Lublin roadway (Piłsudskiego Street). From the front courtyard, through the baroque arcade gate, you enter the courtyard of honour, with a pond in the middle. Single-storey annexes, situated perpendicularly to the palace at the level of the pond, closed the courtyard on two sides. The palace itself has retained the former Tylman framework - a single-storey main body with four alcoves in the corners. The main body had a narrower, three-windowed second floor built up. In order to obtain additional rooms, the alcoves were lengthened parallel to the main axis of the palace and the terrace on the first floor level was removed, combining a significant part of it with the alcoves. A balcony was created on the Vistula side from the rest of the terrace. A two-flight external staircase adjacent to the alcoves, and in the upper section to the main body, led from the courtyard to the representative first floor. The staircase balustrade, the attic over the flat roof of the second floor and the attic surrounding the roofs over the first floor were decorated with sculptures, mostly made by the Hoffmans. The interior and exterior walls of the palace were given rich stucco and ornaments typical of the Rococo style. At the same time, a French-style garden was created near the palace. A gazebo was built in the Lower Garden. The terraces on the slope were covered at the ends with a serpentine staircase. At the level of the palace, behind the left annex, carpeted ground floors and bosquettes were created, behind which was the "Wild Promenade". It was entirely surrounded by a wall and only in places was another fence. The decoration of the second floor on the side avant-corps from the side of backwater and the three central arcades at the main entrance with characteristic sculptures in keystones have survived from that period. The annexes (in the side wings, the central part protruding towards the courtyard) have been preserved - the right-hand side one played the role of an economic annex (formerly it stood separately, today it is connected to the palace), which in the 18th and early 19th century housed the palace kitchen, bakery, etc. On the opposite side, in the same place on the left wing, there was a guesthouse.

== Great times (turn of 18th and 19th century) ==
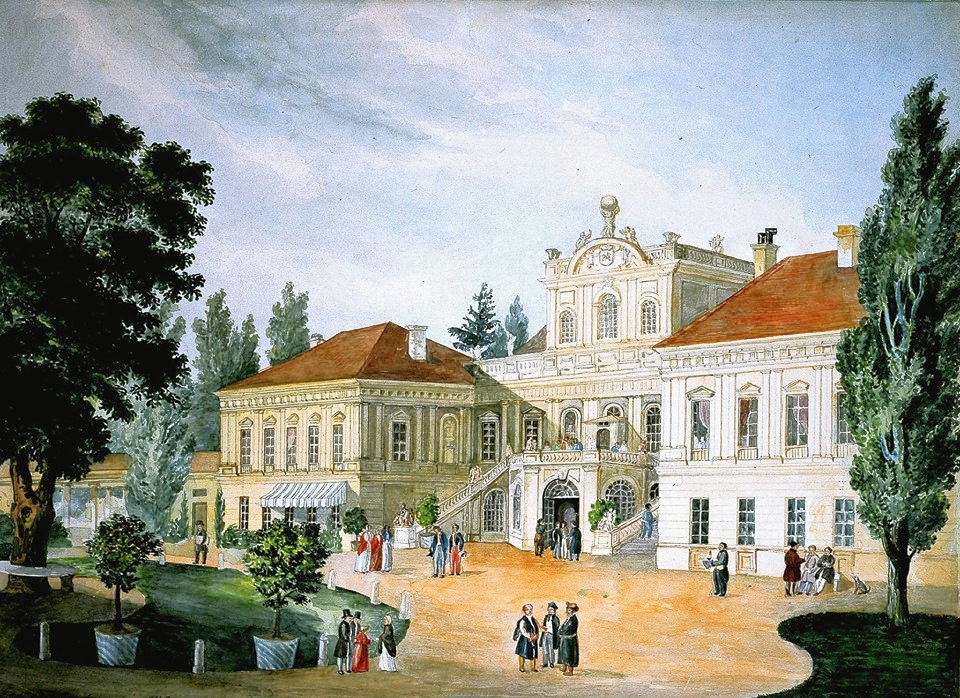
Czartoryski Residence in Puławy by B. Czernow (1842)

The peak of development and functioning of the Enlightenment cultural center in Puławy falls at the turn of the 18th and 19th centuries, thanks to the multilateral activity of Izabela and Adam Kazimierz Czartoryski. A large group of outstanding painters (Jean-Pierre Norblin de La Gourdaine, Zygmunt Vogel, Kazimierz Wojniakowski, Józef Richter), writers (Franciszek Dionizy Kniaźnin, Jan Paweł Woronicz, Julian Ursyn Niemcewicz), architects (Chrystian Piotr Aigner, Joachim Hempel), and musicians (Vincent and Franciszek Lessel), gathered at the Puławy manor house. The heyday of the palace began in 1785, when Prince Adam Kazimierz Czartoryski and his wife Izabella née Fleming moved permanently to Puławy. It was then that the restoration and expansion of the palace began under the direction of Joachim Hempel. In 1794 Puławy was devastated by the Imperial Russian Army. The reconstruction of the palace and the transformation of the park began in 1796, when Christian Piotr Aigner was the main designer of buildings in Puławy. Aigner did not change much of the main body of the palace. He only expanded the alcoves from the courtyard side, widening them to five windows and rebuilt the interior. He also connected the palace with the left annex, building a neo-Gothic one-story orangery with a four-column portico and lions on the park side. The palace was decorated in a classical style. The park with an area of about 30 hectares was rebuilt according to the idea of Princess Izabella, giving it the character of a romantic landscape park in the English style. The park was co-founded by the Englishman James Savage. Attempts were made to take advantage of the natural qualities of the surroundings, e.g. grottos in the slope of the Vistula escarpment and an old tree stand. In the park, where the layout of some alleys has been preserved, many buildings have been built: The Greek House, the Palace of the Virgin Mary, the Temple of the Sybil, the Gothic House, the Yellow House, gazebos, springs, bridges. A rotunda-shaped chapel was erected on the hill near the Lublin roadway, to which an avenue planted with four rows of trees led from the palace. Many trees and shrubs were planted in the form of flower beds, between which paths led and lawns stretched. Among the greenery there are sculptures and various sentences engraved on pedestals, stones and tablets. Attempts were made to add a landscape character to the closer and more distant surroundings, e.g. a Dutch farm (purebred cow farm with mainly decorative character) and a model village with a house of Princess Izabella. In 1801, the Temple of Sibyl opened its doors, the first national museum in Poland, a rich collection of books is collected within the walls of the palace, and scientific works (linguistic, literary, historical) are also financed, in which a large number of scientists were involved. Aristocratic and landed gentry were also educated at the Puławy court. Thanks to these activities, in the 19th century Puławy was referred to as "Polish Athens". Later architects marked the range of the palace with balustrade attics over the five windows of the first floor and three middle windows of the second floor.

== The Fall (1831–1842) ==
The age of the Czartoryski family in Puławy ended in 1831. Prince Adam Jerzy Czartoryski, the owner of Puławy since 1812, was sentenced in absentia to beheading with an axe by the Tsar for his participation in the November Uprising, and all his possessions in the Russian partition were confiscated. Some of the furnishings of the palace and its surroundings were taken to Russia, some of them were auctioned off, e.g. Meissonnier's panelling from the Golden Hall. The collections from the Temple of the Sibyl and the Gothic House as well as the library (about 60,000 volumes) were saved and taken to Paris in stages. (They were later returned to Krakow, where the Czartoryski Museum was established on their basis in 1876). Zofia Zamoyska née Czartoryska took some of the sculptures (including "Tancred and Clorinda", a sarcophagus, lions, an obelisk dedicated to Prince Józef Poniatowski) to Podzamcze near Maciejowice, from where they returned to Puławy in 1947. Many small elements of park architecture disappeared after 1840.

== Time of public institutions (from 1842 to the present day) ==
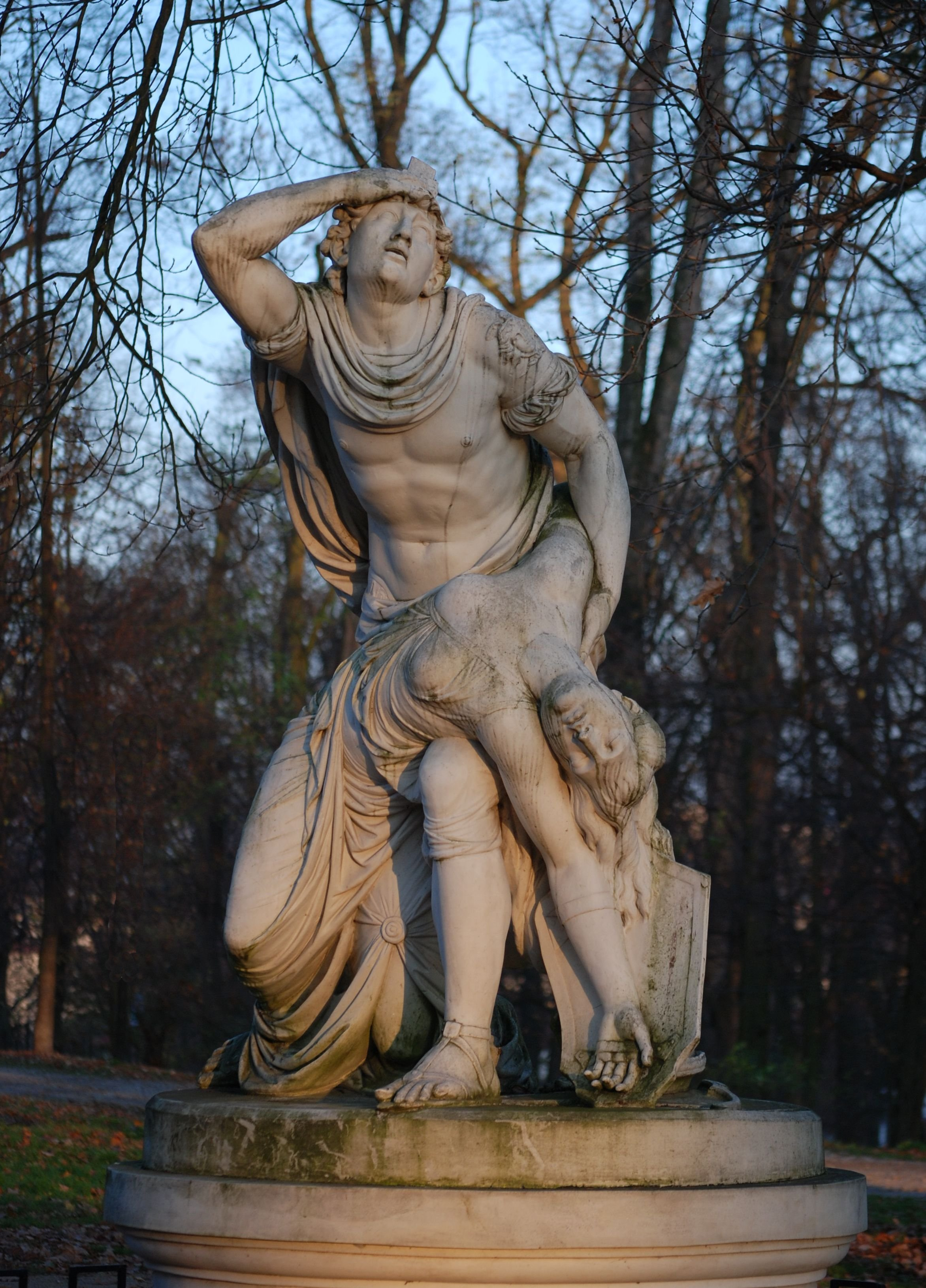
Tancred and Clorinda, a copy of the sculpture in a park of the Czartoryski Palace

In 1842, the palace housed the Institute for the Upbringing of the Ladies, known as the Alexandrian Institute, for whose needs the palace was reconstructed by Józef Górecki in 1840–43. Górecki gave the palace a neoclassical character. One of the most interesting solutions of this architect is the column room in the library, square with 12 Tuscan columns arranged in a circular pattern in the middle. Above it, in the right corner of the first floor, there is a ballroom in the style of Louis Philippe. At that time, the representative external stairs from the courtyard side also disappeared. An internal staircase was created leading to the second floor, expanded by two windows for this purpose. The main body then became two-storey across the entire width. The annexes were connected with the alcoves extended by Aigner, adding one-storey wings bent at a right angle. A building in the shape of an elongated horseshoe was created, with the right wing covering the entire honorary courtyard. Górecki's reconstruction gave the palace the general appearance, which has survived to this day. In 1858 a fire consumed the central part of the palace. It was rebuilt by Julian Ankiewicz. In place of the Golden Hall, he created a Gothic hall as a Catholic chapel, whose construction changed the palace from the side of the backwater. He also gave a new stucco decoration to the stone hall (existing since Czartoryski times), and on the second floor he built an Orthodox chapel (today a knight's hall). He also designed a staircase (in place of the burnt one) made of cast iron, which was a technical sensation in the second half of the 19th century. Since then, the external appearance of the palace has not changed. The old layout of the park has also been preserved.

Other users of the palace and park complex were: the Institute for the Upbringing of Ladies until 1862, the Polytechnic and Agricultural-Forestry Institute in the years 1862–63 (officially until 1869), the Institute of Rural Farming and Forestry until 1914, the State Scientific Institute of Rural Farming until 1950, and now the Institute of Cultivation, Fertilisation and Soil Science - the State Research Institute. New trees were planted by successive users, including many exotic specimens such as Catalpa, Liriodendron and chestnuts. The Czartoryski times are remembered by old oaks and some linden. The park is dominated by linden, maple, hornbeam, poplar, oak and chestnut trees. Beech and larch also grow here. Despite large losses of trees, the park is still one of the most beautiful in Poland and the whole palace and park complex is entered in the register of monuments and sights.

== Memorial plaques ==
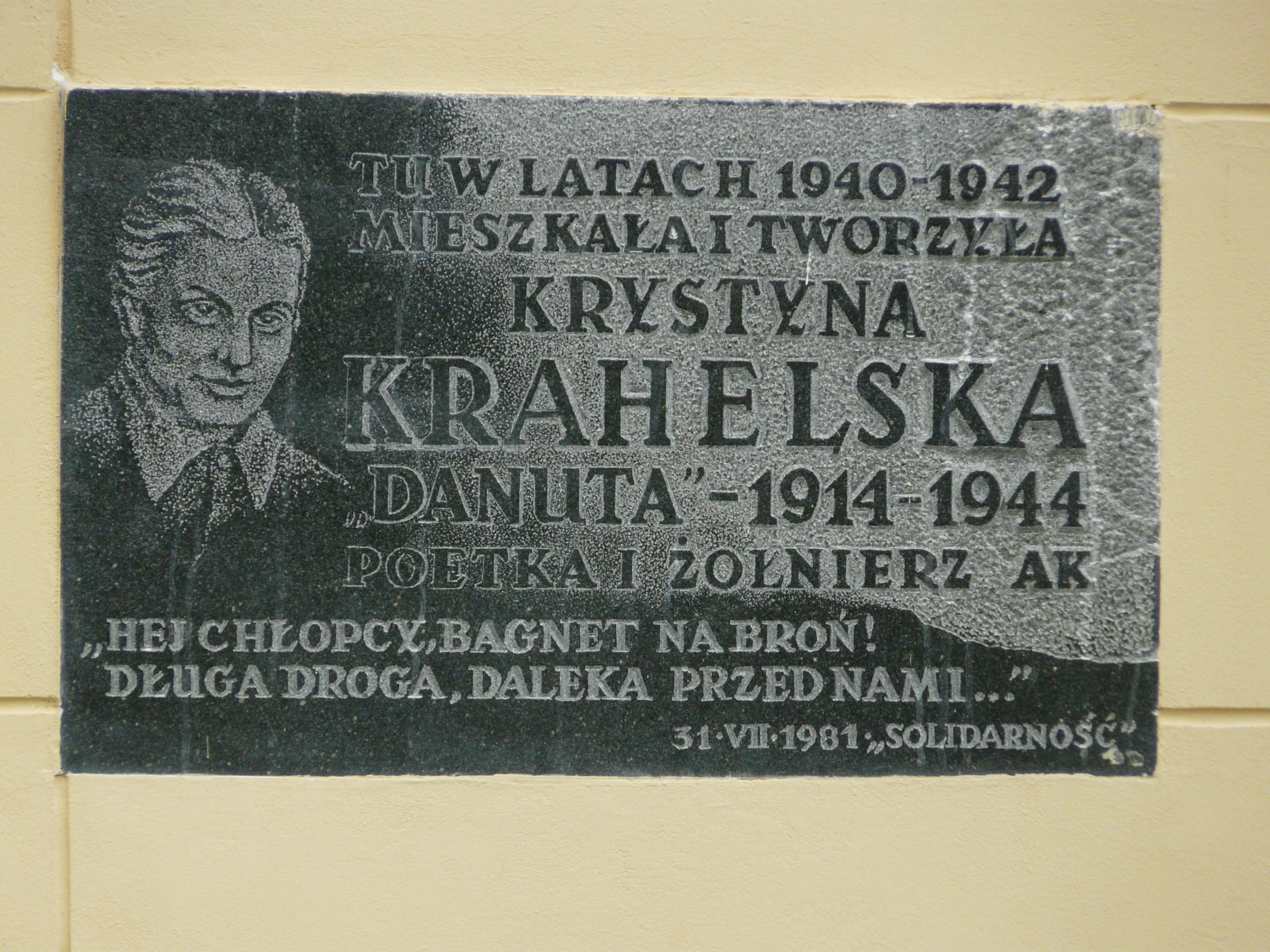
Memorial plaque to Krystyna Krahelska

Currently, on the walls of the palace there are numerous memorial plaques dedicated to distinguished figures from the history of Poland, whose fate is somehow connected with the palace in Puławy. In the façade of the right wing of the palace, there is a stone plaque in memory of Krystyna Krahelska, who in 1940–42 worked as a laboratory assistant in the agricultural microbiology department of the Institute in Puławy. On the left wing of the palace, near the passage to the so-called small park, there is a stone plaque commemorating Józef Piłsudski's stay in Puławy on 12–15 August 1920. In the days preceding the Battle of Warsaw, the Marshal, together with a group of officers, worked out the last plans of the offensive against the Red Army in the column room of the library. A memento of that time is still preserved in the column room, a hexagonal, supported on one leg, grand table at which Piłsudski's staff worked. However, today's plaque is only an exact copy of the original, which was not found after it was probably taken down in 1942 on the order of Governor-General Hans Frank during his visit to the Institute. In the arcades of the portico there is, among others, the oldest of the plaques commemorating Tadeusz Kościuszko, a pupil of the School of Chivalry, which remained under the command of Adam Kazimierz Czartoryski. In the portico arcades there are also plaques dedicated to the Institute's employees murdered during World War II and to student-insurgents from 1863. Many of the plaques are located in the wall of the left wing of the palace. This wall is sometimes called the wall of scientists, because there are plaques here commemorating outstanding scientists working in Puławy. There is also a plaque dedicated to the court poet of Puławy from the Czartoryski era - Franciszek Dionizy Kniaźnin.

== See also ==
- Architecture of Poland
- List of palaces in Poland
