= Tylman van Gameren =

Dutch-Polish architect (1632 – c. 1706)

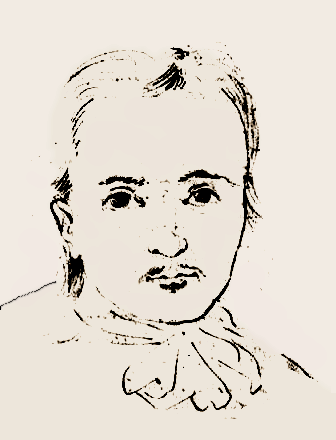
- Self-portrait
- Born: Tylman van Gameren; 3 July 1632; Utrecht, Dutch Republic
- Died: c. 1706 (aged 73–74); Warsaw, Polish-Lithuanian Commonwealth
- Known for: Architecture
- Movement: Baroque

Tylman van Gameren, also Tilman or Tielman and Tylman Gamerski, (3 July 1632 – c. 1706) was a Dutch-born Polish architect and engineer who, at the age of 28, settled in Poland and worked for Queen Marie Casimire, wife of Poland's King John III Sobieski. Tylman left behind a lifelong legacy of buildings that are regarded as gems of Polish Baroque architecture.

== Life and professional career ==
Tylman was born in Utrecht, the Netherlands, and was trained by Jacob van Campen whilst the latter was busy building the Stadhuis on the Dam. Like many Dutch artists at the height of the Dutch Golden Age, Tylman left for Italy in 1650. While in Venice, he earned the reputation as a highly skilled painter of battle scenes. In 1660, Tylman met in Leiden the Polish prince Jerzy Sebastian Lubomirski, the Grand Crown Marshall of the Polish–Lithuanian Commonwealth, and accepted his invitation to come to Poland as his architect and military engineer.

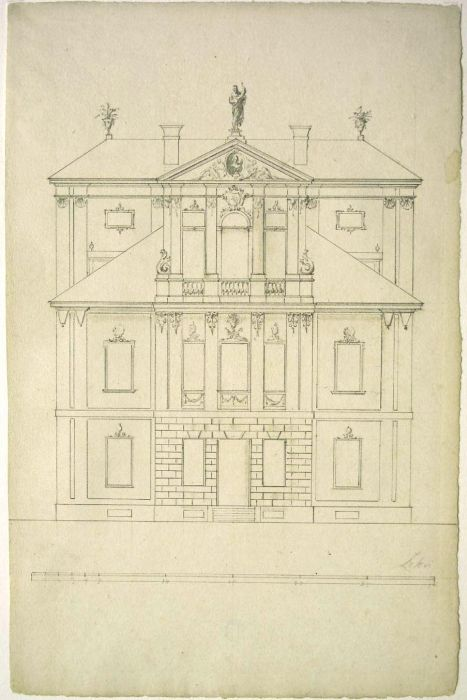
Van Gameren's design of the Kotowski Palace in Warsaw, c. 1682

Once in Warsaw, taking the name of Tylman Gamerski, he soon became a rising star at court. For his first ten years there, he served as an artillery officer, designing fortifications. From 1670 on, he won fame as a court architect of palaces such as the Pałac Czartoryskich, gardens, country houses, monasteries and churches in and around Warsaw, designing (among others) churches of the Holy Ghost, St. Casimir, and St. Boniface. His designs are known as pearls of the Polish baroque and show Italian and Dutch influences. One of the leading examples of his achievements is the Church of St. Anne (Polish: Kolegiata św. Anny) in the historic centre of Kraków, modelled on Sant'Andrea della Valle in Rome. In 1676 the artist was appointed Golden Spur Knight, which allowed him to become a member of the Commonwealth society and marry Anna Komorowska. In 1685 he was formally acknowledge by the Sejm as a Polish nobleman.

Tylman acted as chief architect to Michał Korybut Wiśniowiecki, and John III Sobieski, and his works include the Gniński and Paca-Radziwiłł Palaces. He also completed the Krasiński Palace, begun in 1682 by Giuseppe Bellotti, whose sculptures were executed by Andreas Schlüter. Van Gameren left behind more than 70 grand buildings, a collection of 118 books and some 1,000 drawings.

Most of his sketches, drafts and detailed plans have been preserved and show exceptional artistic quality, though 200 of them were lost in World War II. A unique on the European scale archive of Tylman van Gameren's work, at the University of Warsaw Library, include over 800 original design drawings of ecclesiastical buildings (including the Sisters of the Holy Sacrament Church and the Bernardine Church in Czerniaków district), epitaphs, tombstones, palaces (i.e. Krasiński Palace), villas, manor houses, public service buildings and fortifications.

Tylman Gamerski died in Warsaw in 1706 and was buried in the Dominican Church on Cracow Foretown Street (unfortunately the church was pulled down in 1818 to build the Staszic Palace).

== Works ==
Aristocratic palaces
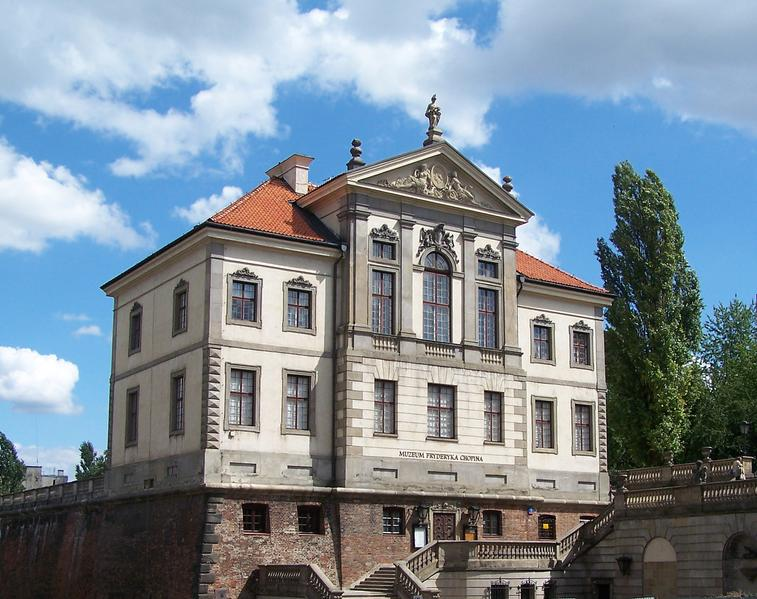
Ostrogski Castle in Warsaw, after 1681

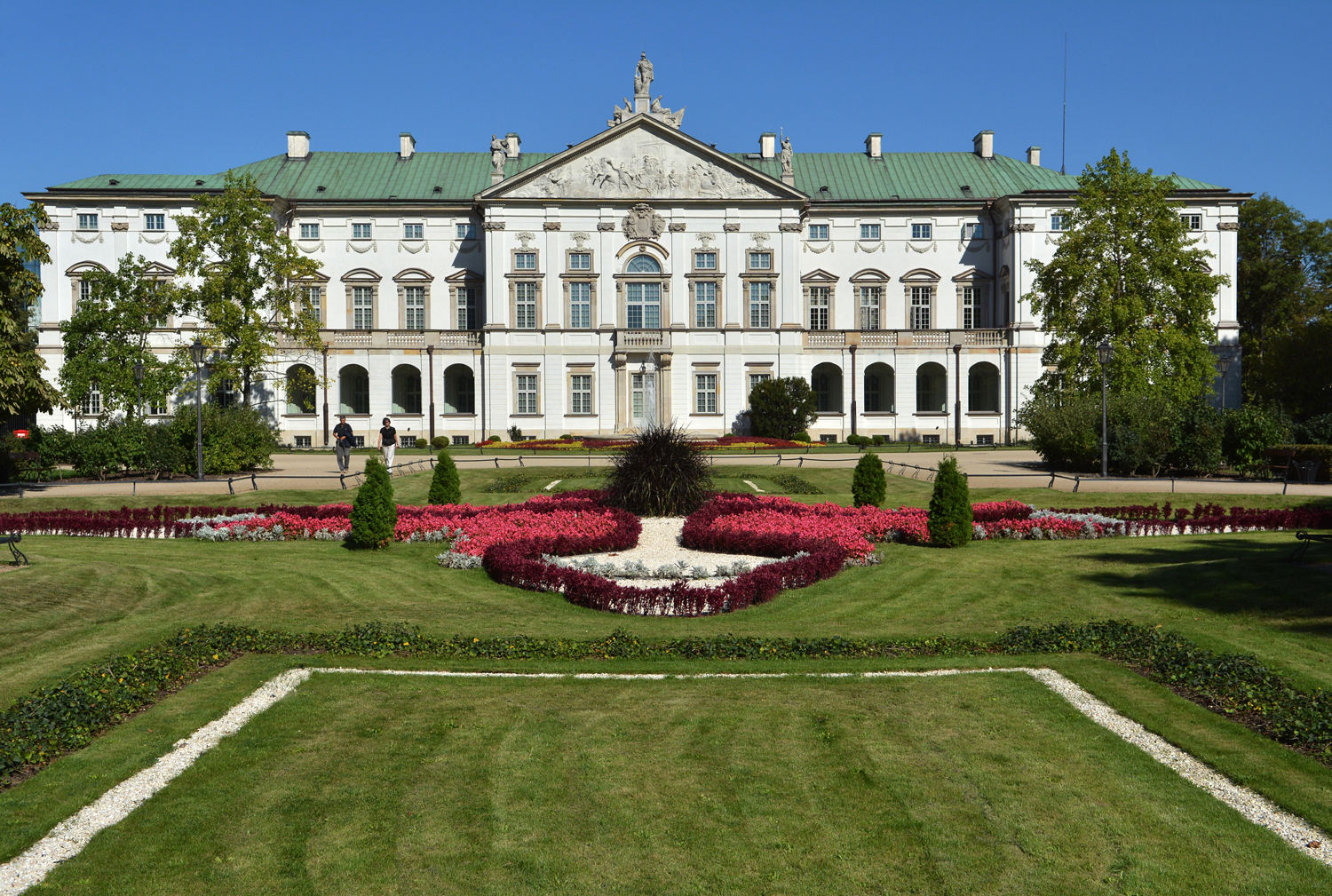
Krasiński Palace in Warsaw, after 1677

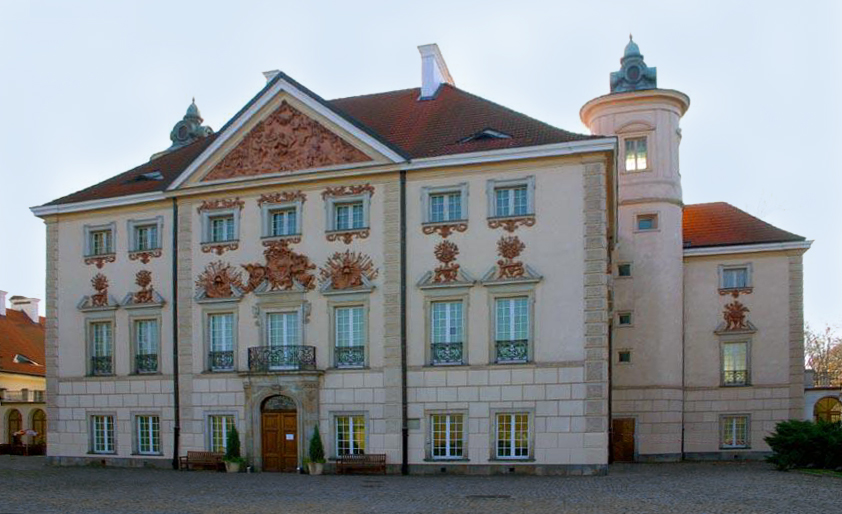
Bieliński Palace in Otwock Wielki, built 1682–1689

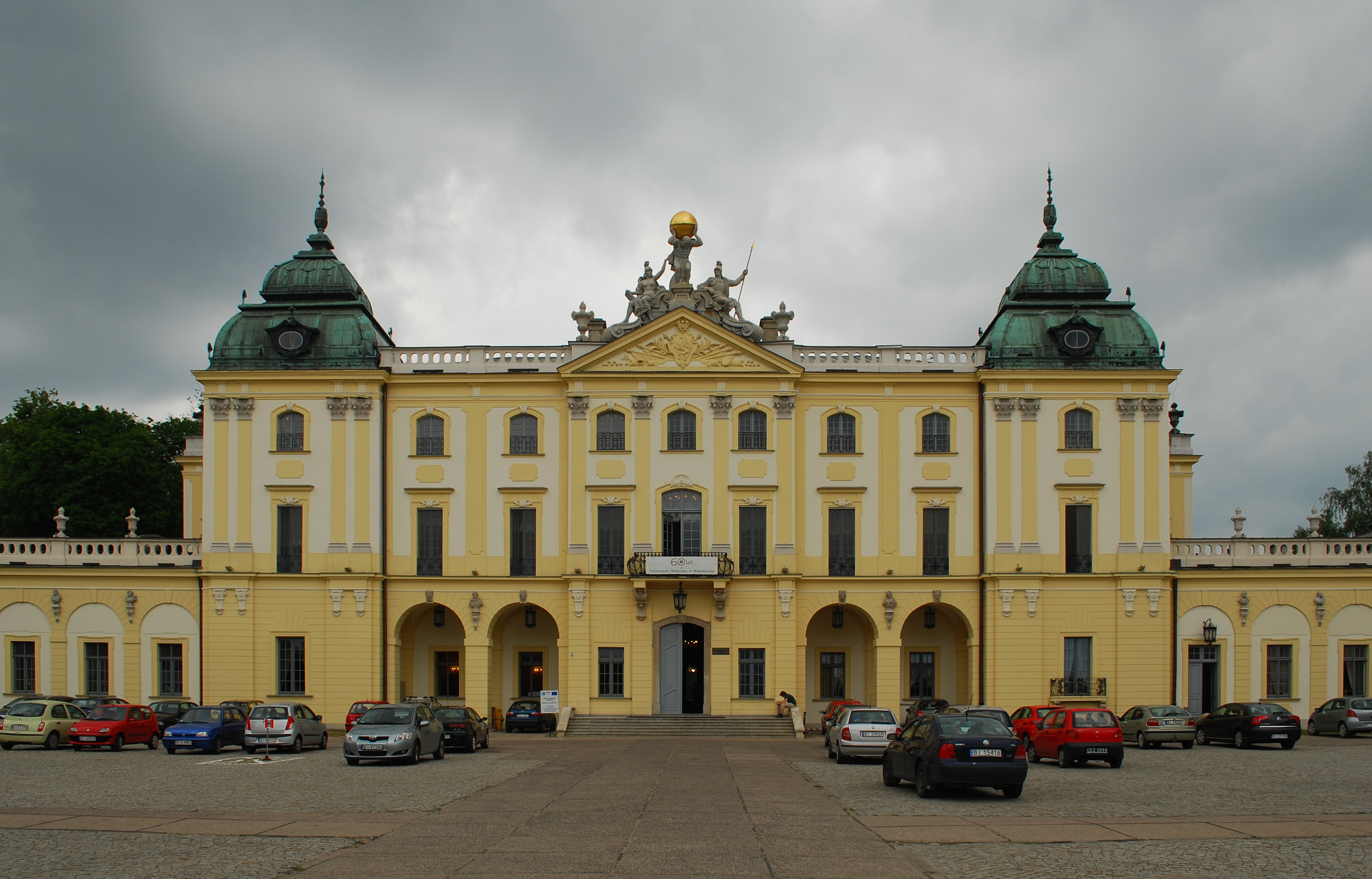
Branicki Palace in Białystok, built 1691–1697

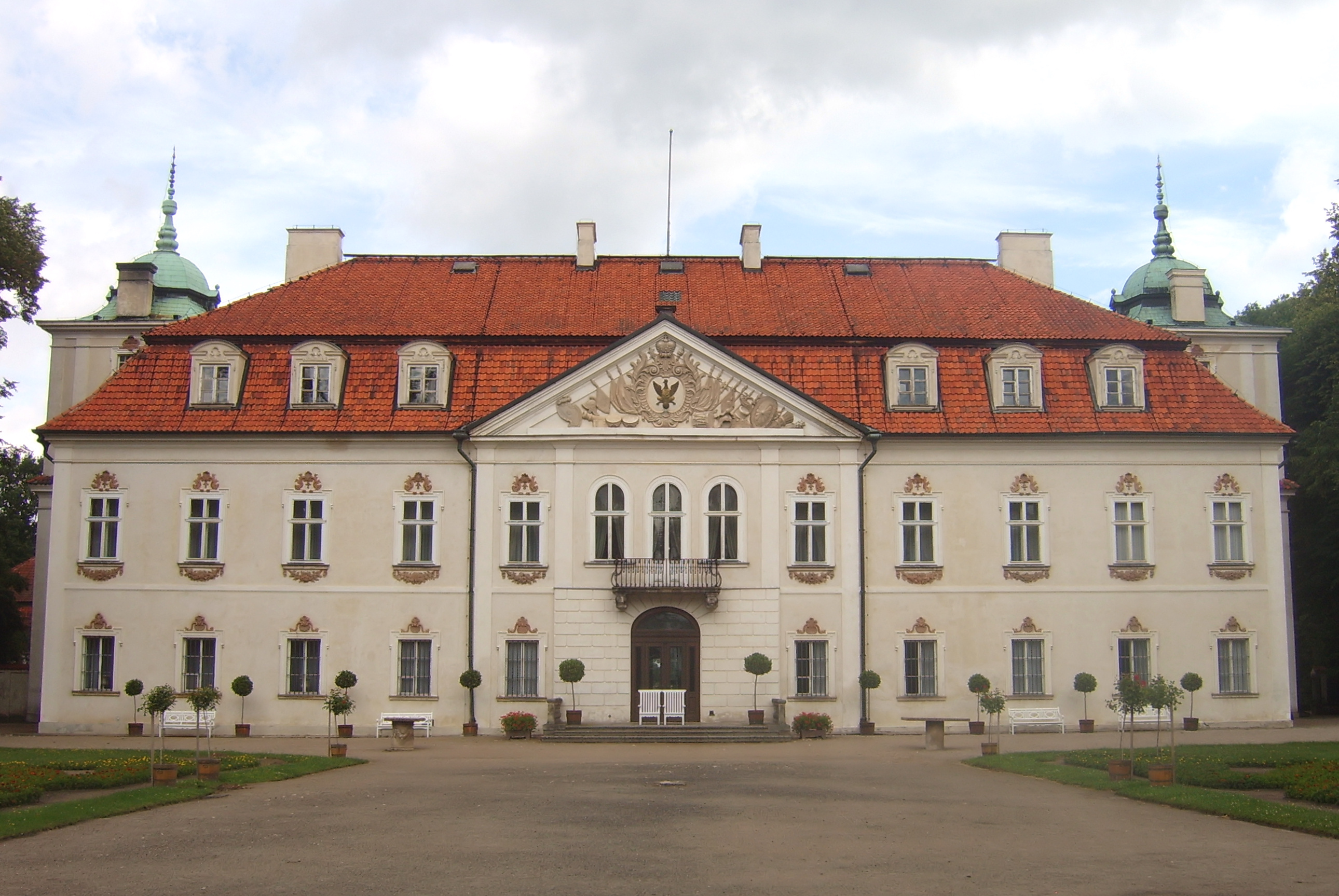
Radziejowski Palace in Nieborów, built 1694
Churches and other projects
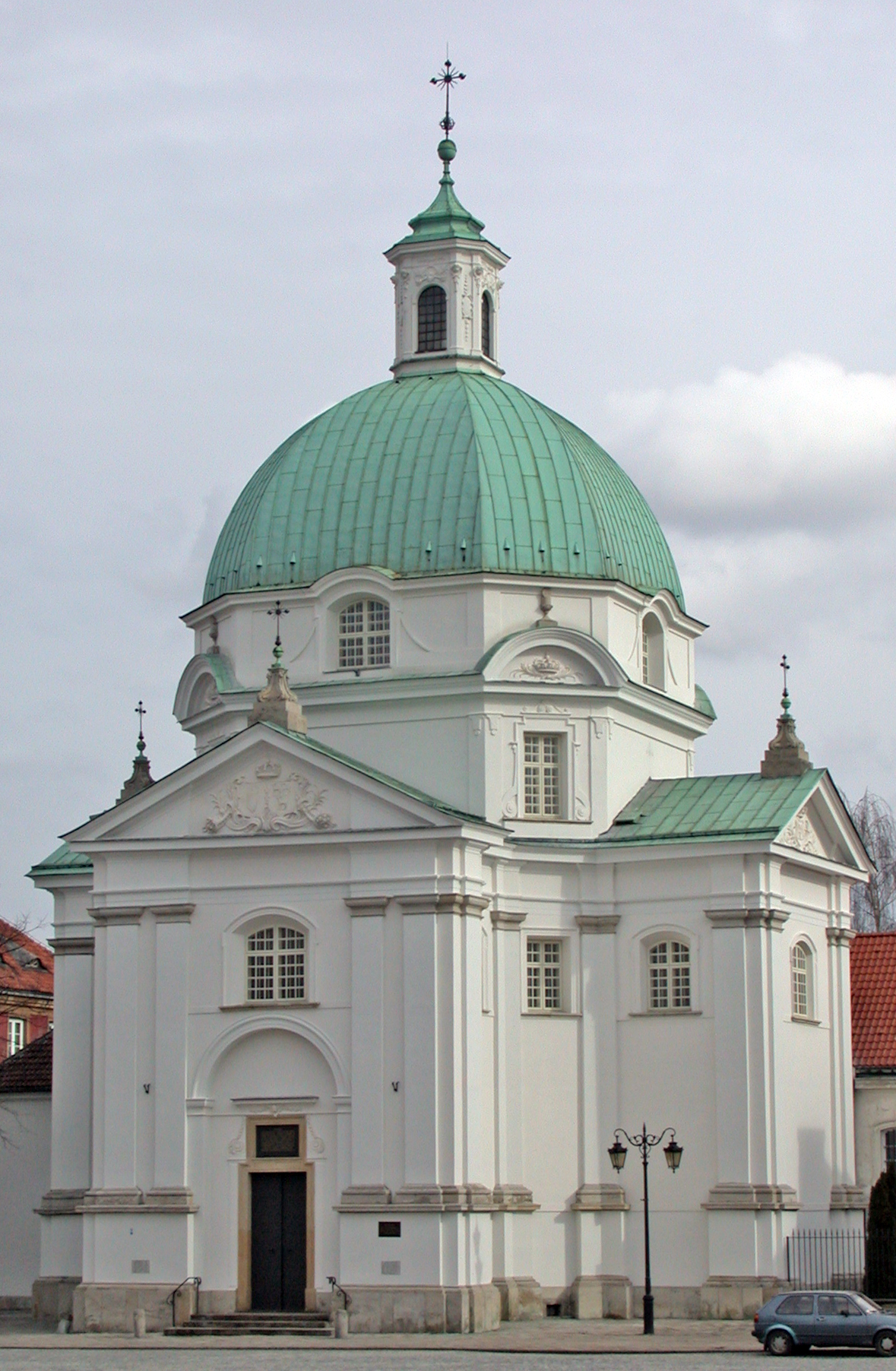
St. Kazimierz Church in Warsaw, built 1688–1692

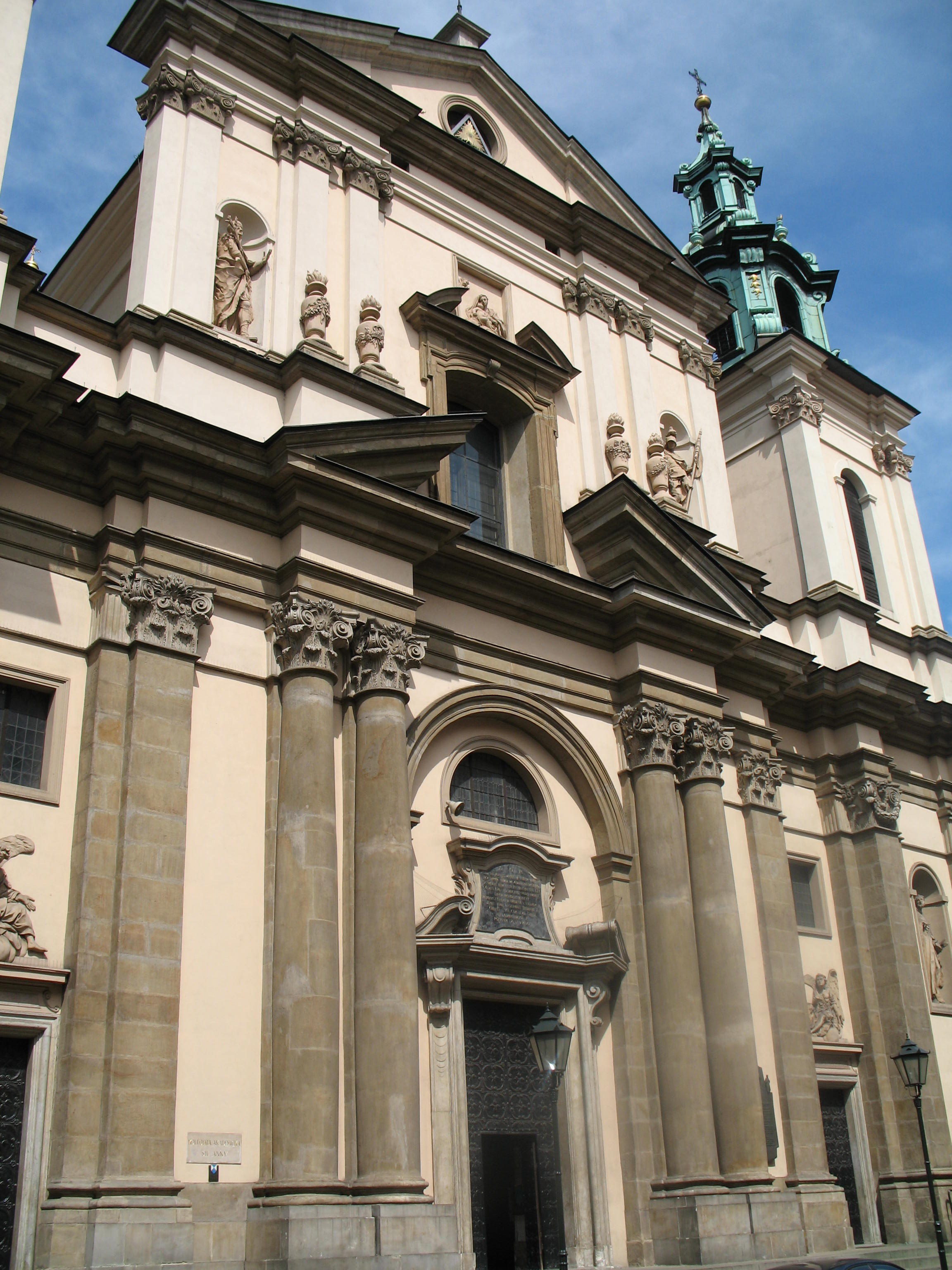
St. Anne's Church in Kraków, rebuilt 1689–1703

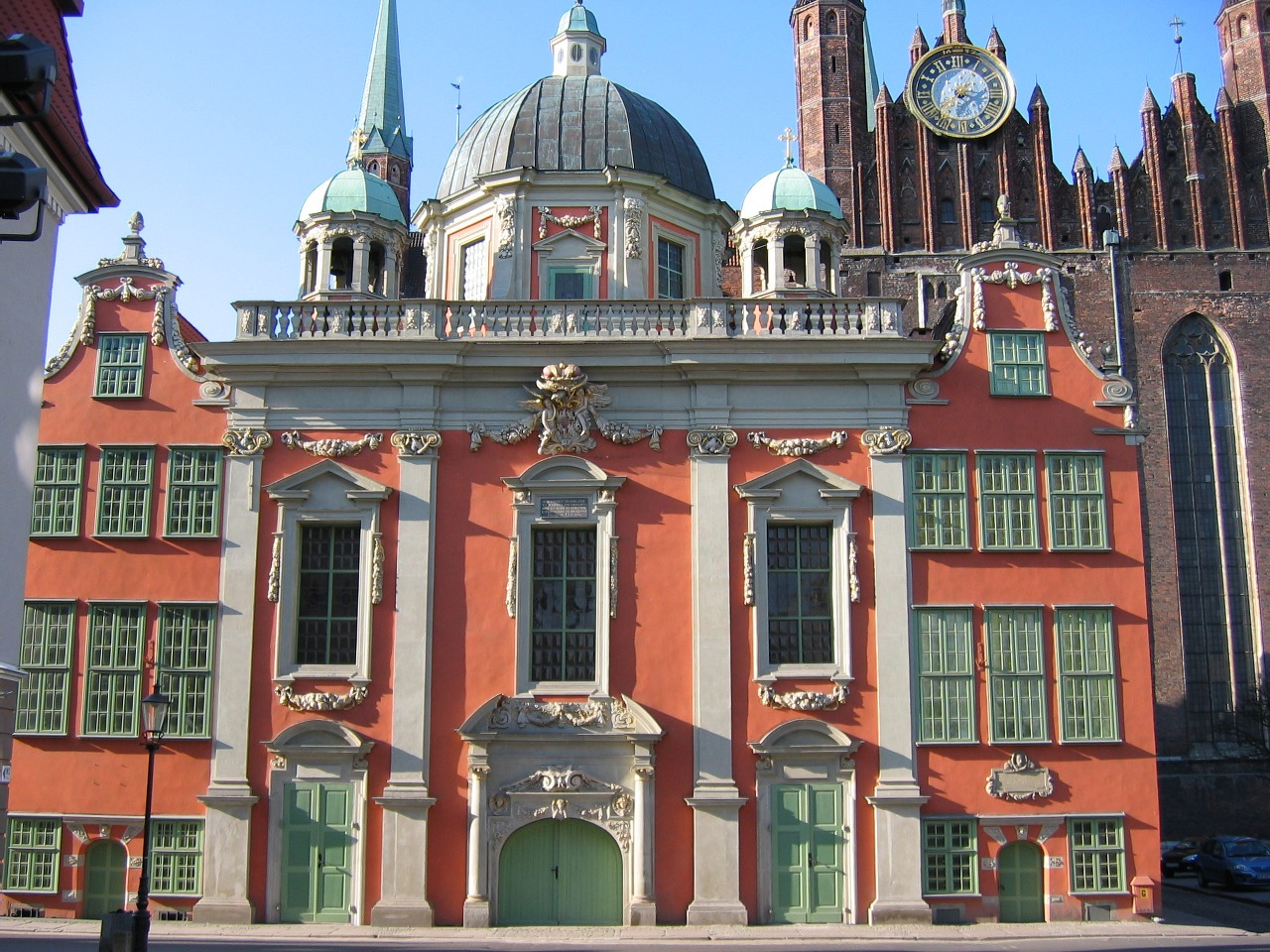
Sobieski Royal Chapel in Gdańsk, built 1678–1681

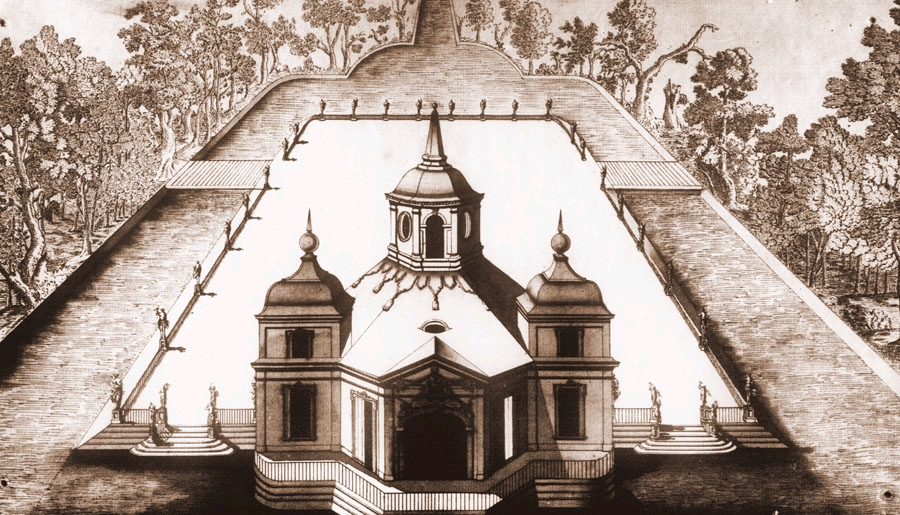
Lubomirski bathing pavilion, built 1683–1689

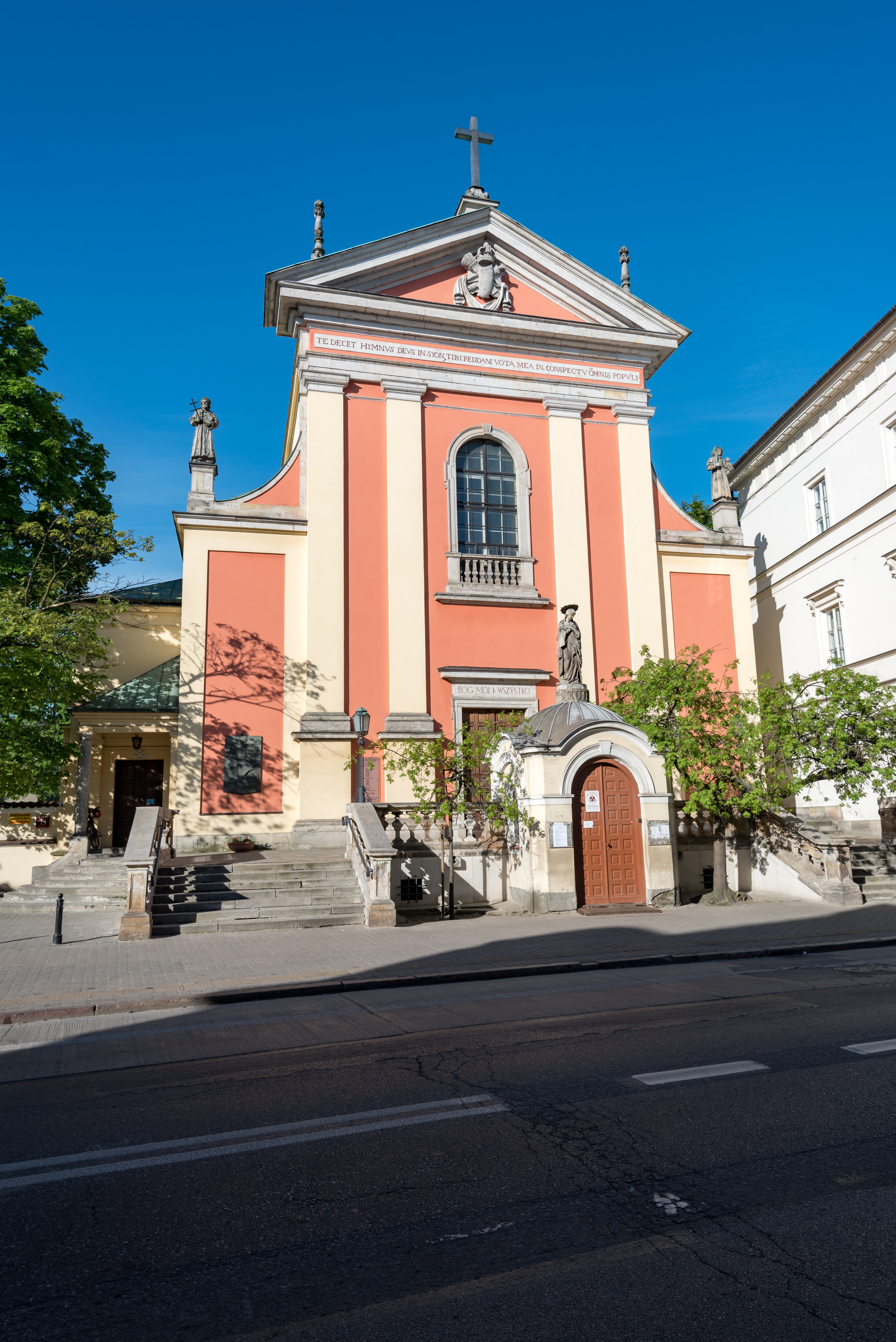
Capuchin Church, Warsaw

== See also ==
- Ujazdów Castle
- Mariemont Palace

== Literature ==
- Stanisław Mossakowski, Tilman van Gameren: Leben und Werk, Deutscher Kunstverlag, München 1994, XIII, 366 S., ISBN 3-422-06097-9
- Ottenheym, K. A., & Goossens, E. J. H. P. (2002). "De Nederlandse jaren van Tilman van Gameren. Bronnen van inspiratie en scholing". In: E. J. Goossens & K. A. Ottenheym (eds.), Tilman van Gameren. Een Nederlandse architect aan het hof in Polen (pp. 24–39). Amsterdam: Stichting Koninklijk Paleis Amsterdam.
