= Marymont Palace =

Former Summer Manor near Warsaw, Poland

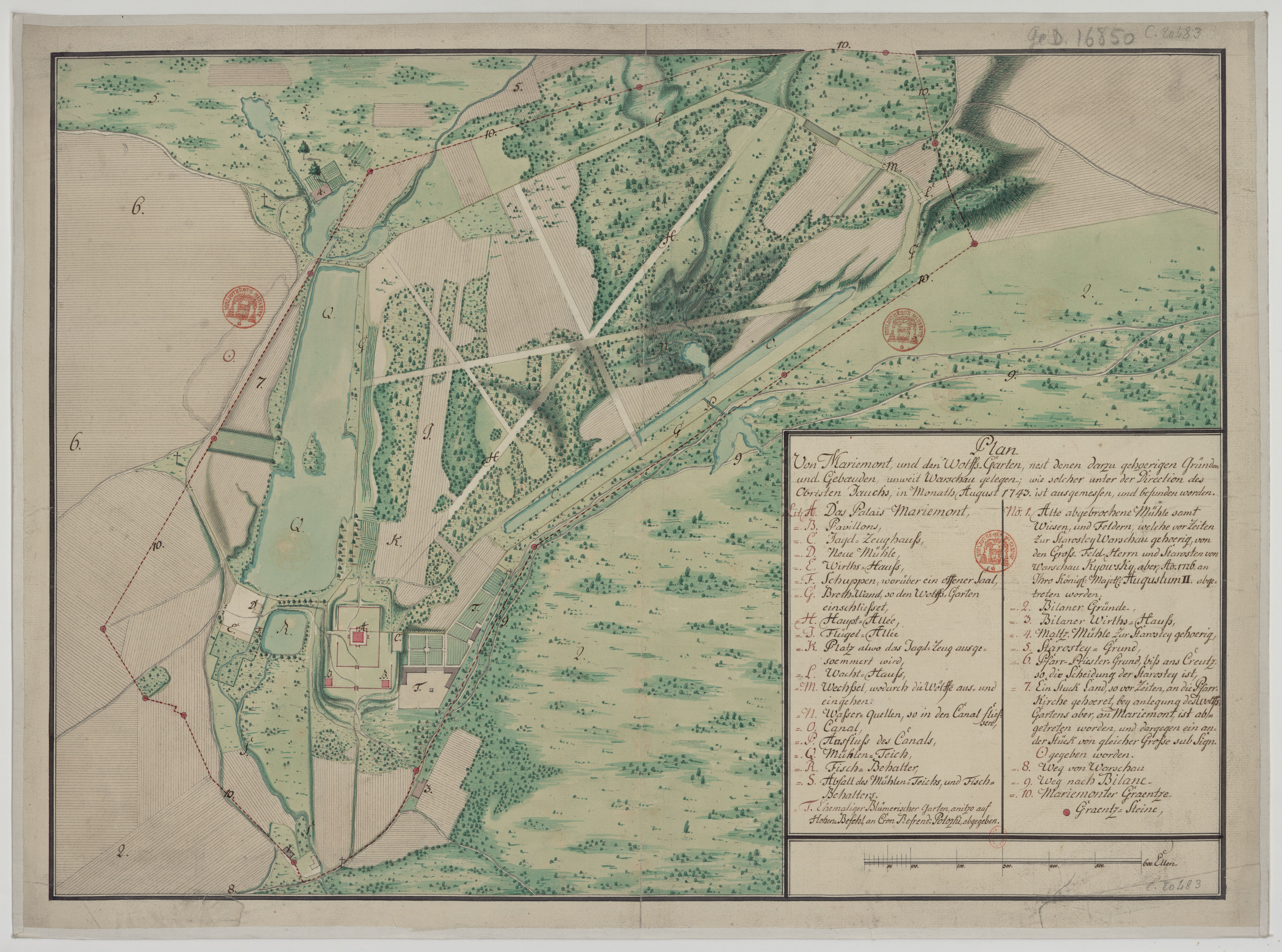
Plan of Mariemont palace in 1743

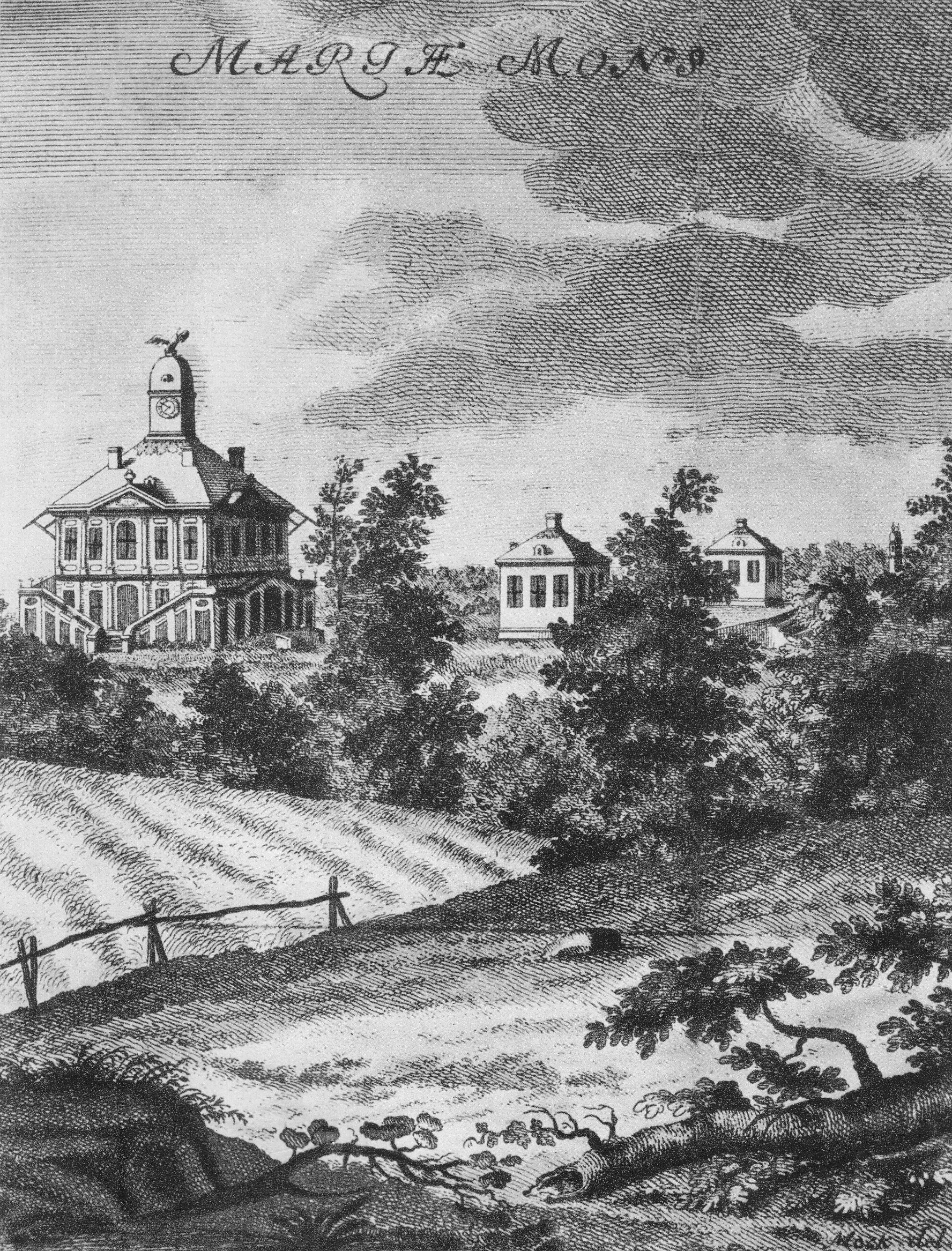
Mariemont palace in the time of the Sobieskis

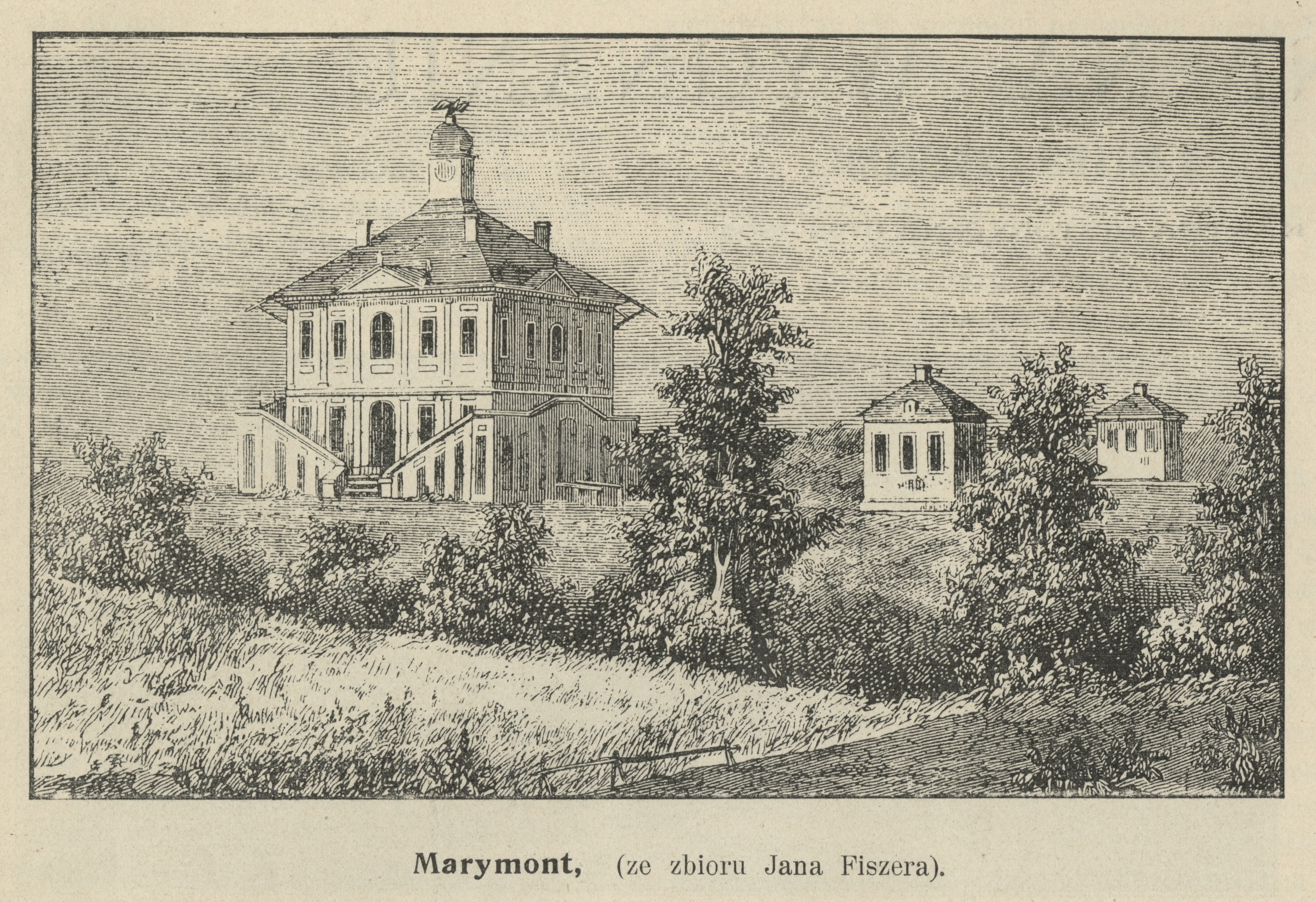
Mariemont palace on a 19th-century engraving

Mariemont Palace was a small summer palace of the kings of Poland. It was located in Marymont, a northern neighbourhood of Warsaw, Poland. Today, nothing remains of this pleasure pavilion, and a church stands on its location.

== History ==
At the behest of king John III Sobieski, a palace was constructed between 1691 and 1696 for his wife, queen Marie Casimire. The design was made by the Dutch architect Tylman van Gameren . The palace was named ‘Mariemont’ after the queen, meaning Mary’s hill.

It was a charming, compact building intended to be used as a pleasure pavilion for summer times and basis to go hunting. It was located on a lofty embankment along the Vistula river. The main structure featured multiple floors and had a square layout, crowned with an elegant tented roof and an intricately designed onion dome. The first floor, known as the "piano nobile," served as the noble living space. The palace's facades were uniformly adorned with frames and decorative pilasters, creating a harmonious aesthetic.

In 1727, the Sobieski family sold the palace to king Augustus II the Strong of Poland, who was also Elector of Saxony. He undertook extensive renovations and established a menagerie. The architect Joseph Christoph Naumann helped in the design of the renovations. Various plans can still be found in the Saxon State main archive in Dresden.

Both August II and his son, king Augustus III of Poland, regularly used Mariemont as a hunting lodge for trips into the Bielański forest and the Kampinos forest. The hunting trips could take up to two days with more than five thousand participants. In a hunting trip at Mariemont in 1724 around 700 aristocrats participated, around 200 hunters, and 4,000 peasants who helped as drivers). When Stanisław August Poniatowski became King of Poland in 1764, Mariemont palace remained in the possession of the Saxon Electors. They leased the palace out to various users, such as the English ambassador. After the Third Partition of Poland in 1795, they sold all their possessions to Prussia.

In 1816, an agronomic institute was established in the grounds of the palace. After the January Uprising in 1863 and 1864, the palace and the institute were transferred to the Imperial Russian Army to be used as cavalry barracks. In the palace a military warehouse was set up, and its architecture was damaged. Today, nothing remains anymore of the palace. On its foundations, a Catholic church has been constructed. During renovation works in 2016, archaeological research has been performed.

== Literature ==
- Hentschel, Walter (1967). Die Sächsische Baukunst des 18. Jahrhunderts in Poln (in German). Berlin: Hentschel Verlag. pp. 182–189.
- Grabowski, Michal; Mieszkowski, Radoslaw (2016). "Badania „Wzgórza Marii", czyli odkrycie reliktów pałacu Sobieskich na Marymoncie w Warszawie". Metody geofizyczne w archeologii polskiej 2016 (PDF) (in Polish). pp. 29–30.

== See also ==
- Marywil
