= Uruski Palace =

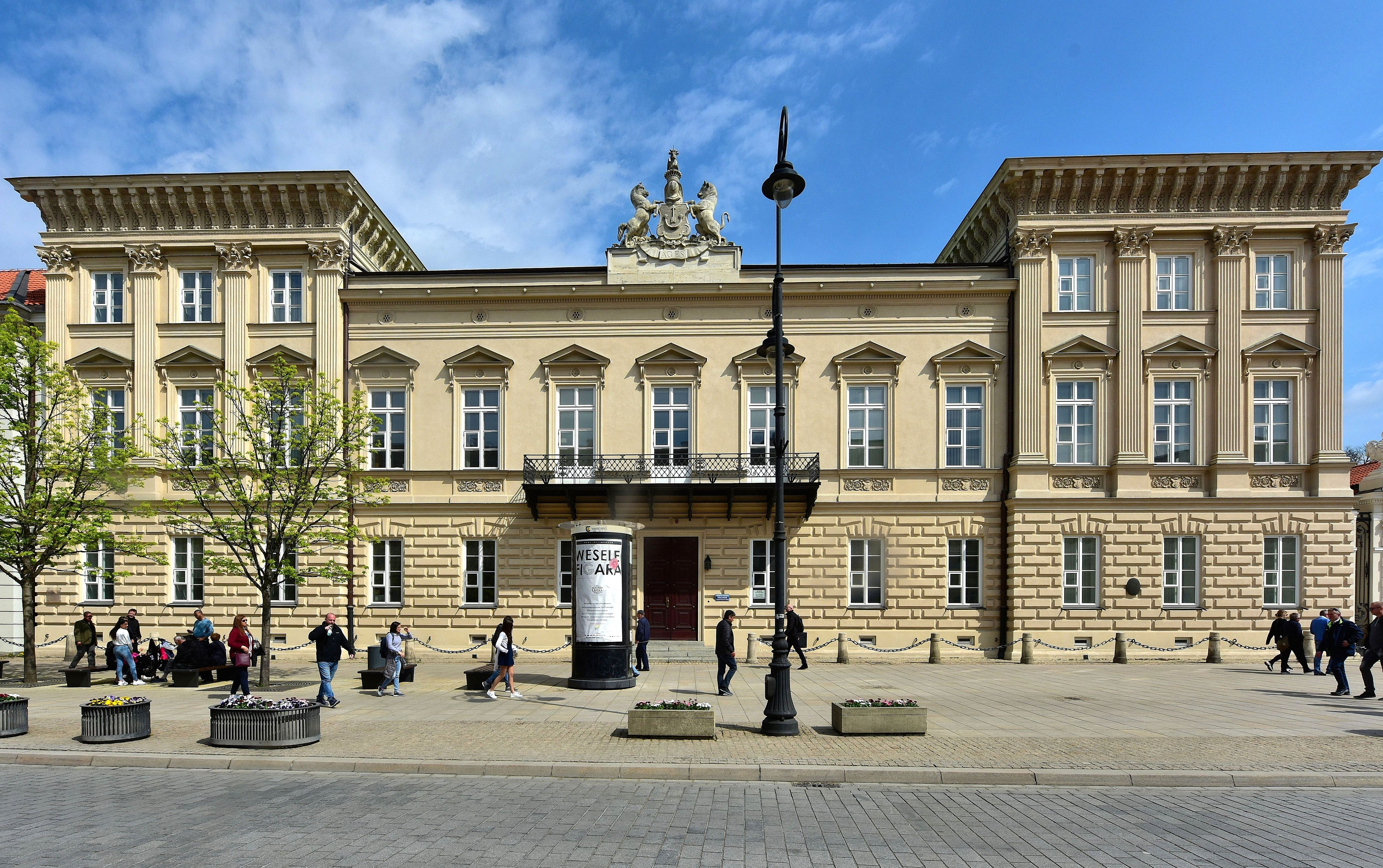
- Uruski Palace

- Location of Uruski Palace in Poland
- 52°14′24″N 21°01′01″E
- Location: Warsaw, Masovian Voivodeship; in Poland

History
- Built: 1847
- Demolished: 1944
- Rebuilt: 1948-1951

Site notes
- Architectural style: Renaissance

Historic Monument of Poland
- Designated: 1994-09-08
- Part of: Warsaw – historic city center with the Royal Route and Wilanów
- Reference no.: M.P. 1994 nr 50 poz. 423

The Uruski Palace (Polish: Pałac Uruskich) is a historical building located on Krakowskie Przedmieście in Warsaw, Poland.

== History ==
Formerly, on the site of the present palace stood a Baroque palace built at the turn of the 1830s and 1840s, attributed to the architect Jan Zygmunt Deybel, a castellan of Kraków under Stanisław Poniatowski, father of King Stanisław August Poniatowski. It was here that Stanisław August learned he had been elected king of the Polish–Lithuanian Commonwealth. The palace changed hands several times; in 1843 it became the property of Seweryn Uruski, marshal of the nobility of the Warsaw governorate, a privy counselor, and mayor of the Imperial Court. Uruski chose to demolish the palace to make way for a new building.

The project was commissioned by architect Andrzej Gołoński, who gave the new building its Renaissance architectural style. The construction work lasted from 1844 to 1847. In the years 1893-1895 the palace was renovated under the direction of Józef Huss, who built a new outhouse to its north. The palace was burned down during the Warsaw Uprising. After 1947, the palace became property of the University of Warsaw. The rebuilt palace (1948-1951) was modified, namely without an entrance gate to its north. Presently, the palace houses the Faculty of Geography and Regional Studies of the University of Warsaw.

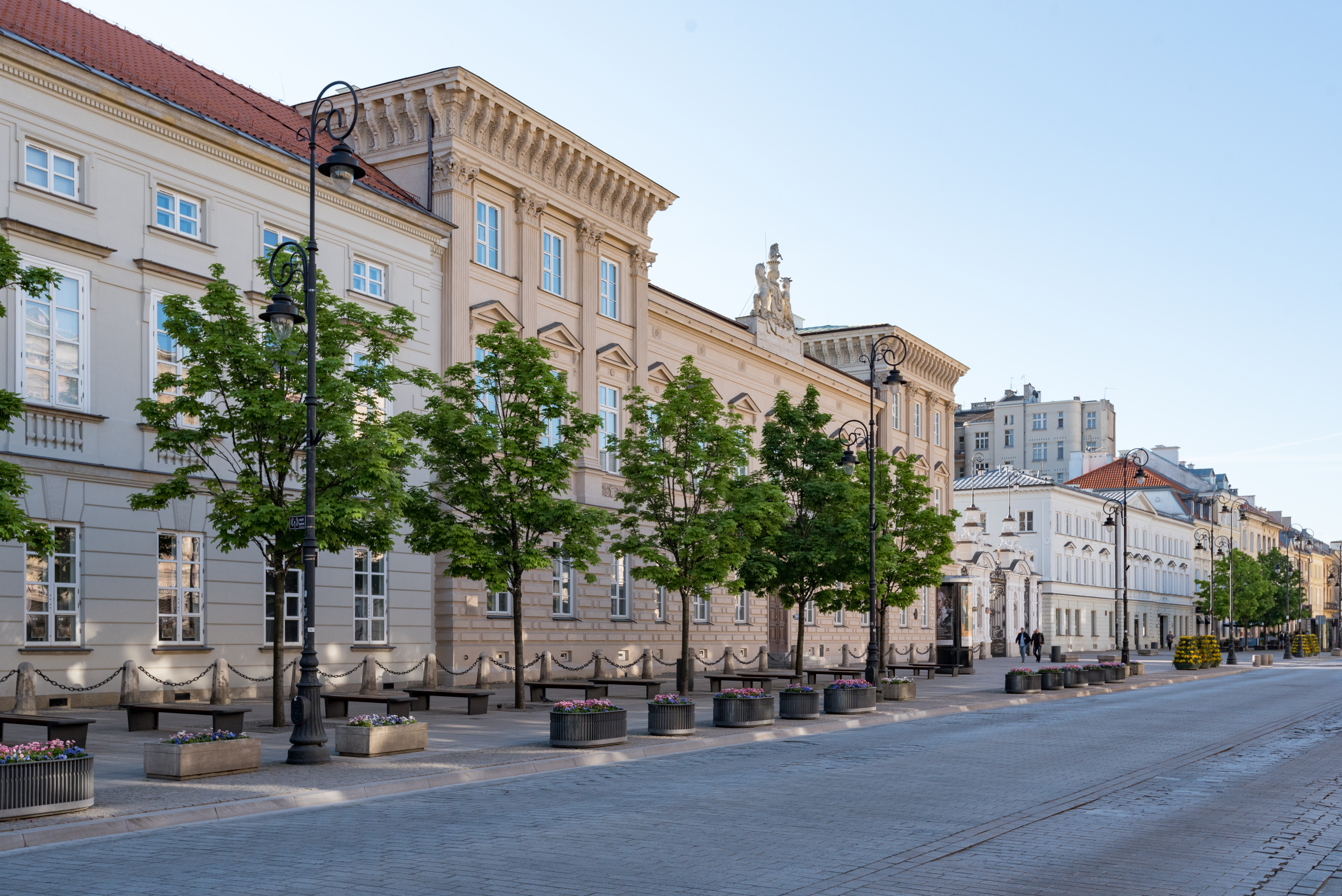
Uruski Palace viewed from Krakowskie Przedmieście

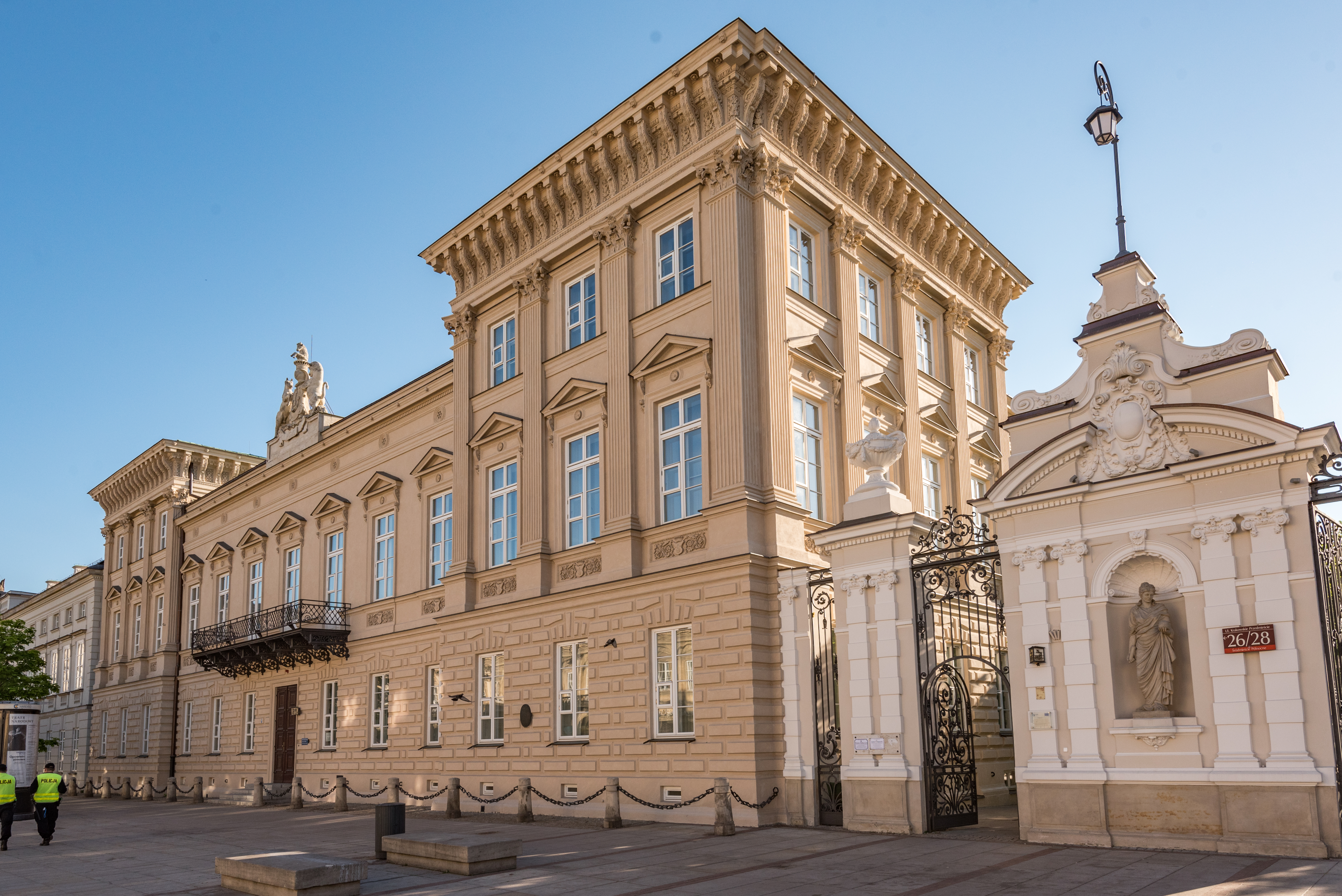
Uruski Palace and the University of Warsaw Gatehouse

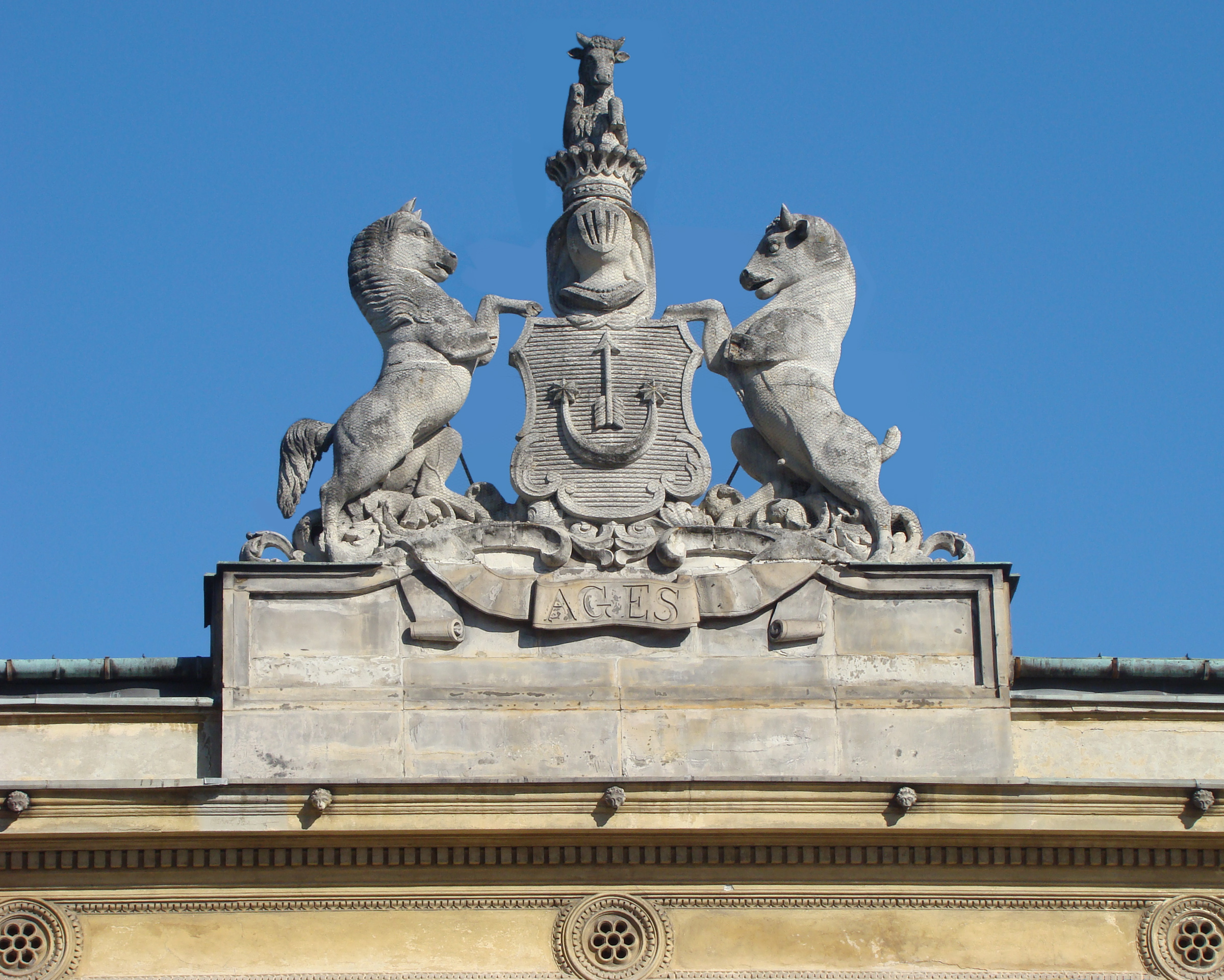
Cartouche on top of Uruski Palace
