= Krystian Godfryd Deybel de Hammerau =

Polish general

Krystian Godfryd Deybel de Hammerau (1725–1798) was a Polish military commander and a general of artillery. He fought during the Warsaw Uprising of 1794 and commanded the artillery of Kościuszko's Uprising.

He was born to a family of Polonized German aristocracy of Saxon origin. His father was Jan Zygmunt Deybel (ca. 1695-1752), a major in the artillery and a noted architect, and his mother was Jan's first wife, Anna Dorota née Neyman. Deybel joined the Royal Cadet Corps in 1740. In 1750 he was sent to Dresden, where he studied artillery tactics. Upon his return to Poland in 1753 he joined the Royal Artillery and served with distinction at various posts, rising to the rank of pułkownik and ennobled in 1786.

During the Warsaw Uprising, Deybel was the commanding officer of the Warsaw Arsenal and was responsible for aiding the Polish forces expelling the Russian occupation force from the city. For his actions, he was promoted to the rank of Major General on May 18, 1794. Although over 70 at that point, he remained in the Polish Army until the end of hostilities. He died in Warsaw on October 8, 1798.

He married Zofia Elizabeth née Rex (1738-1794), and Anna Maria née Desmett. From his second marriage he had a son, Henryk Aleksander (1795-1850).
