= Gothic House (Puławy) =

Coordinates: 51.4113°N 21.9630°E

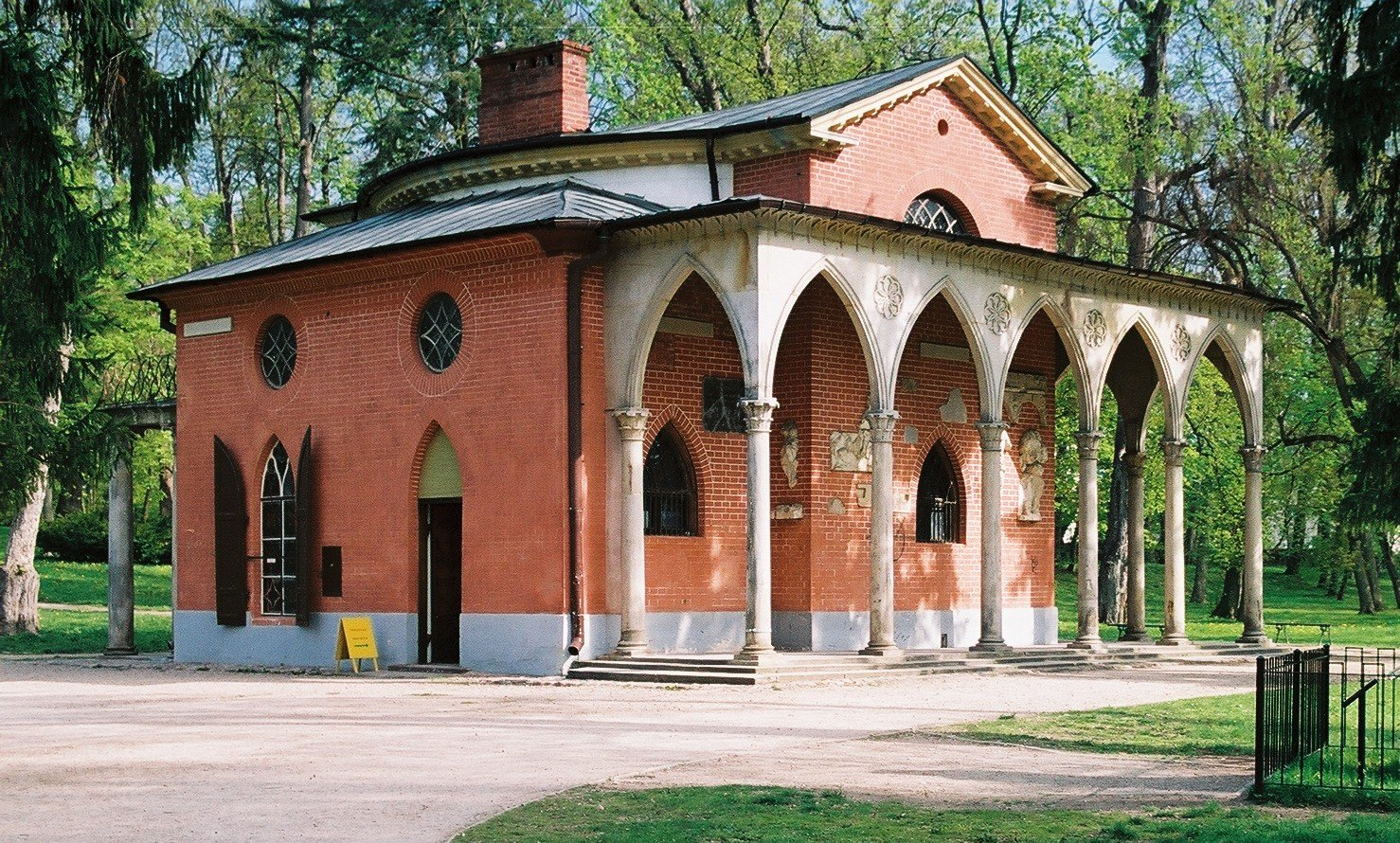
The Dom Gotycki.

The Gothic House (Polish: Dom Gotycki) or Domek Gotycki ("Little Gothic House") is a small neo-Gothic garden pavilion in Pulawy, Poland, forming part of the palace and park of the Pałac Czartoryskich.

It was built between 1801 and 1809 to designs by Chrystian Piotr Aigner on the foundations of a Baroque garden pavilion which had been destroyed by Russian troops in 1794. Its masonry was partly new but partly also reused pieces of stone from historic buildings and sites in Italy, Spain and Poland collected by Izabela Czartoryska for her lapidarium. It was designed to expand the display space in the nearby Temple of the Sibyl, displaying items on the exterior as well as the interior.

After the failure of the November Uprising in 1831 and the Russian confiscation of the Czartoryska family art collections, most of the stones embedded in the walls were removed or destroyed by the Russians. In 1869 Dmitry Tolstoy, Russian Minister of Education, instructed that all Polish cultural goods be removed.
