= Jan Zygmunt Deybel =

German architect

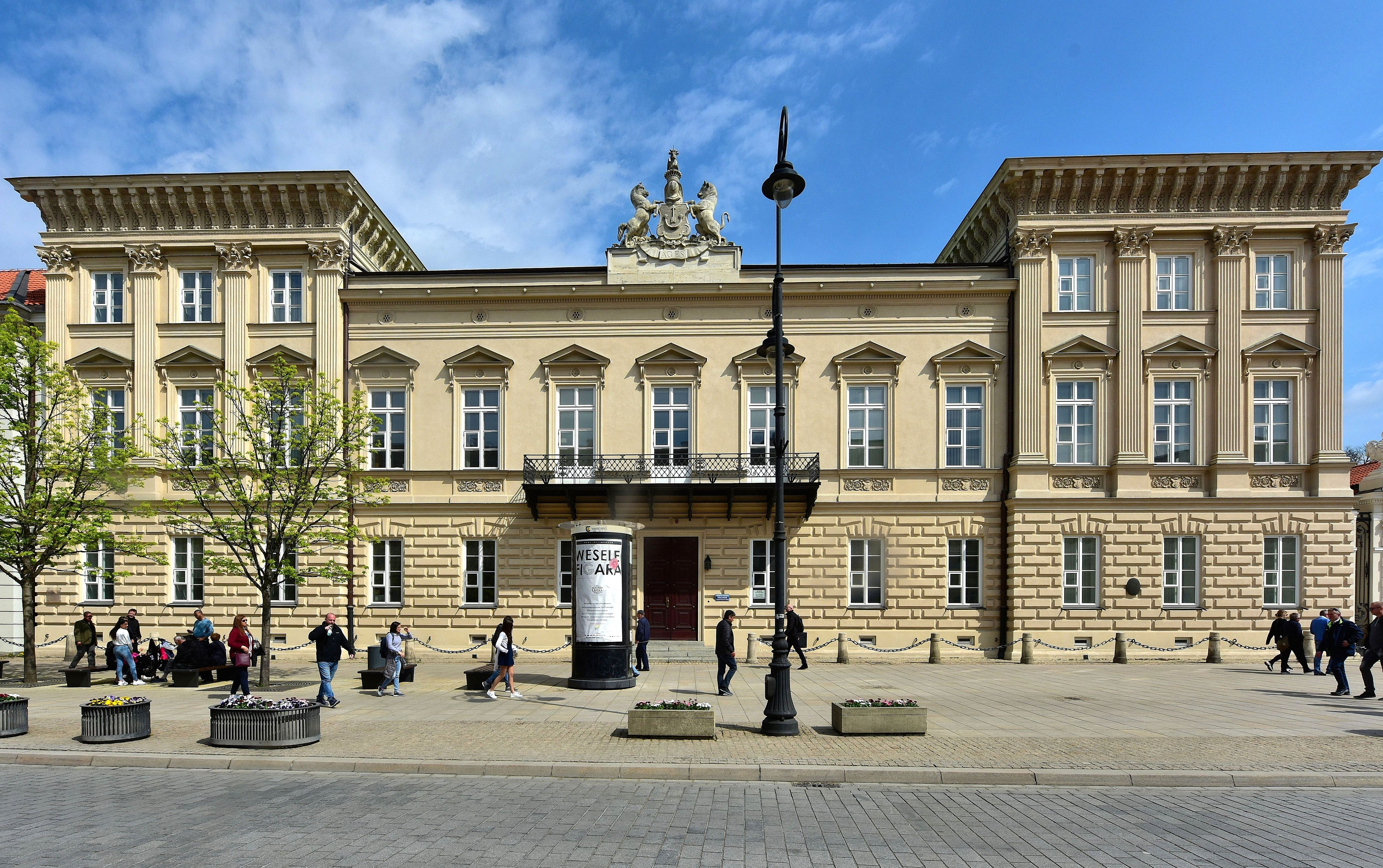
Uruski Palace in Warsaw, by Jan Zygmunt Deybel

Jan Zygmunt Deybel von Hammerau or Johann Sigmund Deybel (1685-90 in the Electorate of Saxony – 1752) was a Rococo architect from thr Electorate of Saxony mainly active in Poland. He also served as a captain (from 1736) then as a major (1746) in the Polish artillery — his son was the general Krystian Godfryd Deybel de Hammerau.

== Life ==
From 1719 to 1721 he worked in Warsaw's royal buildings office and from 1726 was architect to Augustus II the Strong. He used French architectural forms from the three-volume 1727-37 L'Architecture française by J. Mariette. His pupils included Ephraim Szreger and Zygmunt Vogel.
