= South Downtown, Warsaw =

Neighbourhood in Warsaw, Poland

South Downtown
- City Information System area (neighbourhood)
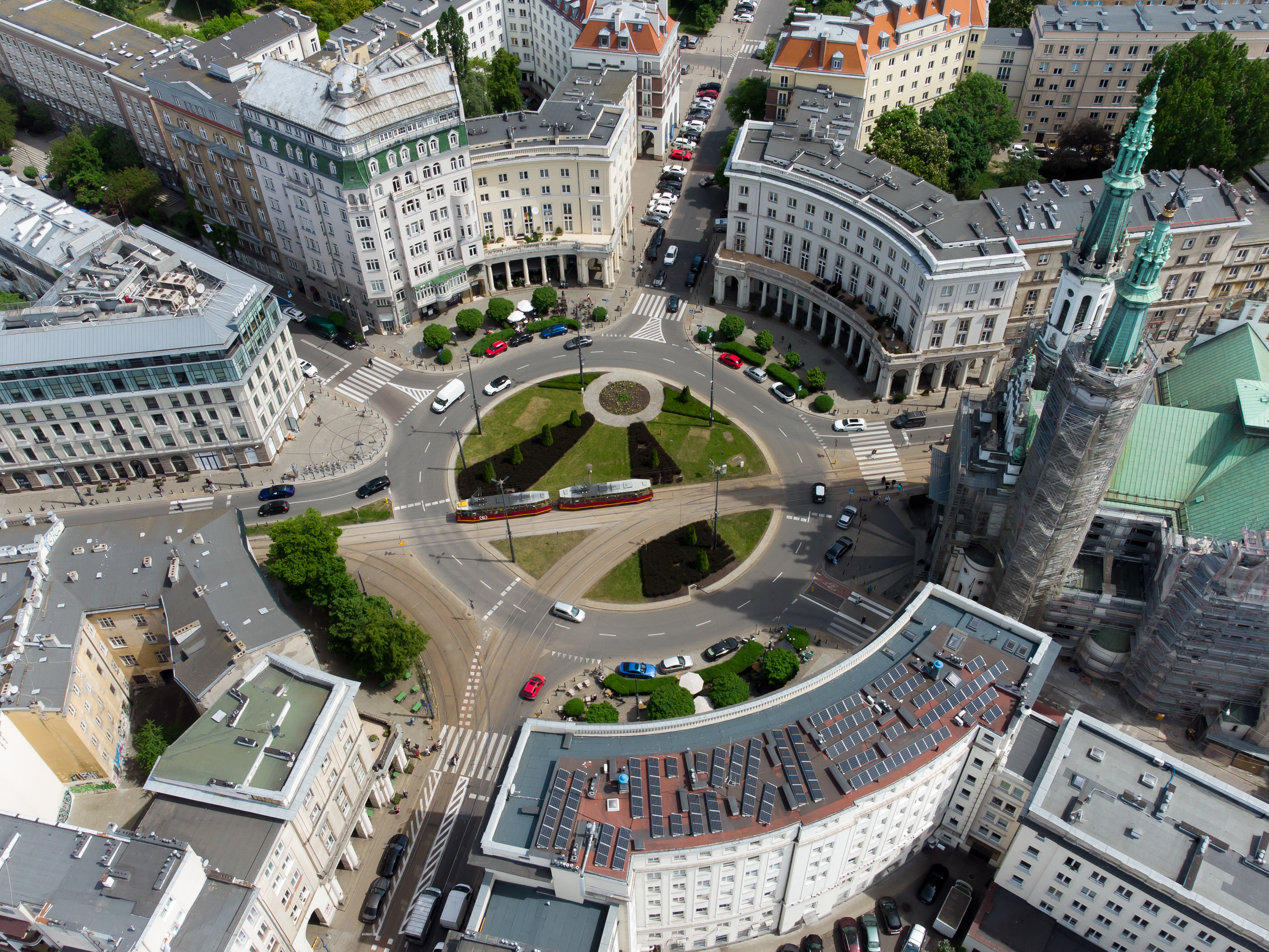
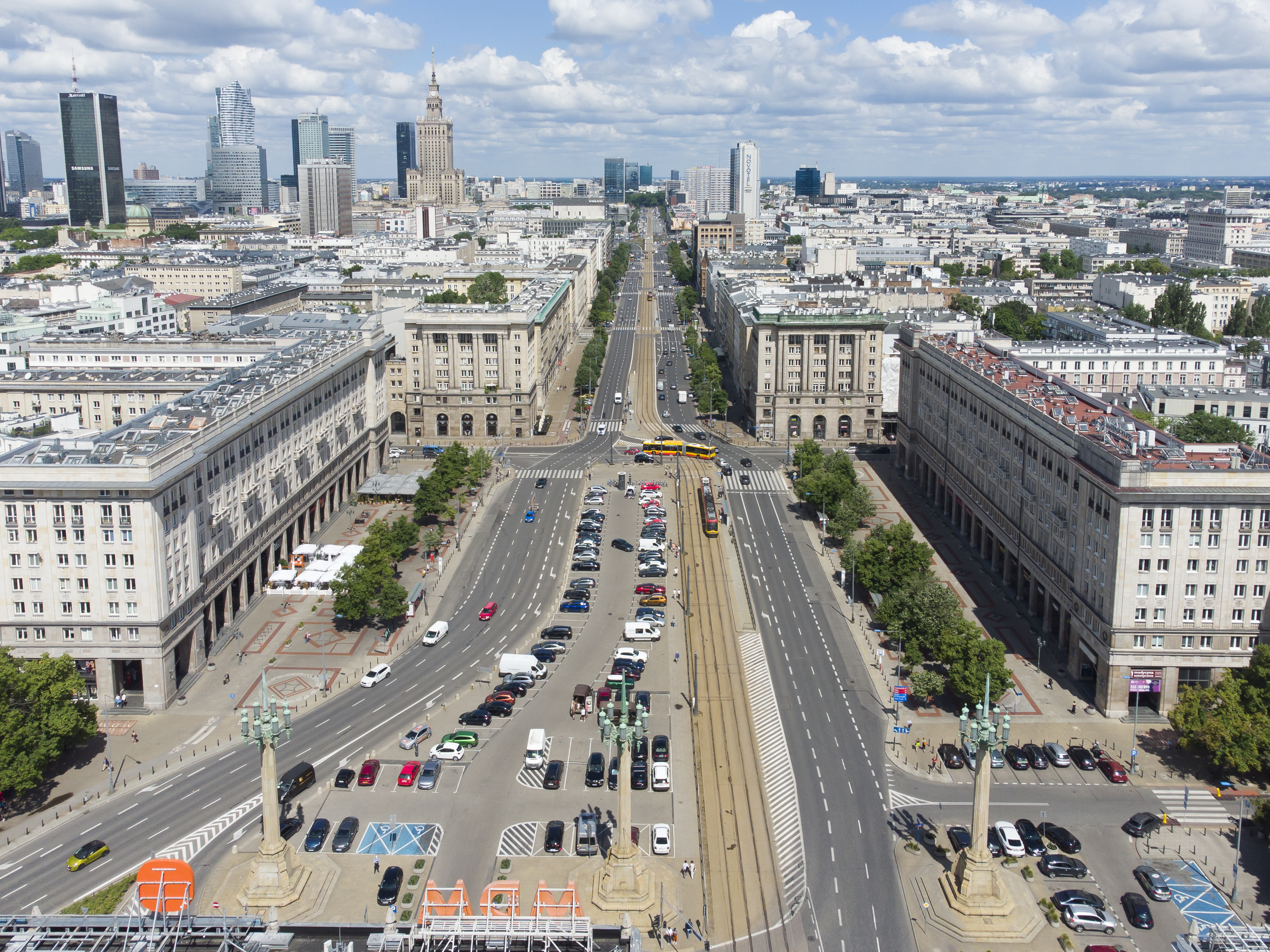
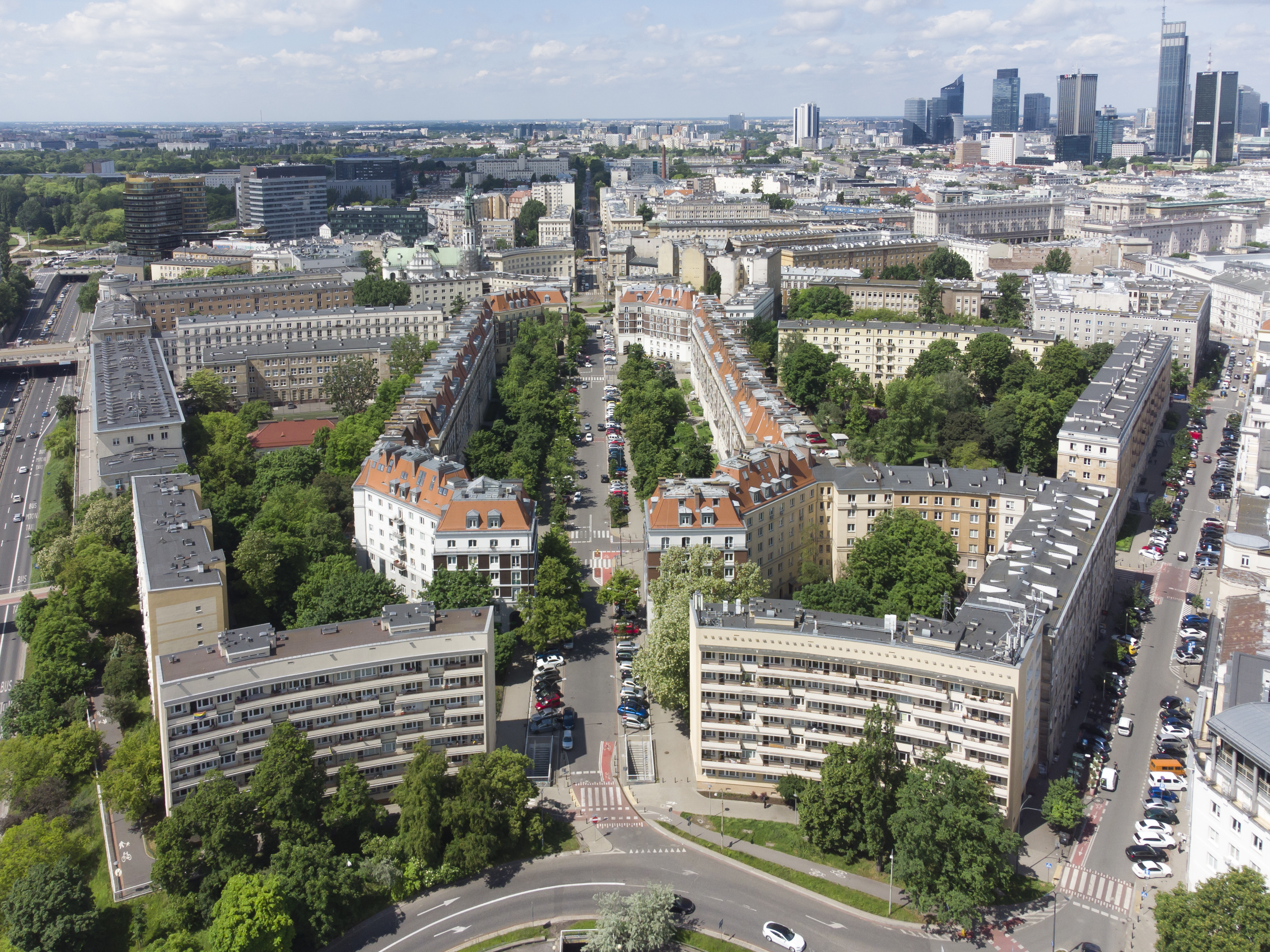
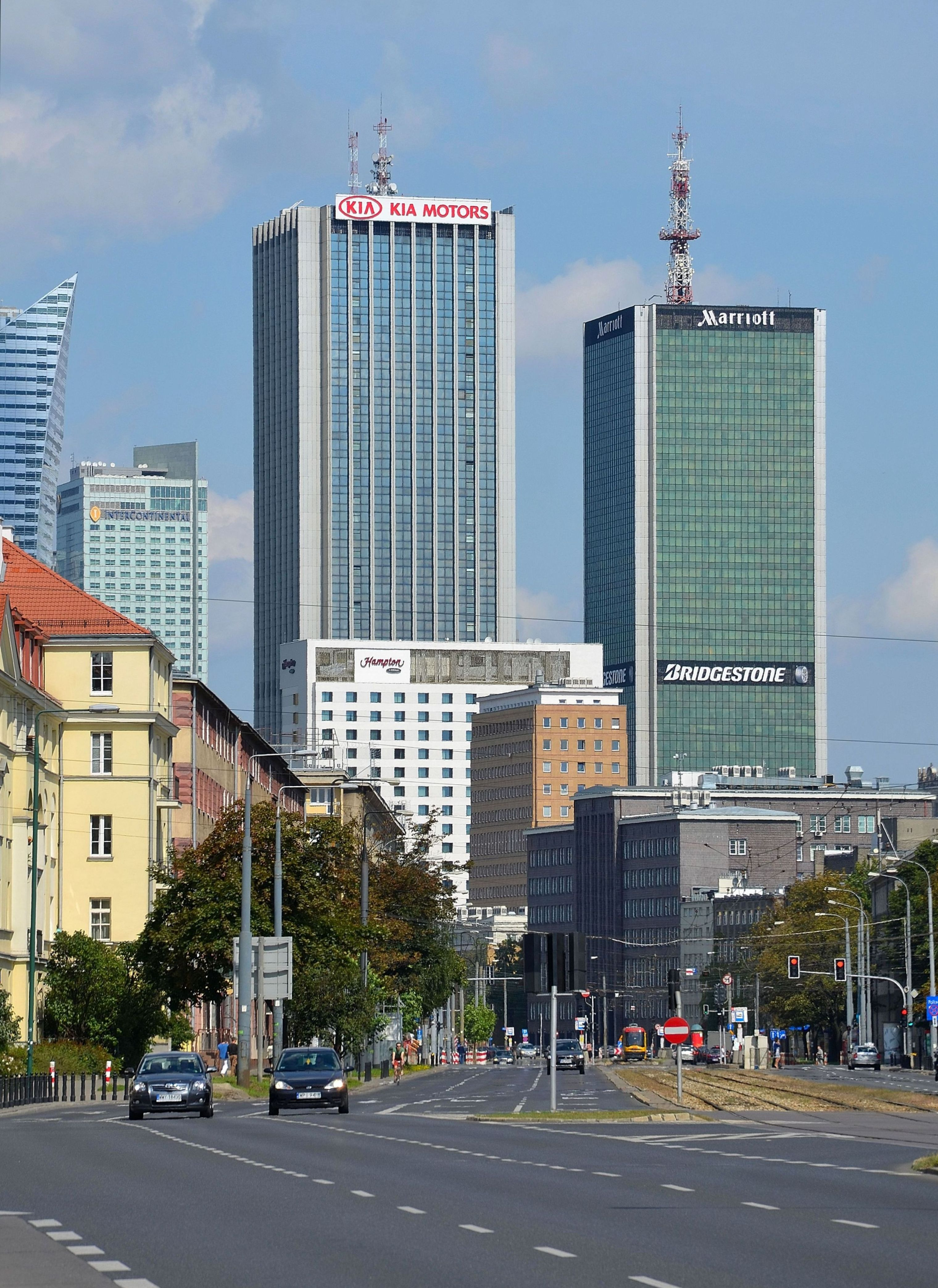
- Saviour Square Constitution Square Neighbourhood of Latawiec Chałubińskiego 8 and LIM Center

- The location of the City Information System of the South Downtown in the district of Downtown.
- Coordinates: 52°13′22.33″N 21°00′56.94″E
- Country: Poland
- Voivodeship: Masovian
- City and county: Warsaw
- District: Downtown
- Administrative neighbourhoods: Koszyki; Krucza; Oleandrów; Powiśle-Solec
- Elevation: 120 m (390 ft)
- Time zone: UTC+1 (CET)
  - Summer (DST): UTC+2 (CEST)
- Area code: +48 22

South Downtown (Polish: Śródmieście Południowe [ɕrudˈmjɛɕ.t͡ɕɛ pɔ.wudˈɲɔ.vɛ]) is a neighbourhood in Warsaw, Poland, located in the Downtown district. It is predominently a mid-rise residential area, with tenements and apartment residential buildings, as well as office and commercial spaces.

The area includes the housing estates of the Marshal Residential District and Latawiec. The neighbourhood includes numerous historic tenements, some dating to the late 19th and early 20th centuries. It also features several office building, including its two tallest skyscrapers, LIM Center and Chałubińskiego 8, which have the total height of 150 m (492.1 ft.) and 170 m (557.7 ft.), respectively, and each having the architectural height of 140 m (459.3 ft.). South Downtown also includes green spaces, such as parts of Mokotów Field park complex and Marshal Edward Rydz-Śmigły Park. The campus and most faculty buildings of Warsaw University of Technology are also housed within the neighbourhood. The neighbourhood includes the Warsaw National Museum, the largest museum in the city and one of the largest in the country, as well as the other institutions such as the Mausoleum of Struggle and Martyrdom, and the Museum of the Earth of the Polish Academy of Sciences. South Downtown features the compex which houses the Sejm and Senate, the lower and upper houses of the Parliament of Poland. The area also has three historic Roman Catholic parish churches, the Church of the Holiest Saviour, St. Alexander Church, and Sts. Apostles Peter and Paul Church, as well as the St. Barbara Chappel. The neighbourhood is served by the Politechnika station of the M1 line of the Warsaw Metro underground rapid transit system.

The area of South Downtown began developing in the 18th century from small suburban towns of Bielino, Bożydar-Kałęczyn, and Nowogrodzka. The Stanislavian Axis, an urban layout of roads and urban squares connecting Warsaw with the Ujazdów Castle, was developed between 1768 and 1770, with Crossroads, Polytechnic, Saviour, Three Crosses, and Union of Lublin being created as part of it. They were later further developed in the third quoter of the 18th century. In 1776, two garden complexes, Na Książęcem Park and the Frascati Gardens, were developed in the northeastern side of the neighbourhood, later being redeveloped and reopened as the Marshal Edward Rydz-Śmigły Park in 1955. The area was incorporated into the city of Warsaw in 1974. The development of the neighbourhood continued in the 19th century, especially following the opening of the Vienna Station in 1845. It led to the construction of luxury tenements, with restaurants, stores and services in the area. In 1898, the Warsaw University of Technology was founded, and in 1910, the Mokotów Aerodrome was opened in the southwest part of the neighbourhood, operating until 1947. The Mokotów Field park complex was later developed in its place between the 1970s and the 1990s.

In 1939, while the city was under German occupation during the Second World War, a section of South Downtown centred on Szucha Avenue was transformed into the Police District, a restricted area housing the Security Police and the Gestapo. During the Warsaw Uprising, from 1 September 1944, the area became a battleground of German forces and Polish partisans of the Home Army. Following the defeat of the uprising, the population was evicted, and a large portion of the city was razed, including South Downtown, which had already been heavily destroyed during the fighting. The neighbourhood and many of its historical buildings were rebuilt after the conflict. Followed the end of the war, new housing estates were developed in the neighbourhood, including the Marshal Residential District and Latawiec in the 1950s. The two tallest skyscrapers in South Downtown, Chałubińskiego 8 and LIM Center, were opened in 1975 and 1989, respectively. The neighbourhood also experienced development of numerous office and retail buildings, beginning in the 1970s, and continued through the first quoter of the 21st century. In 1995, the Politechnika station was opened, connecting the neighbourhood with the Warsaw Metro rapid system network.

== History ==
=== Emergence of the suburban area ===
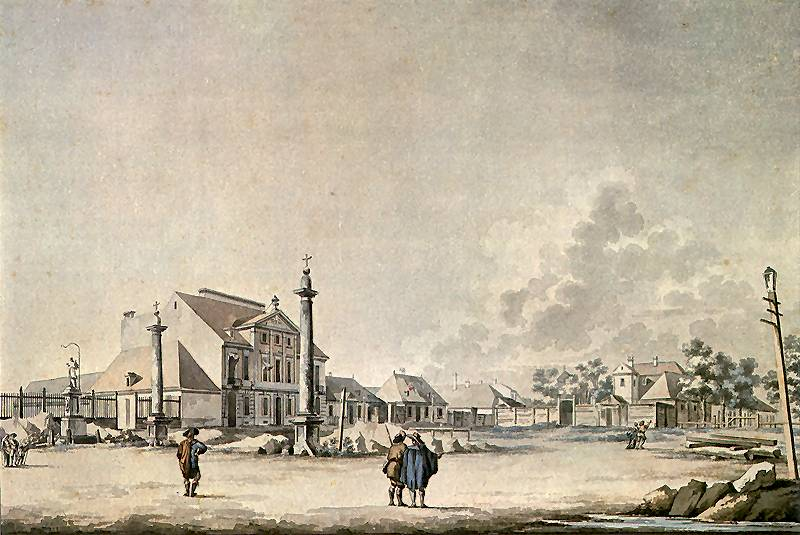
The 1785 painting by Zygmunt Vogel, depicting Three Crosses Square.

In the 18th century, several independent satellite towns (jurydyka) located outside both Old Warsaw and New Warsaw were established with royal decrees. They operated independently with their own laws and tax exemptions. Within the area of modern South Downtown, this included: Bożydar-Kałęczyn in the area of modern Jerusalem Avenue, established in 1702; the southern portion of Bielino in the area of Wilcza Street, established in 1766; and Nowogrodzka in the area of Nowogrodzka Street, established in 1767.

Between 1768 and 1770, an urban layout of streets, known as the Stanislavian Axis, was developed on the initiative of king Stanisław August Poniatowski. It connected Old Warsaw and its satellite towns, with the Ujazdów Castle. It involved five roundabouts, later developed into urban squares, now known as Crossroads, Polytechnic, Saviour, Three Crosses, and Union of Lublin. Its main axis was formed by the Royal Road, connecting the castle to the Wola Election Field, which hosted the royal elections of the Polish–Lithuanian Commonwealth, and was placed alongside the Piaseczno Canal. The other main streets of the layout were Nowowiejska, Niemcewicza, Prądzyńskiego Streets, and Emancipation Avenue.

Beginning at the swamps near the modern Starynkiewicz Square and flowing out to the Vistula river, the Żurawka river was an important water source in the Warsaw agglomeration due to the large quantity of flowing water in it. It had originally flowed though the area now occupied by South Downtown until it was channeled into underground pipes and canals in the 18th century, so as to flow underneath what are now Żurawia, Czerniakowska, and Okrąg Streets.

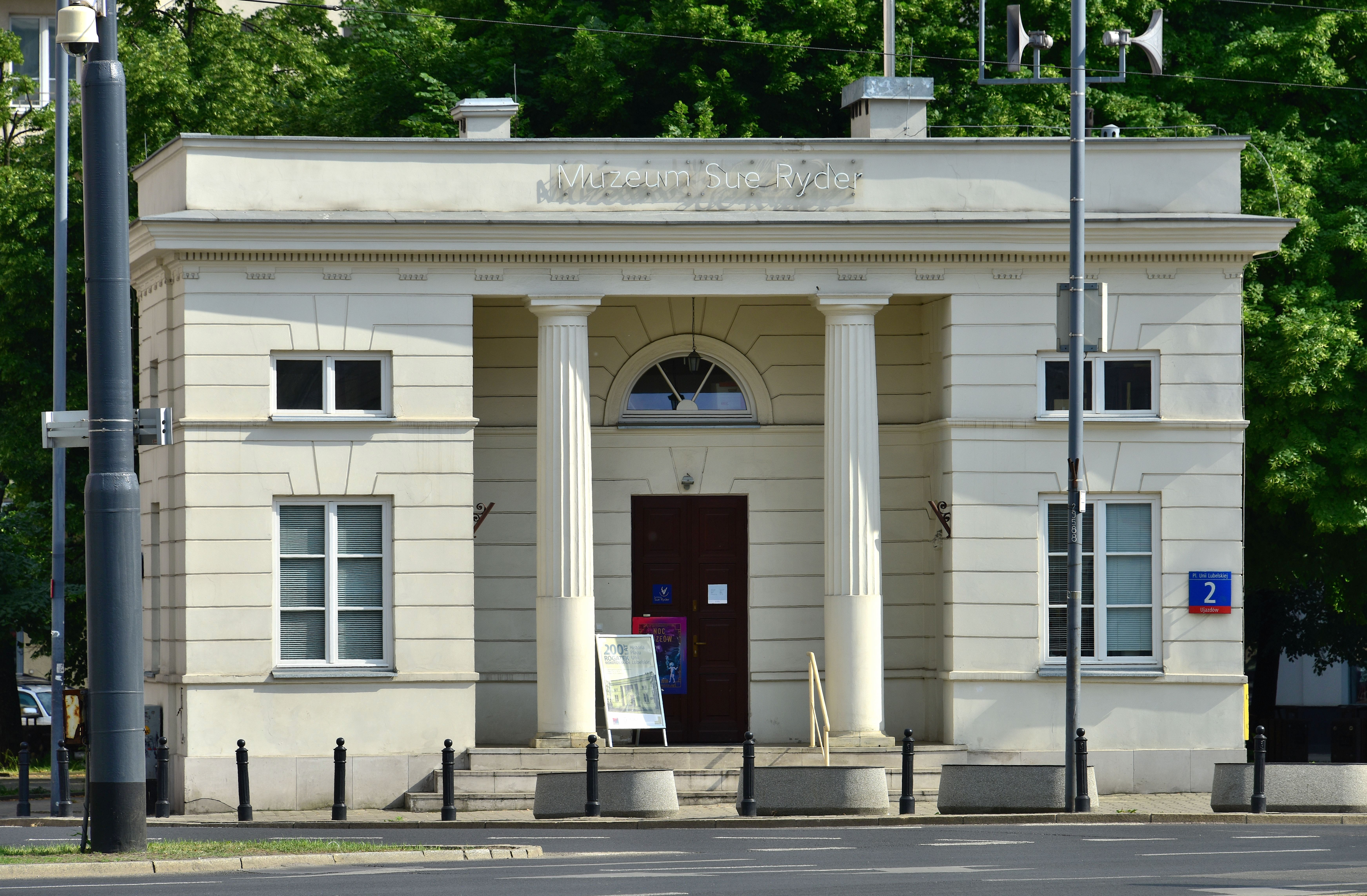
The east pavilion of Mokotów Tollhouses at Union of Lublin Square, built in 1818.

During the last third of the 18th century a number of urbanising developments took place in the satellite towns connected by the Stanislavian Axis. In 1770, the Lubomirski Ramparts, a series of dirt ramparts were erected around Warsaw and its satellite towns, to decrease the spread of the plague during its second pandemic. The tollhouses were established at the entrances and exits to the agglomeration, on the roads crossing the rampart lines. One of them was placed at on Union of Lublin Square, to the north of the village of Mokotów, with two pavilions placed on both sides of the current Puławska Street. In 1818, the buildings at the square were replaced with two neoclassical pavilions, called the Mokotów Tollhouses. The plague, which was expected to reach the city in 1771, was instead halted by a harsh winter. In 1794, during the Kościuszko Uprising, the ramparts were enforced with cannons placed in front and behind them, forming parts of the city fortifications during the siege of Warsaw the same year. In 1825, the ramparts were renovated, to aid in enforcing duty collection at the city boundaries. A portion alongside Koszykowa Street was moved to the south to Nowowiejska Street. The ramparts were removed in 1875, following the abolishment of the duty fees from entiring the city.

In 1774, the neighbourhood of Nowa Jerozolima (lit. 'New Jerusalem') was established as part of the town of Bożydar-Kałęczyn, then owned by August Kazimierz Sułkowski. Located between the modern Artur Zawisza Square and Kaliska Street it was inhabited by a Jewish community, despite being in violation of a law which forbade Jewish people from living in Old Warsaw or within a 3.2 km (2 mile) radius of it. Consequently the city hall of Old Warsaw sued Sułkowski, demanding the neighbourhood be destroyed. Despite residents' protests it was demolished on 23 January 1776, with its inhabitants being displaced and their trading goods confiscated.

In 1776, prince Kazimierz Poniatowski founded two garden complexes, Na Książecem and Na Górce, which would later form the Na Książęcem Park and the Frascati Gardens, respectively. They were located to the east of Three Crosses Square, in the area of the current Książęca Street, with the Na Książęcem Park also including Elizeum, an underground rotunda with corridors and caves. In the late 18th century, king Stanisław August Poniatowski founded the agricultural estate of Koszyki, located within the triangular area marked out by Koszykowa, Śniadeckich, and Noakowskiego Streets. In 1778 its ownership was granted to diplomat Pierre-Maurice Glayre, who built a small residence there known as the Koszyki Manor House, and over time a small settlement developed nearby. The estate changed ownership several times, and in 1872 it was partitioned and sold for the construction of tenement houses, with the manor house itself being demolished in 1899.

In 1784, on the initiative of king Stanisław August Poniatowski, the hamlet of Nowa Wieś (lit. 'New Village') was established for people displaced from the village of Ujazdów due to construction of the Ujazdów Castle. The settlement consisted of 12 houses, symmetrically placed in two rows along the Royal Road between Saviour and Polytechnic Squares, on the current Nowowiejska Street. The village also owned 106 hectares of farmlands, which were very profitable for the local residents.

=== Urban development ===
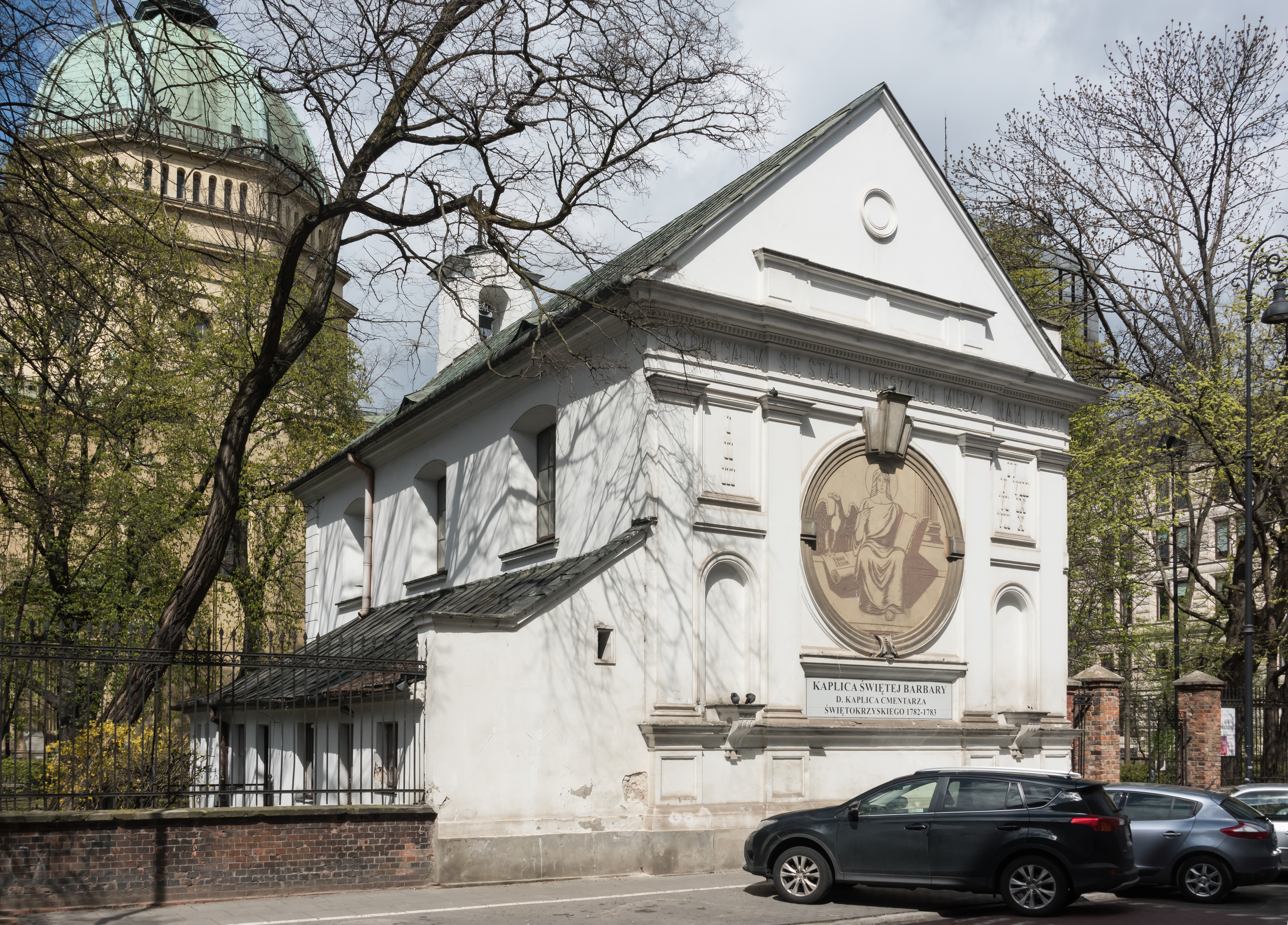
The St. Barbara Chapel, built in 1782.

In 1791, the Free Royal Cities Act abolished the satellite towns, including Bielino, Bożydar-Kałęczyn, and Nowogrodzka, joining them together with Old Warsaw and New Warsaw into the new singular entity of the city of Warsaw. However the execution of the act was halted by the Targowica Confederation, delaying its administrative implementation until 1794.

On 9 August 1783, the Holy Cross Cemetery was opened near the Koszyki Manor House, outside of city boundaries, between Marszłkowska, Nowogrodzka, Plater, and Wspólna Streets. It was operated by the Roman Catholic parish of the Holy Cross Church. Following the Third Partition of Poland in 1795, the Prussian administration outlawed burials of deceased in the city, resulting in a large increase in the popularity of the cemetery. By 1820, it was overcrowded, and in total, over 130,000 people were buried there. It was closed for new burials in 1831, and fully shot down in 1836. By 1851, the unmaintained cemetery fell into decay, and in 1859, the municipal authorities decided to demolish it. The families were given the possibility to move their relatives to the Powązki Cemetery until 1 January 1860, after which the remaining bodies were relocated to mass graves. In the following five years, The cemetery was demolished over the next five years, with trees and bushes planted in its place.

In 1866, a former cemetery chapel at the current 68 Wspólna Street, dating to 1782, was elevated to the status of a parish church, under the name of the St. Barbara Chapel. Between 1883 and 1886, the Sts. Apostles Peter and Paul Church was built nearby at 18 Plater Street. It was designed in the Romanesque Revival style.

In 1818, the farmlands to the south of Warsaw were bought by the city, and turned into a military training area, later known as the Mokotów War Field. In around 1825, it became the cavalry drill site. The area was incorporated into the city in 1916.

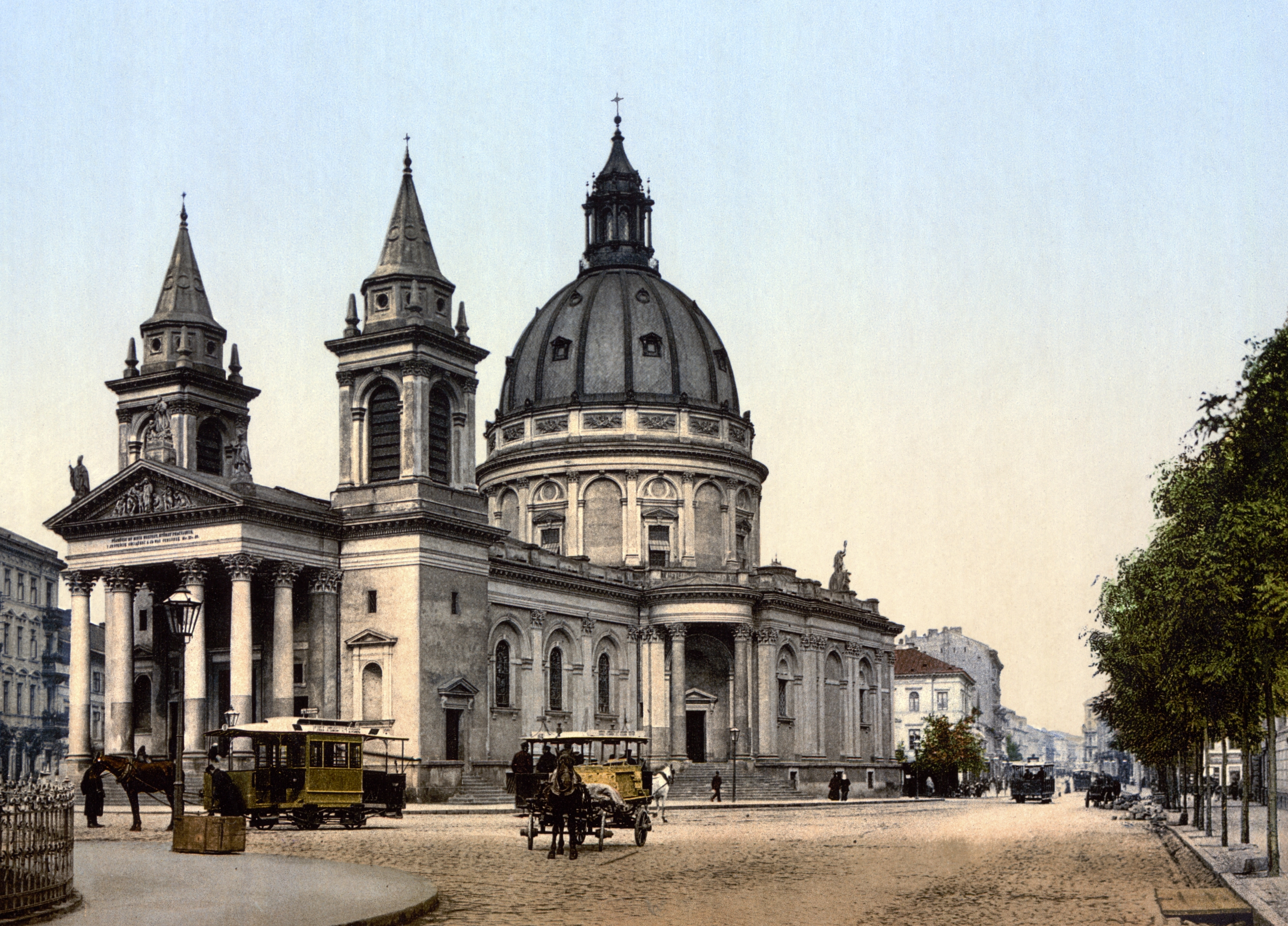
The St. Alexander Church at Three Crosses Square, built in 1825. Photography made sometime between 1910 and 1926.

In 1825, the St. Alexander Church, was built at Three Crosses Square, belonging to the Roman Catholic denomination. It was designed by Chrystian Piotr Aigner, in the neoclassical style. Its construction was proposed in 1915 by Alexander I, the Tsar of Russia and King of Poland, during his first visit to the city.

In 1827, a garden square known as the Swiss Valley Park was opened between Piękna Street and Róż Avenue.

In 1870, the Warsaw Pomological Garden was also founded as an urban park and an orchard, placed between Nowogrodzka, Plater, Wspólna and Chałubińskiego Streets. It was destroyed in 1944, during the Second World War.

In the first half of the 19th century, a horce racecourse was built at the Mokotów War Field, thanks to the efforts of Ivan Paskevich, the Viceroy of Poland. The first race officially organised by the Kingdom of Poland was held there in 1841. Various races and exhibitions were held at the venue in the following years, until outlawed in 1861. The ban was lifted in 1880. In 1887, a new venue, the Mokotów Field Racecourse, was built on Polna Street, and in 1895, it hosted the first annual Great Warsaw Race, the most prestigious horse race in Poland. The venue was closed down in 1938, and its events were moved to the Służewiec Racecourse, at Puławska Street.

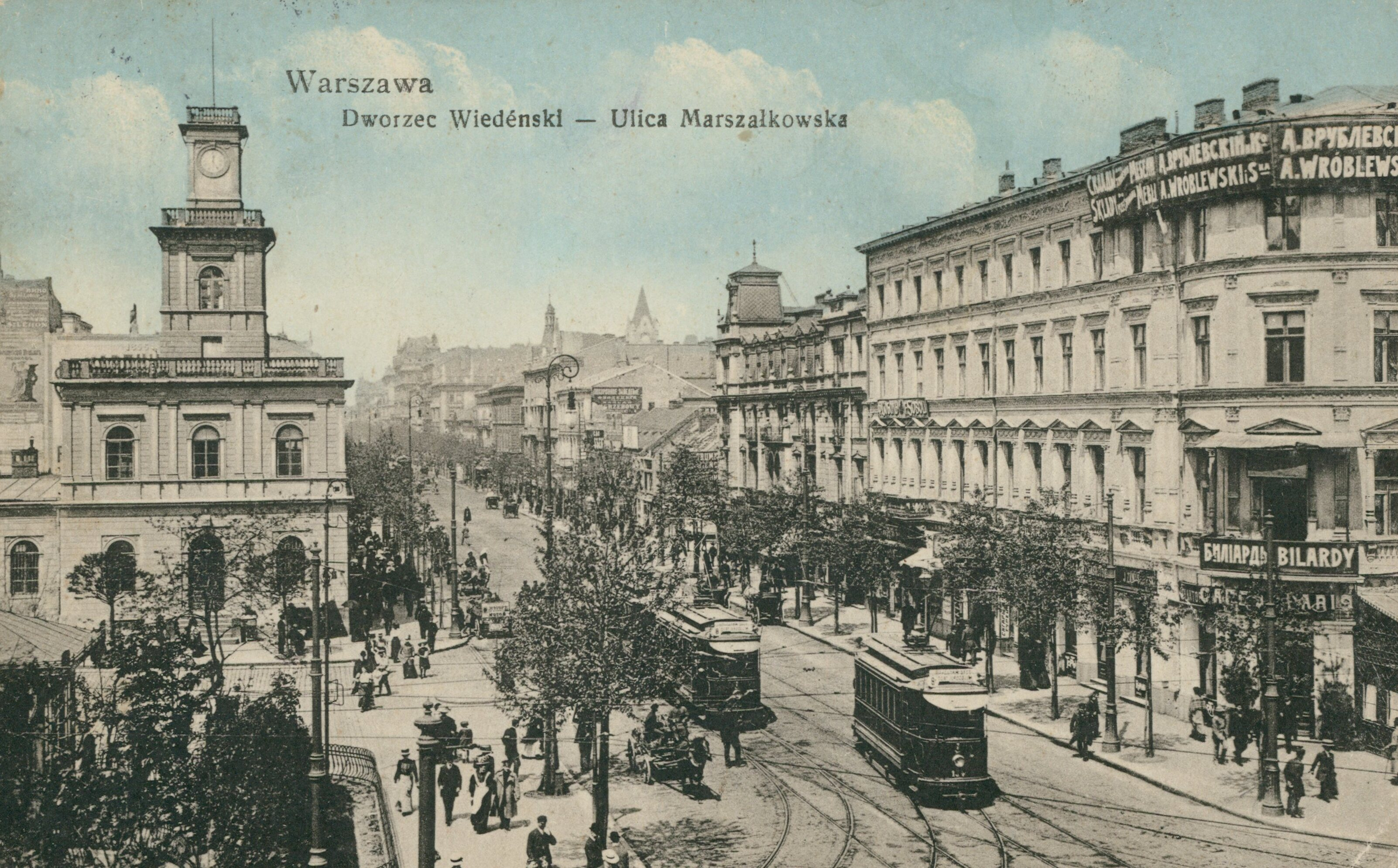
Marszałkowska Street sometime before 1918.

The major development in the area of South Downtown began in the second half of the 19th century, with the construction of the Vienna Station in 1845, which became the terminal station of the Warsaw–Vienna railway line. It was built at the intersection of Jerusalem Avenue and Marszałkowska Street, with luxury tenements alongside both roads, together with numerous restaurants, stores, and services. By 1912, the area extended to Union of Lublin Square, and featured numerous restaurants, stores, and services.

In 1895, the Maurycy Mitte Secondary School of Mechanics and Machinery, a vocational school of mechanics, was opened at 4 and 6 Mokotowska Street. It would become known as the Hipolit Wawelberg and Stanisław Rotwand Engineering School, and since 1909, it unofficially functioned as a technological university. It was nationalised in 1919 and received its official university status in 1929. In 1933, it moved to a new location at 14 Św. Andrzeja Boboli Street, where it operated until its closing in 1951. Its former building was destroyed during the Second World War. In 1898, the Warsaw University of Technology (then known as the Tsar Nicholas II Polytechnic Institute) was also founded at 81 Marszałkowska Street. In 1901 it moved to a new building at 1 Polytechnic Square. The same year, several other faculty buildings were also opened. Its campus continued developing in the following decades, with new faculties opened throughout the 1920s and 1930s.

In the late 1890s, the area around Ujazdów Avenue, became a luxurious neighbourhood mostly inhabited by a wealthy Russian population. In 1894, the St. Michael the Archangel Church was opened at 12 Ujazdów Avenue and next to Crossroads Square. As a Russian Orthodox temple, it mainly served Russian soldiers and civilians living in the neighbourhood. Following the retreat of the Imperial Russian Army from Warsaw in 1915, the Russian population mostly fled the city, and the building remained mostly unoccupied and unused, being torn down in 1923.

In 1881, the second horsecar in the city, was opened connecting Union of Lublin Square with Muranów, and was replaced with electric trams in 1908. In 1892, the Warszawa narrow-gauge railway station (later renamed to Warszawa Mokotów in 1930), was opened at the square, between Puławska and Chocimska Streets. It was a part of two lines operated by the Wilanów Railway, with a third line, operated by the Grójec Commuter Railway added in 1898. The station was moved in 1935 further south, to the intersection of Puławska and Odyńca Streets, where it operated until 1938.

In 1909, a large market hall known as the Koszyki Hall opened at 61 and 63 Koszykowa Street.

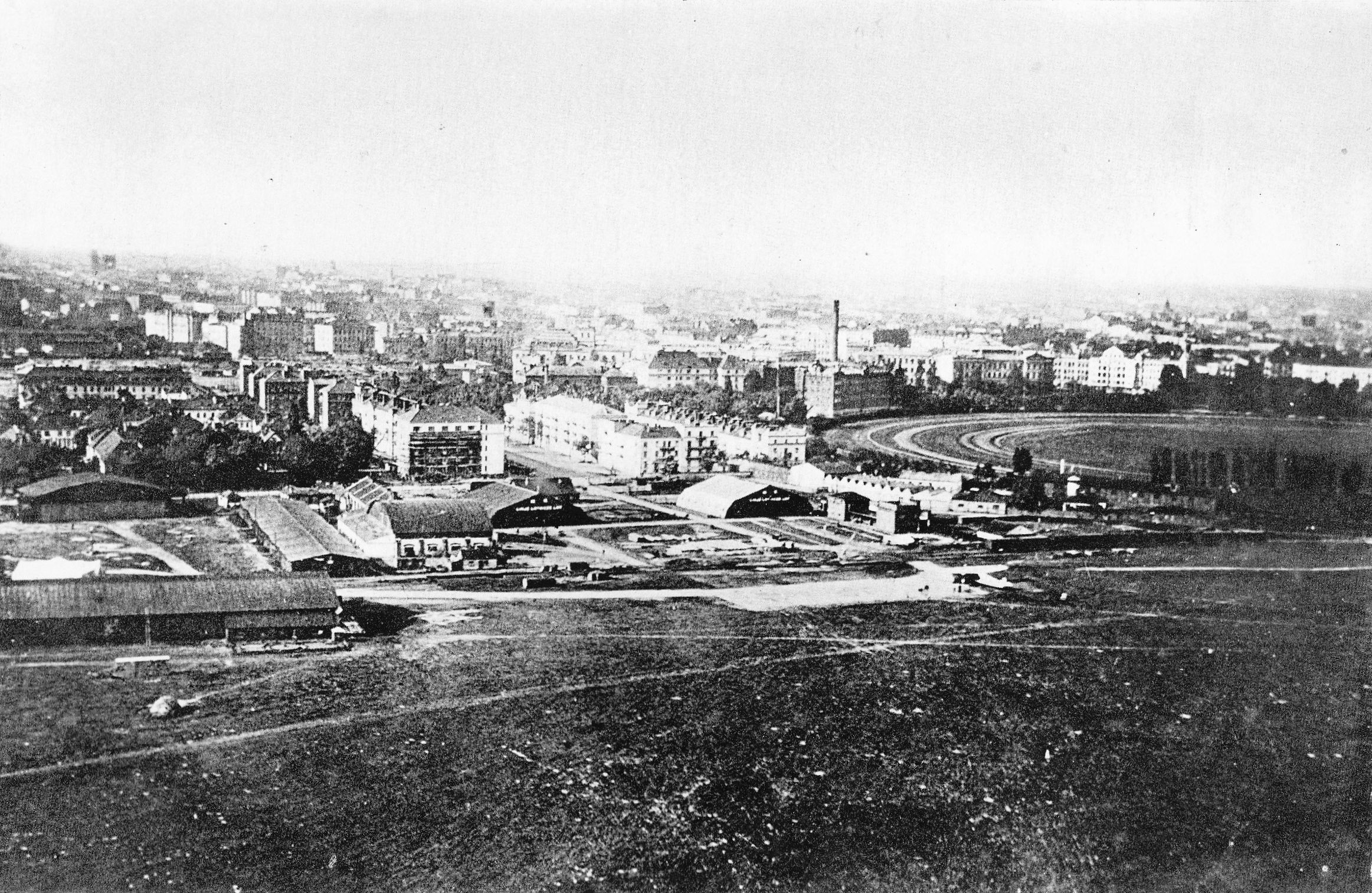
The Mokotów Aerodrome in the 1930s.

In 1910, the Mokotów Aerodrome was established at the Mokotów War Field, featuring dirt runways. It became the city's first aerodrome, and until the outbreak of the First World War, it was a popular civil and sports airfield. Following the beginning of the conflict in 1915, it began being used by the Imperial Russian Air Service, which stationed there six fighter planes. In August of the same year, the aerodrome was captured and used by the German Air Combat Forces. Its infrastructure was updated and expanded, and 21 new hangars were constructed, including those for the Parseval airships. Following the end of the war, and the establishment of the Second Polish Republic, in 1919, the aerodrome became a base for the growing military and civilian aviation industry. Since 1920, international passenger flights were chartered there. In 1929, it became the headquarters of the then-established national LOT Polish Airlines. It was also a venue for numerous air shows, parades, and international aviation tournaments. In 1934, the passenger traffic was moved to the Warsaw Chopin Airport in Okęcie. Following this, Independence Avenue was built between 1934 and 1938, crossing the cleared eastern side of the aerodrome. It formed a major arterial road connecting Mokotów with Downtown. It partially incorporated the former Topolowa Street in Mokotów. The aerodrome was closed down in 1947.

In 1918, an abandoned building of the all-female high school, located at Wiejska Street was adopted to house the Legislative Sejm of Poland. Following the renovations, the first government meeting was hosted in the building on 10 February 1919. In 1922, a nearby abandoned lazaret building, was also adopted to house the Senate of Poland. Between 1925 and 1935, the complex had been furtherly expanded.

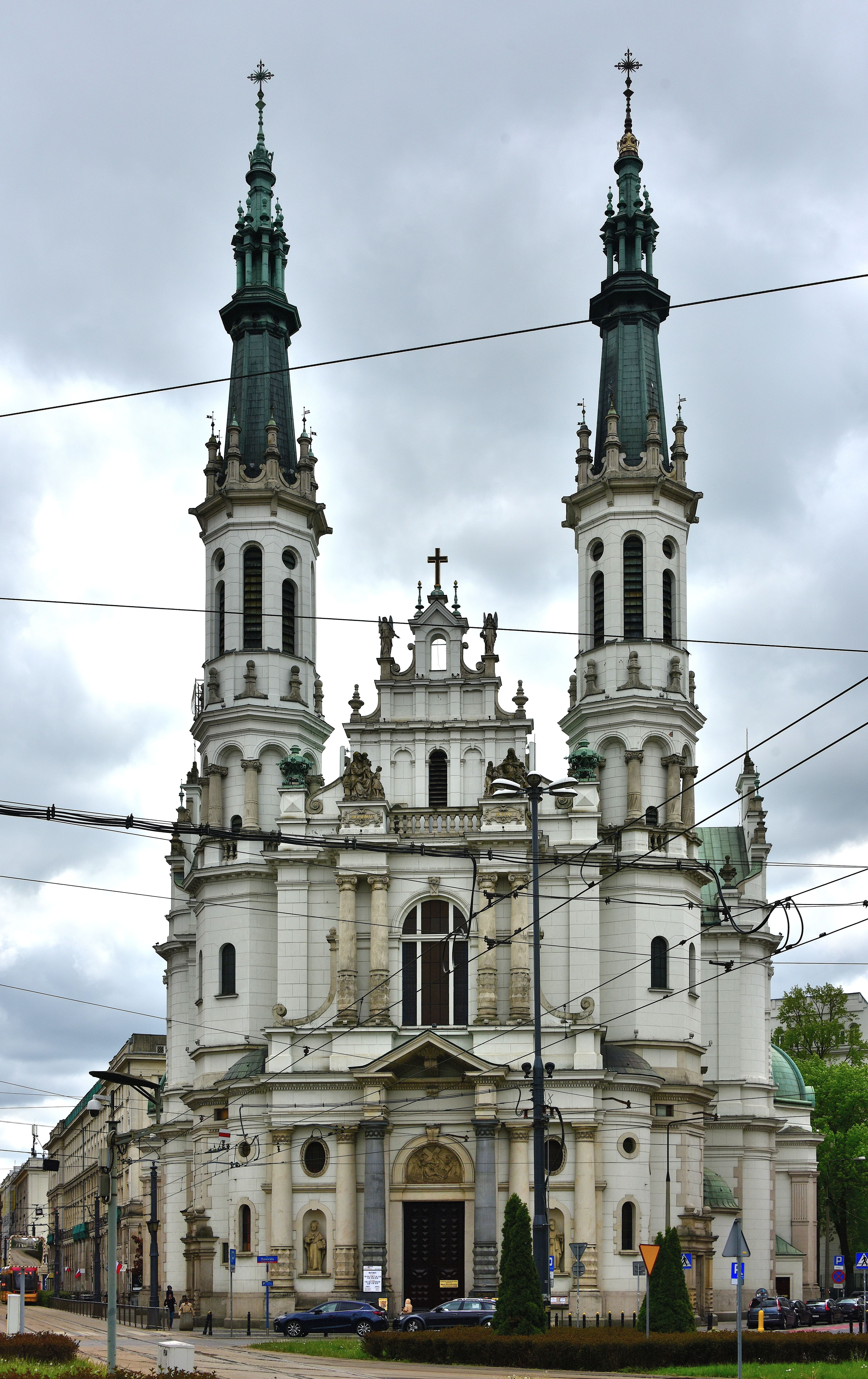
The Church of the Holiest Saviour at Saviour Square, built in 1927.

Between 1901 and 1927, the Church of the Holiest Saviour, which belongs to the Roman Catholic denomination, was built at Saviour Square.

In 1925, the portion of the Frascati Gardens was sold of for the construction of a neighbourhood of villas. In the 1930s, the area was further developed with luxury tenements.

In 1927, two railway stations were opened at Nowogrodzka Street, including Warszawa Marszałkowska EKD, located between Marszałkowska and Poznańska Streets, which was operated by the Electric Commuter Railways, and Warszawa Chałubińskiego WKD, between Chałubińskiego and Plater Streets, operated by the Warsaw Commuter Railway. They were closed in 1957 and 1963 respectively.

From 1927 to 1938, the new building of the Warsaw National Museum was built at 1 and 3 Jerusalem Avenue. Some portions of the museum were opened to the public years before the completion of the construction. In 1933, the Polish Army Museum was opened in the eastern wing of the building, where it remained until 2023, when it moved to the Warsaw Citadel.

In 1934, the Telecommunication Systems Centre, which housed the Central Telecommunications Office, was opened at 45 Nowogrodzka Street. It became the first building in Poland to be built with the steel frame construction.

=== Second World War ===
==== German occupation ====
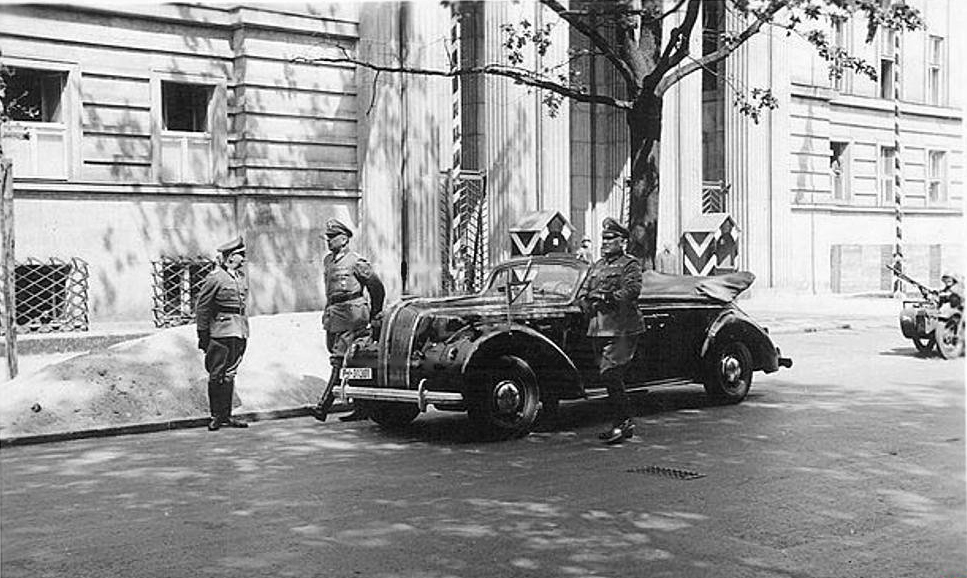
The headquarters of the Security Police and Gestapo at 25 Szuch Avenue, sometime after 1940.

On 1 September 1939, Germany invaded Poland, beginning the Second World War. On 9 September, the German Army began an attack on the city, supported by an aerial and artillery bombardment. The 2nd battalion of the 12th Motorised Rifle Regiment, and the 2nd Battalion of the 35th Tank Regiment, charged through the Mokotów Aerodrome, before being forced to retreat around the intersection of Independence Avenue and Wawelska Street, by the fire from the Polish infantry and artillery in Mokotów and Ochota. During the siege of Warsaw, the aerodrome served as a base of the Polish Air Force, housing fighter planes used in the air defense of the city. The city of Warsaw capitulated on 28 September 1939, becoming part of the occupied territories of the General Government. It was captured and used by the Germans for the anti-aircraft defence.

Between October 1939 and April 1940, as part of what became known as the Intelligentsia mass shootings, a large number of members of the Polish educated class and high society were executed by German officers in the gardens of the Sejm building. The number of people executed remains unknown, however, it is estimated at between a few hundred and a thousand.

The Police District was established in the southeastern portion of the neighbourhood, with Ujazdów Avenue, Nowowiejska Street, Klonowa Street, and the Flory Street forming its boundaries. Szuch Avenue became its main road, and was renamed to Police Street. The district designated only for the German population, with other ethnicities being banned from entering it. The Government District was also established to the north with the same restrictions, being located in the area of Piłsudski Square in North Downtown. Since April 1942, both areas were connected via a tram line no. 0, which was also designated only for German passengers. The Police District was originally planned to be part of a larger German District, which would be limited only for the German population. It was envisioned to occupy most of South Downtown and a large portion of Mokotów. The plan was never executed, due to logistical issues with evicting people who already inhabited the area. Additionally, the German population lacked interest in the project, fearing that concentrating in one area would make it a target of Allied bombings.

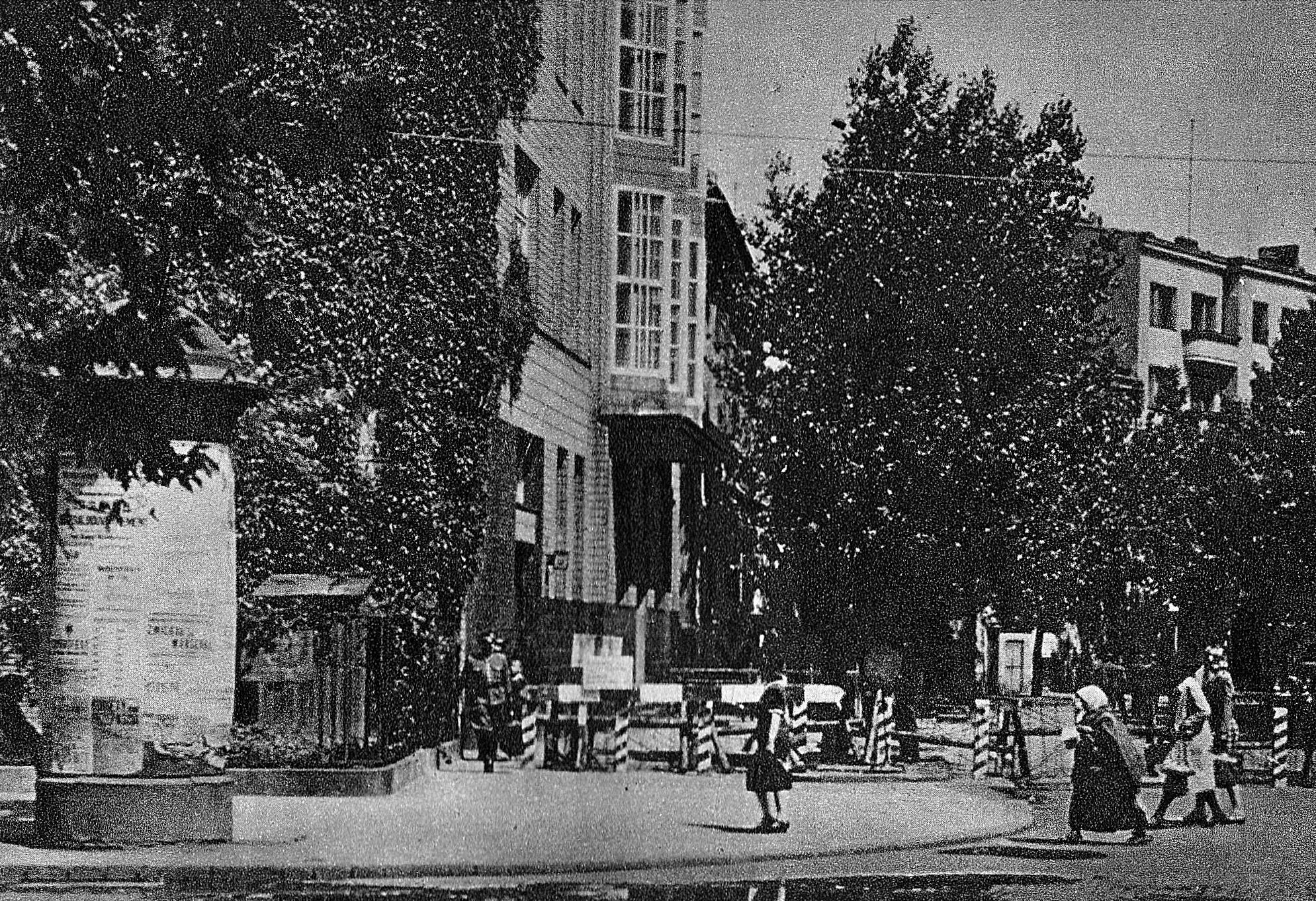
The entrance to the Police District at the intersection of Litewska and Marszałkowska Street, circa 1943.

The area of the Police District was transformed to house offices of the occupant law enforcement structures and apartments for their employees. The most important of them was the building of the former Ministry of Religious Affairs and Public Education located at the 25 Szuch Avenue, which was refitted into the headquarters of the Commander-in-Chief of Security Police Office of the Warsaw District, which housed the structures of the Security Police and Gestapo (Secret State Police). It employed around 300 people, with their offices being located at the second and third floors. The holding cells and interrogation rooms were located at the first floor and in the basement. They held people suspected to be connected with the Polish resistance movement. Prisoners were brutally tortured to force the confessions, causing many of them to die. Around 100 people were interrogated there every day.

Other notable buildings in the area included:

- the headquarters of the commander in chief of the Order Police, located in the Supreme Audit Office Building at the 23 Szuch Avenue;
- the headquarters of the leader of the Security Police and the Oder Police of the Warsaw District, located in the Gawroński Villa at the 23 Ujazdów Avenue;
- the headquarters of the Criminal Police, located at the 7 and 9 Ujazdów Avenue (currently 11 Ujazdów Avenue);
- the Garrison Officer Casino located at the 29 Szuch Avenue, which operated as the casino for German officers, and was also opened people who collaborated with them;
- the Re-education Labour Camp of the Security Police, located at the 14 Litewska Street, which, from Autumn 1943 to 1944, operated as a labour camp for the Polish prisoners convicted of light crimes.

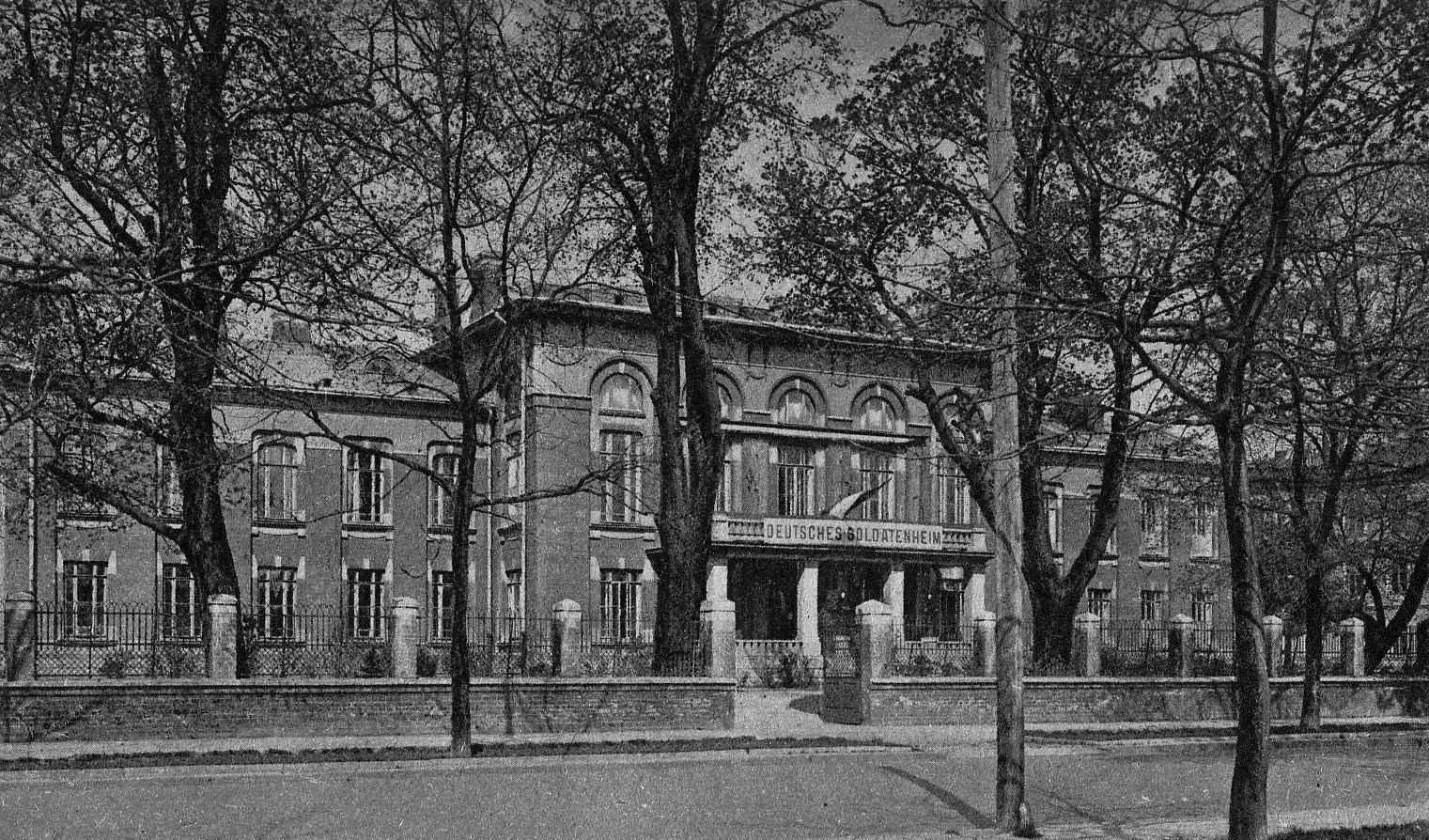
The building of a Garrison Officer Casino, open for the German officers, and people who collaborated with them, which was a target on a bombing on 19 May 1942, organised by the Polish resistance.

The Police District was protected by security forces, stationed around its boundaries, including two battalions of the Order Police, stationed in the Sejm and Senate Complex on Wiejska Street. Throughout the war, the Polish resistance movement organised a few attacks aimed at the occupants in the Police District. On 19 May 1942, members of the Polish Socialists, disguised as customers, planted a bomb in the casino building at 29 Szuch Avenue, which served Poles who collaborated with occupants. The explosion had killed 7 people, and wounded a few more. On 1 February 1944, as part of the Operation Kutschera, the Pegaz (previously known as Agat) squad of the Home Amy had assassinated Franz Kutschera, the leader of the Security Police and the Order Police of the Warsaw District, responsible for the summary executions of about 5,000 people in the city. It was the most important successful operation of the Home Army, aimed against high-ranking occupant officers during the conflict. On 6 May 1944, in the Operation Stamm, the Pegaz squad attempted to assassinate Walter Stamm, the Sturmbannführer (assault unit leader) of the Protection Squadron, and the chief of Gestapo, on Szuch Avenue. The operation ended with failure, with squad losing eight people, and not managing to kill the target. It was one of the largest and deadliest sabotage operations carried out by the Home Army during the war.

Additionally, while under occupation, the anti-aircraft artillery were stationed at the Mokotów Aerodrome by the German Air Force, with barracks for its operators being located on Puławska Street. The operations of the airport itself were limited to minimum. The headquarters of the Warsaw Airport Command of the German Air Force were located farther to the south, in the Fort M in Mokotów, with a staff of 500 people, and the barracks.

==== Warsaw Uprising ====
On 1 September 1944, at 5:00 PM, in the event known under codename W-Hour, the Polish resistance Home Army commenced the Operation Tempest against occupying German forces across the city, which begun the Warsaw Uprising. The Police District was one of the targets of the operation, with the key target there being the headquarters of the Security Police. It was attacked by the Ruczaj Battalion and the Jeleń Division, which were poorly equipped.

During the first phase of the attack, the partisans managed, while suffering heavy casualties, to capture the casino building, the portion of the ruins of the former building of the General Inspector of the Armed Forces (currently the building of the Chancellery of the Prime Minister), and the car workshops on Bagatela Street. They also unsuccessfully attempted to capture the headquarters of the Security Police, which was protected by around 800 well-equipped police and Gestapo officers, commanded by Paul Otto Geibel, the Oberführer (senior leader) of the Protection Squadron, and the leader of the Security Police and the Order Police. Partisans also shot at the building from a mortar, which forced Geibel to hide in the underground shelter. After two hours of fighting, when partisans run out of ammunition, the German forces commenced the offensive. They managed to cut off the portion of partisans of the Ruczaj Battalion in the casino building, commanded by lieutenant Zygmunt Manikowski (codename "Kosma"), from the rest of the Polic forces, after which, Manikowski and his squad were killed. The rest of the partisans were pushed back to their starting positions. The wounded and captured partisans were executed.

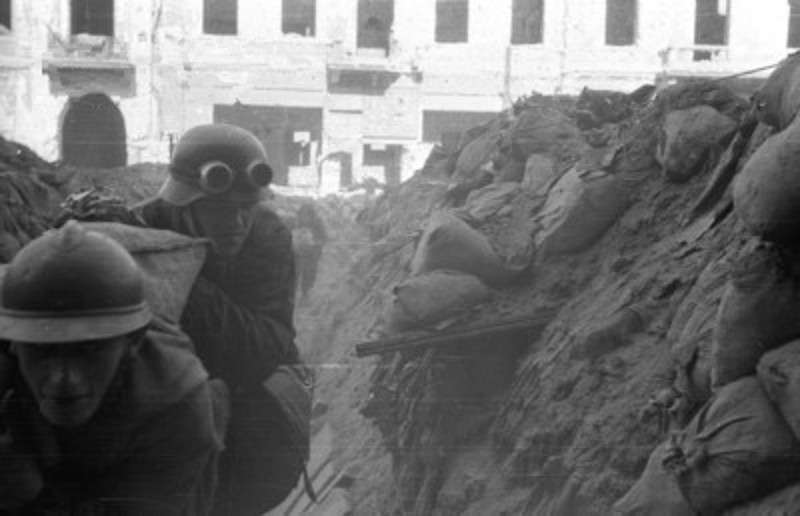
The soldiers of the Home Army in the partisan barricade in September 1944, during the Warsaw Uprising.

On 1 September 1944, the Bełt Battalion of the Home Army managed to occupy a portion of Jerusalem Avenue, between Marszałkowska Street and Bracka Street. In the first days of the uprising, to fortify their position, the Bełt and Kiliński Battalions built a barricade between buildings with numbers 17 (now no. 23) and 22, between Marszałkowska Street and Krucza Street. It became an important line of communications, as the only connection of partisans between the south and north portions of the city under their control. The barricade was under daily attacks and artillery and aerial bombardment from German forces, which attempted capture and destroy it. Despite of this, the partisans managed to keep their positions until the end of the uprising.

Following the outbreak of the uprising, German officers in the city received orders to raise it to the ground and executive the entire Polish population. The residents were expeled their houses, and the building were burned down section by section, starting from around the headquarters of Security Police. The inhabitants were rounded up on Szuch Avenue, where they were divided into groups. A portion, mostly women and children were expelled to the insurgent-controlled zones. Some people were also kept as forced labourers or hostages. The remaining people were set to be executed. The mass executions were first conducted at the Jordan garden at Bagatela Street, and later, in the ruins of the former building of General Inspector of the Armed Forces at 1 and 3 Ujazdów Avenue. Most of the people executed there were adult men and young boys deemed capable of fighting in the uprising, though in the first days, women and young children were also executed. The bodies were cremated in the building. After 5 August, the number of executions done in the area has decreased. Later most of people killed there were transported from other parts of the city, including Siekierki, Sielce, Solec, and Upper Mokotów. The executions lasted until early October. While the exact numbers remain unknown, it is estimated that between five and ten thousand people were executed there.

The uprising lasted until 3 October 1944. Following the capitulation, the population was evicted, and a large portion of the city was rased to the ground. This included South Downtown, which already suffered heavy destruction during the uprising. The neighbourhood and many of its historical buildings were rebuilt after the war.

=== Communist period ===
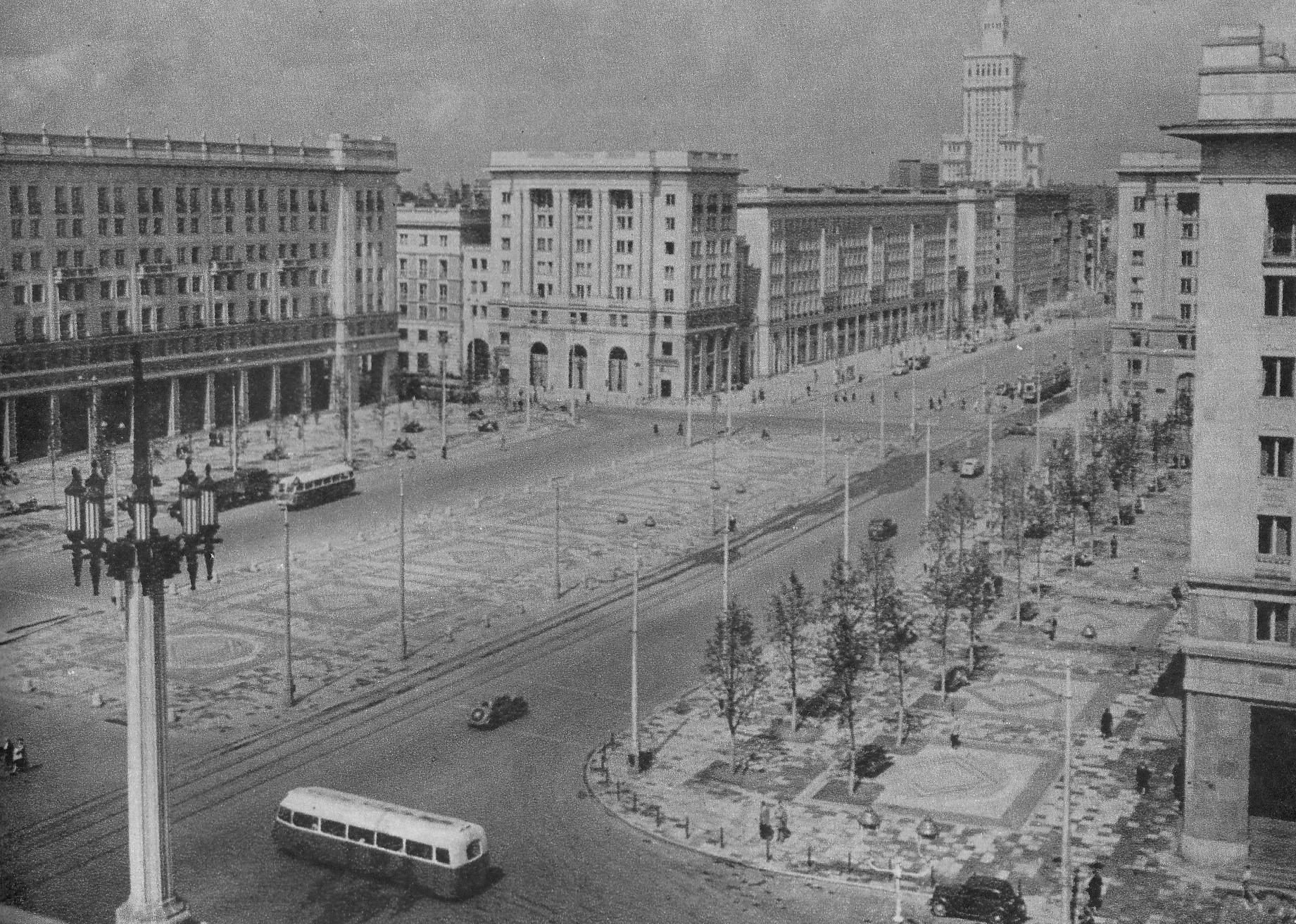
Constitution Square in the Marshal Residential District in the 1950s.

After the war, the city begun the process of rebuilding and replacing the demolished structures, including in South Downtown. Between 1946 and 1957, the Sts. Apostles Peter and Paul Church was rebuilt in the modernist style.

From 1950 to 1952, the Marshal Residential District, a new housing estate was developed in the area along Marszałkowska Street, from Wilcza Street to the north, and Union of Lublin Square to the south. It was designed in the socialist realistic style, with inspiration from the neoclassical architecture, and consisted of the multifamily residential buildings, constructed mostly in place of those destroyed during the Second World War. It also incorporated several surviving tenements, primary in its southern portion. Additionally, it also incorporated partially surviving architecture of Saviour Square, located in its southern section, including the rebuilt Church of the Holiest Saviour. Its northern portion was centred on then-built Constitution Square. Its area included the MDM Hotel, which, being opened in 1952, became the first hotel to be opened in Warsaw after the end of the Second World War. Between 1953 and 1957, the Marshal Residential District was expanded to the southeast, with the housing estate of Latawiec, with the style of its apartment buildings based on the Renaissance Revival architecture. It was developed between the People's Army Avenue, Marszałkowska Street, Mokotowska Street, Koszykowa Street, and Crossroads Square. Additionally, People's Army Avenue was constructed in 1952 to the south of the Marshal Residential District. It later became a part of the Baths Route, an expressway build between 1971 and 1974, which connects the city centre with the east side.

Between 15 and 19 December 1949, the Main Building of the Warsaw University of Technology hosted the congress during which the Polish Workers' Party and the Polish Socialist Party merged, forming the Polish United Workers' Party, a ruling socialist party in Poland. In 1951, the Banking and Finance Centre, originally known as the Party House, was opened at 6 and 12 New World Street, serving as the heaquaters of the part until 1989, including housing its Central Committee. From 1991 to 2000, the building housed the Warsaw Stock Exchange, until it moved to the Stock Exchange Center at 4 Książeca Street in 2000. The nearby campus of the Warsaw University of Technology, also began its program of further development, with new faculty buildings opening throughout the 1950s and 1960s

In 1955, the Central Culture Park was opened in the area of Warsaw Escarpment, later being renamed to the Marshal Edward Rydz-Śmigły Park in 1992. It was developed in place of the former Frascati Gardens, and also incorporated Na Książęcem Park. Additionally, throughout the 1970s and 1980s, the area of the former Mokotów Aerodrome, closed in 1947, was redeveloped into a large urban park, named the Mokotów Field. Its construction begun in 1977, and it was opened in sections, which were finished in 1983, 1986, and 1991.

In 1962, Supersam, the first supermarket store in Poland, was opened at 2 Puławska Street, next to Union of Lublin Square. It was considered a notable example of the modernist architecture in Poland. The building was demolished in 2006. In 1964, the skyscraper Riviera was opened at 12 Waryńskiego Street, as a dormitory for students of the Warsaw University of Technology. With the height from base to the roof messuring 67 m (219.8 ft.), and the total height of around 80 m (262.5 ft.), it was the second tallest building in the city, after the Palace of Culture and Science. It kept said title until 1969. In 1974, Novotel Warszawa Centrum (originally known as Hotel Forum) was opened at 94 and 98 Marszałkowska Street. It became the new second building in the city, with the total height of 111 m (364.1 ft.).

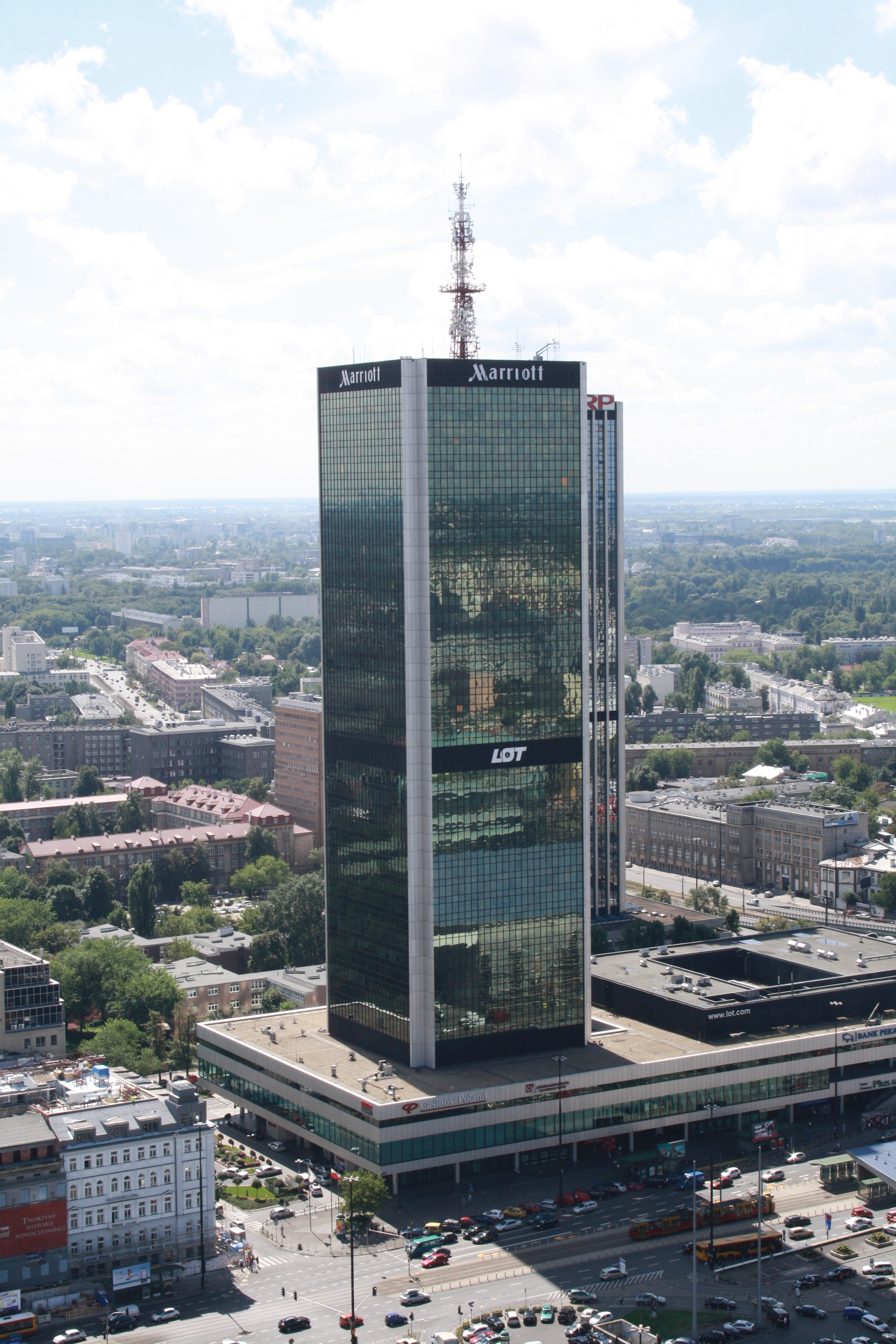
LIM Center, which was the second tallest skyscraper in Warsaw from 1989 to 1998.

In 1975, the complex of skyscrapers, multistorey stores and apartment buildings, named the West Wall, began being developed in the area of the intersection of Jerusalem Avenue and Chałubińskiego Street. It was scaled down and halted in 1989, leaving only its first two skyscrapers being finished, both of which were designed in the International Style. The first of them, located at 8 Chałubińskiego Street, was the Chałubińskiego 8, (originally known as Intraco II), which was finished in 1978, with the height from the base to the roof messuring 140 m (459.3 ft.), and the total height of 150 m (492.1 ft.). The second building, LIM Center, located at 65 and 79 Jerusalem Avenue, was finished in 1989, with the height from its base to the roof mesuring 140 m (459.3 ft.), and the total height of 170 m (557.7 ft.). Upon being finished, both buildings held respectively the title of the second highest building in the city, with the latter keeping it until 1998.

=== Democratic period ===
On 7 April 1995, the Politechnika metro station was opened at the intersection of Waryńskiego Street and People's Army Avenue, as part of the M1 line of the Warsaw Metro rapid transit underground system.

On 19 September 1996, the Downtown district was subdivided into nine City Information System areas, as part of a municipal standardised system of street signage, with South Downtown became one of the subdivisions.

On 8 July 2012, the Rainbow art installation, made by Julita Wójcik, was unveiled at Saviour Square. It consisted of a metal arch, covered in thousands of colourful plastic flowers. It became associated with the LGBTQ rights movement due to its resemblance to its symbol, the rainbow flag. The association, and its location near the Church of the Holiest Saviour, caused numerous controversies among, and protests by conservative groups, with numerous calls for its removal. The sculpture was set on fire during the night from 12 to 13 October 2012 by an arsonist. Between 2012 and 2014, the installation was set on fire by arsonists four more times, including by a large group of far-right rioters during the celebrations of the National Independence Day of Poland on 11 November 2013. It was rebuilt each time, and was permanently removed by the city on 27 August 2015.

In 2013, the skyscraper Plac Unii was opened at 2 Puławska Street near Union of Lublin Square. It has 22 stories, with the total height of 90 m, and houses offices and a shopping mall. It was built in place of the former Supersam supermarket. The building is located within the Mokotów district, at the boundary with South Downtown.

In 2016, the new building of the Koszyki Hall, an indoor market and food hall, was opened at 61 and 63 Koszykowa Street, replacing the former structure which was demolished in 2009. The fragments of the previous hall, including its arcades were preserved and incorporated into the new building.

On 10 March 2016 the Downtown district was administratively subdivided into nine neighbourhoods, each governed by an elected neighbourhood council. The area of South Downtown included the neighbourhoods of Koszyki, Krucza, Oleandrów, and Powiśle-Solec.

== Housing and economy ==
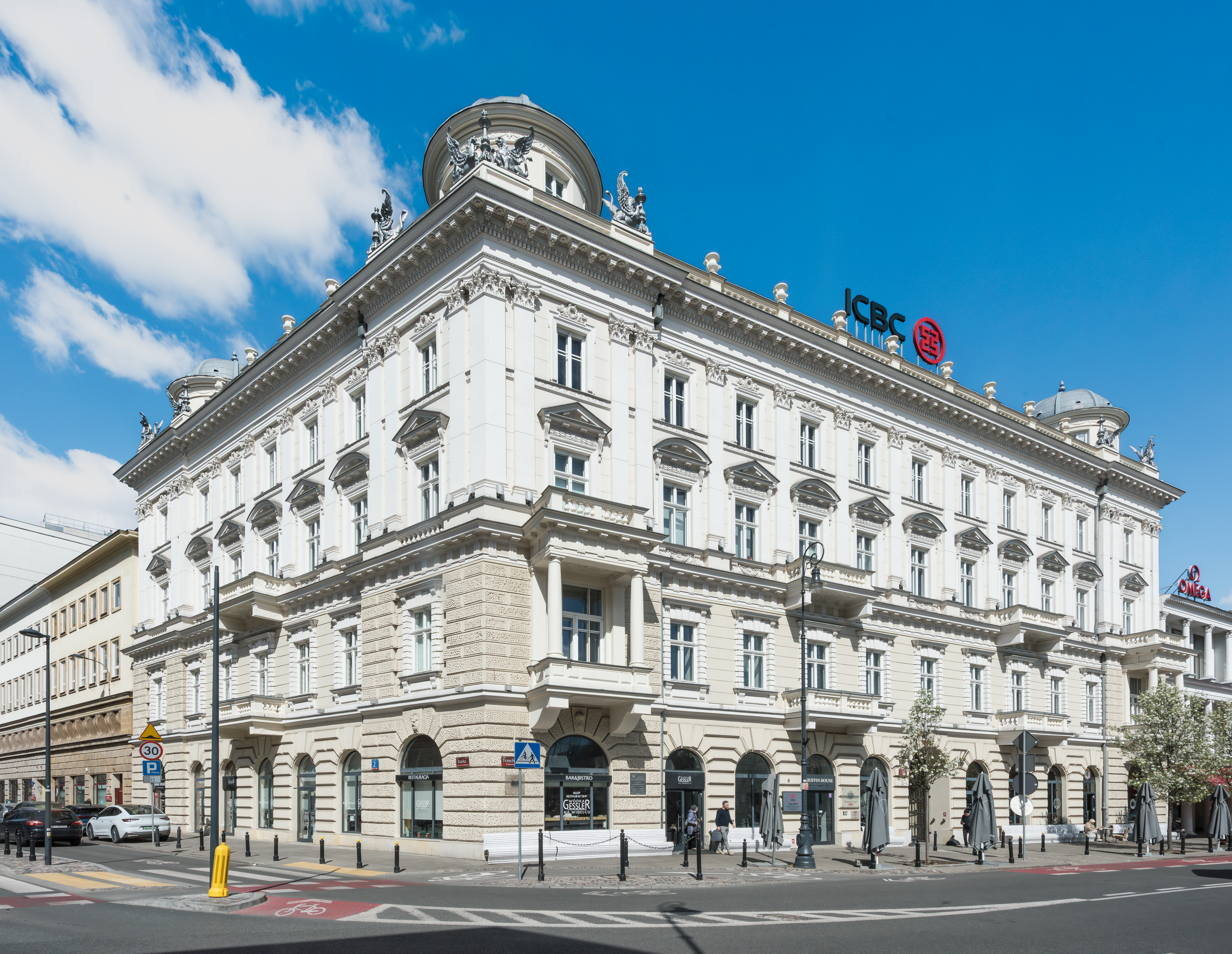
The Tenement of the Griffins at Three Crosses Square, a historic Renaissance Revival tenement dating to 1886.

South Downtown is predominantly a mid-rise residential area, populated with tenements and apartment buildings. Prominent examples of these are the housing estates of the Marshal Residential District, centred on Marszałkowska Street between Constitution and Saviour Squares, and Latawiec, situated between Crossroads Square, People's Army Avenue, and Koszykowa, Marszałkowska, and Mokotowska Streets. There are also numerous historical tenements in the area, some dating to the late 19th and early 20th centuries, including Domański Tenement, Giants Tenement, Griffins Tenement, Kacperski Tenement, and Rakman Tenement.

The area also includes numerous office buildings such as Banking and Finance Centre, Focus, International Business Center, Norway House, Ufficio Primo, and Zebra Tower. The neighbourhood also houses the Warsaw Stock Exchange the largest stock exchange in Central and Eastern Europe. Skyscrapers in the area include Novotel Warszawa Centrum, Riviera, LIM Center, and Chałubińskiego 8. The latter two, predominately dedicated to the office space, are the two tallest buildings in the neighbourhood, with the total heights of 150 m (492.1 ft.) and 170 m (557.7 ft.), respectively, and each having the architectural height of 140 m (459.3 ft.).

South Downtown also includes the Koszyki Hall, an indoor market and food hall, and the MDM Hotel, a historic neoclassical hotel building.

== Higher education and science ==
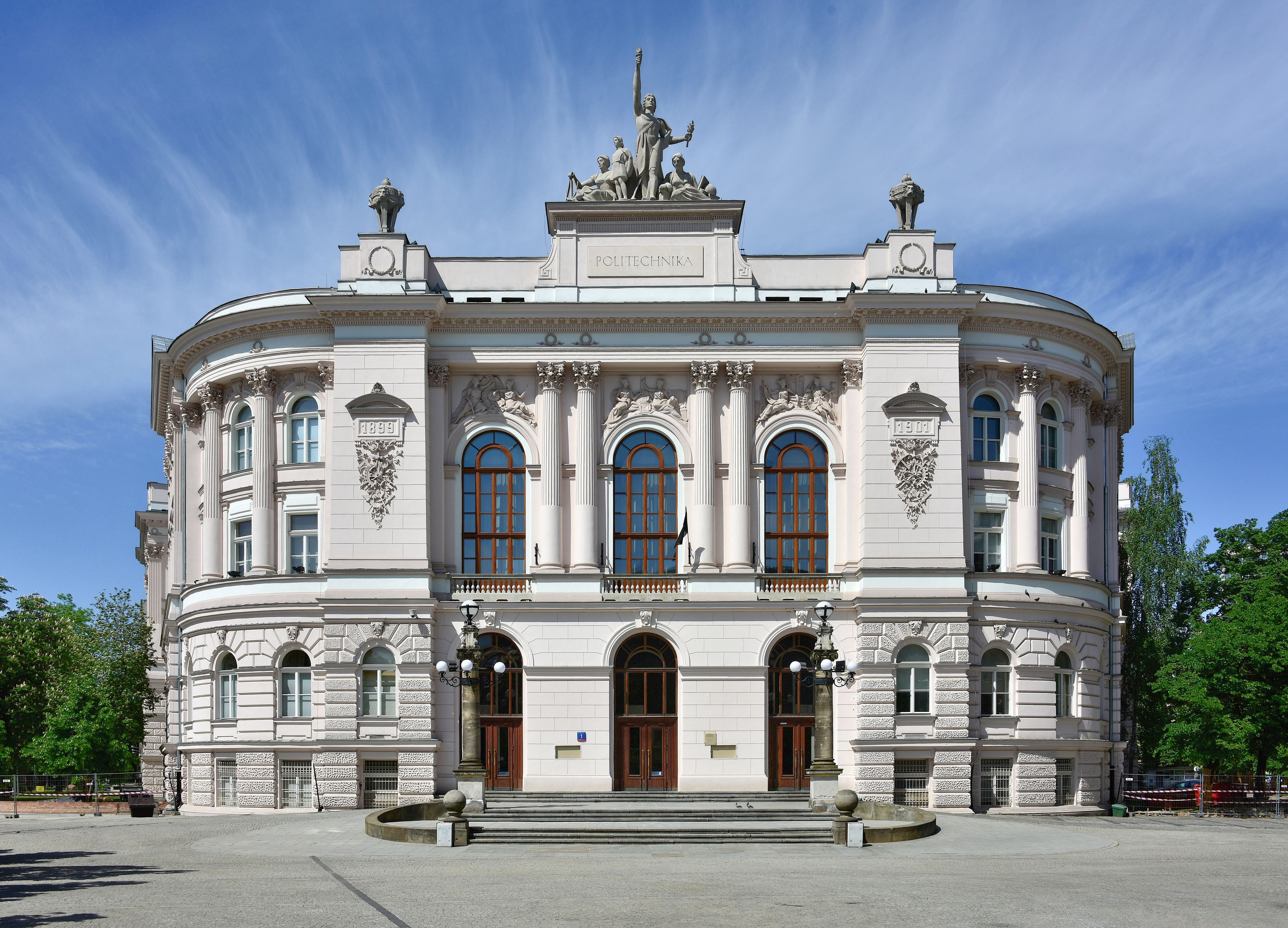
The Main Building of the Warsaw University of Technology.

South Downtown includes the main campus of the Warsaw University of Technology. Its Main Building is located at 1 Polytechnic Square, while most of the faculty buildings are placed in a section between Independence Avenue and Koszykowa, Noakowskiego, and Nowowiejska Streets. Additionally, the Faculty of Architecture is located at 55 Koszykowa Street, and the Faculty of Chemistry at 3 Noakowskiego Street. The National Information Processing Institute of the Ministry of Science and Higher Education is also present in the neighbourhood, at 188B Independence Avenue.

The Central Transport Library, a research and librarian institution of the Ministry of Infrastructure, is also housed at 4 and 6 Chałubińskiego Street.

== Culture ==
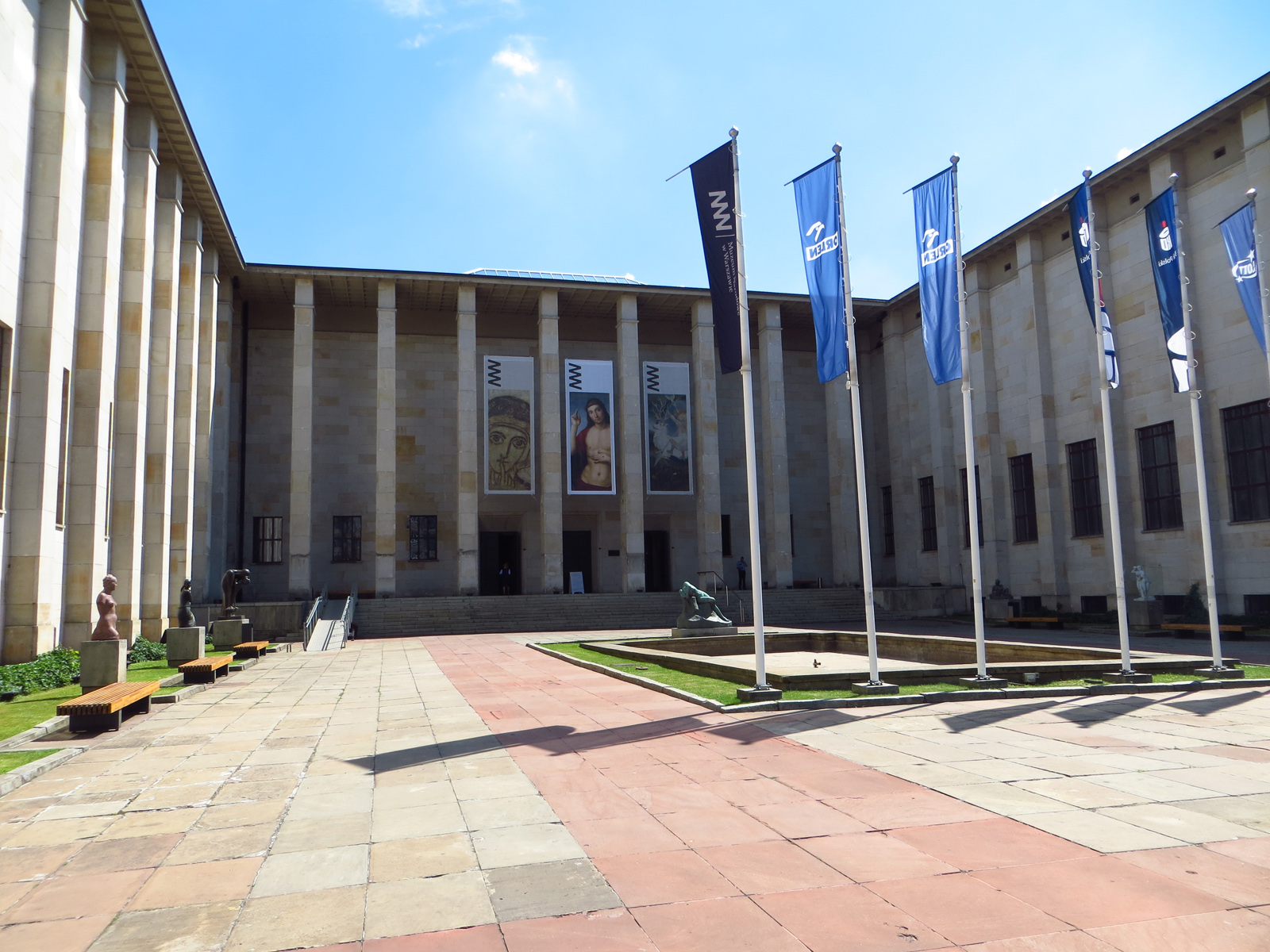
The courtyard of the Warsaw National Museum.

The Warsaw National Museum, the largest museum in the city and one of the largest in the country is located at 3 Jerusalem Avenue in South Downtown. The neighbourhood also includes the Mausoleum of Struggle and Martyrdom, the Museum of the Earth of the Polish Academy of Sciences, the Museum of Life in the Polish People's Republic, and the Warsaw University of Technology Museum.

Additionally, the area includes two branches of the Warsaw Rising Museum. This includes the Warsaw Fotoplastikon, a stereoscopic device based on the Kaiserpanorama system, housed at 51 Jerusalem Avenue, which has been operating at the location since 1905, and the Security Office Prison Cells, located in the basement of the Ministry of Justice building at 11 Ujazdów Avenue, which documents the prison operated there by the Ministry of Public Security from 1945 to 1954.

South Downtown features several theaters, including Contemporary Theatre, Roma Musical Theatre, Studio Buffo, and TR Warszawa. Additionally, Kino Luna, a historic cinema operating since 1962, located at 28 Marszałkowska Street.

The neighbourhood has numerous monuments and memorials such as the Memorial to the Polish Aviators Fallen Between 1939 and 1945, the Monument to the Millennium of the Polish Cavalry, and the Monument to the Polish Underground State and Home Army. It also features art installations, such as Greetings from Jerusalem Avenue, a 2002 artwork by Joanna Rajkowska, in form of an artificial date palm on Charles de Gaulle Roundabout.

== Parks and recreation ==
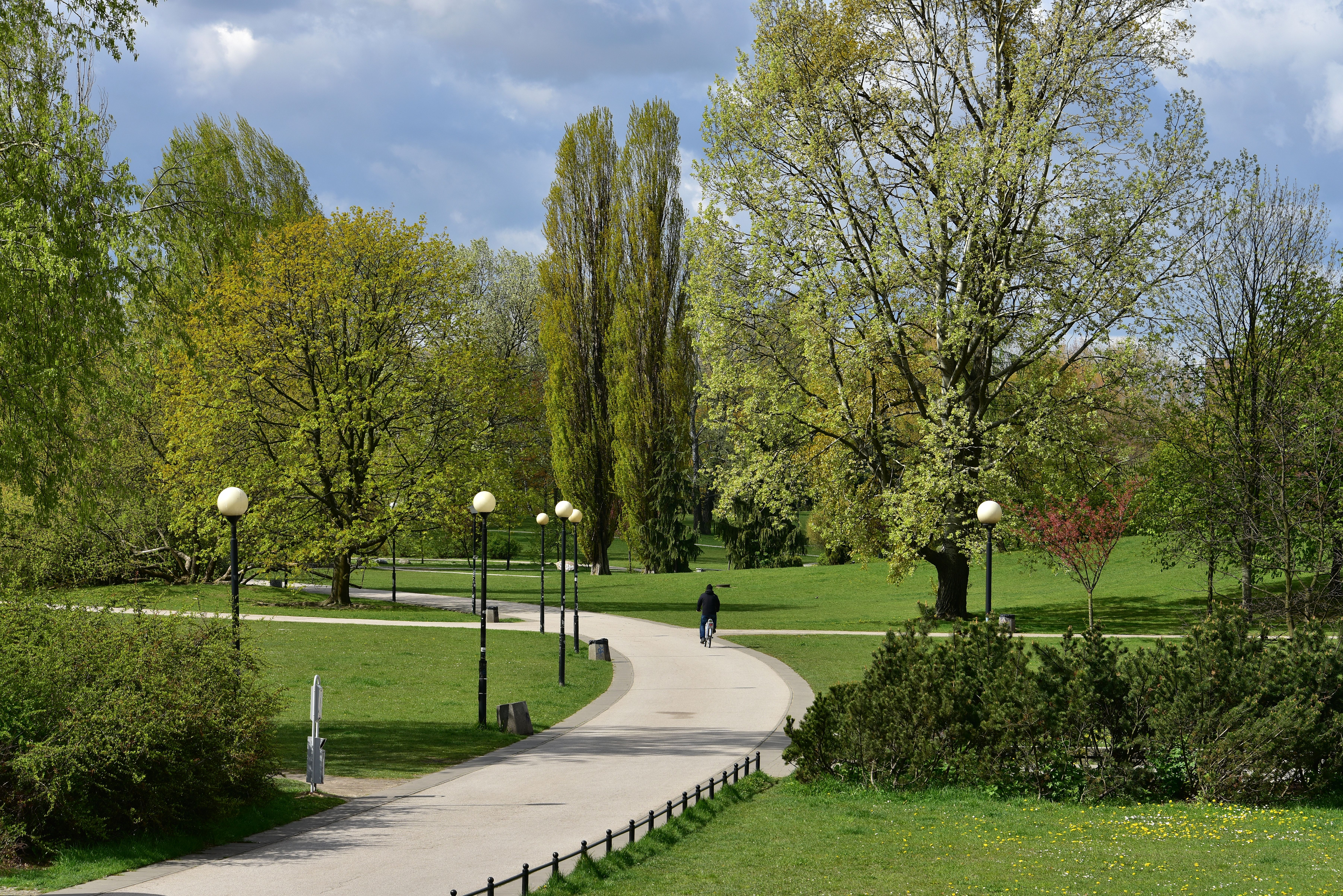
The Mokotów Field near Polish Cavalry Roundabout.

In the southwestern portion of the neighbourhood, The Marshal Józef Piłsudski Park, located in the southwestern portion of the neighbourhood, between People's Army Avenue, Waryńskiego Street, Batorego Street, and Independence Avenue, forms a part of the Mokotów Field, one of the largest park complexes in the city. In the northwest, in the area of the Warsaw Escarpment, the neighbourhood also includes the western portion of the Marshal Edward Rydz-Śmigły Park, located between Jerusalem Avenue and Górnośląska Street. This includes its portion between Jerusalem Avenue and Książęca Street, known as the Na Książęcem Park. Additionally, the Swiss Valley Park, a small historic park is located between Róż Avenue, Chopina Street, and Ujazdów Avenue.

The neighborhood also has six main urban squares: Constitution Square, Crossroads Square, Polytechnic Square, Saviour Square, Three Crosses Square, Union of Lublin Square.

== Transportation ==
South Downtown is served by the Politechnika station of the M1 line of the Warsaw Metro underground rapid transit system, located at the intersection of Waryńskiego Street and People's Army Avenue. Additionally, the neighbourhood is crossed through on the west–east axis by People's Army Avenue, which forms a part of the Baths Route, an expressway which connects the city centre with the east side.

== Religion ==
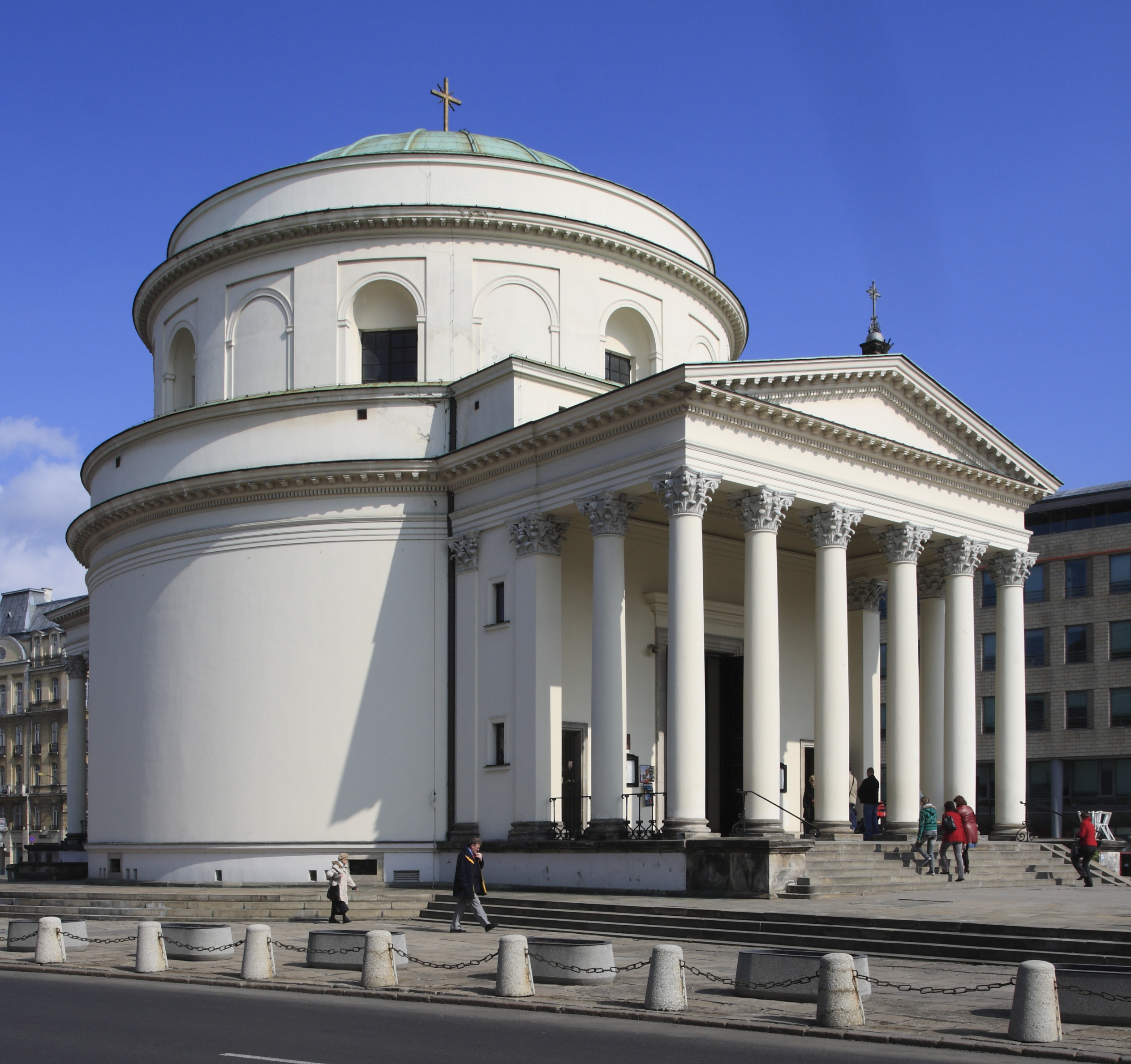
The St. Alexander Church.

The neighbourhood features three Roman Catholic parish churches. This includes the Church of the Holiest Saviour at 1 Saviour Square, dating to 1927, the St. Alexander Church on Three Crosses Squares, dating to 1825, and the Sts. Apostles Peter and Paul Church, at 18 Plater Street, dating to 1957. Other notable Roman Catholic buildings include the Chapel of Our Lady of Perpetual Help on 7 Wilcza Street, and the St. Barbara Chapel at 68 Wspólna Street. The latter dates to 1782. The neighbourhood also includes the Chapel of the Divine Mercy of the Polish-Catholic Church of the Republic of Poland, located at 31 Wilcza Street.

== Government ==
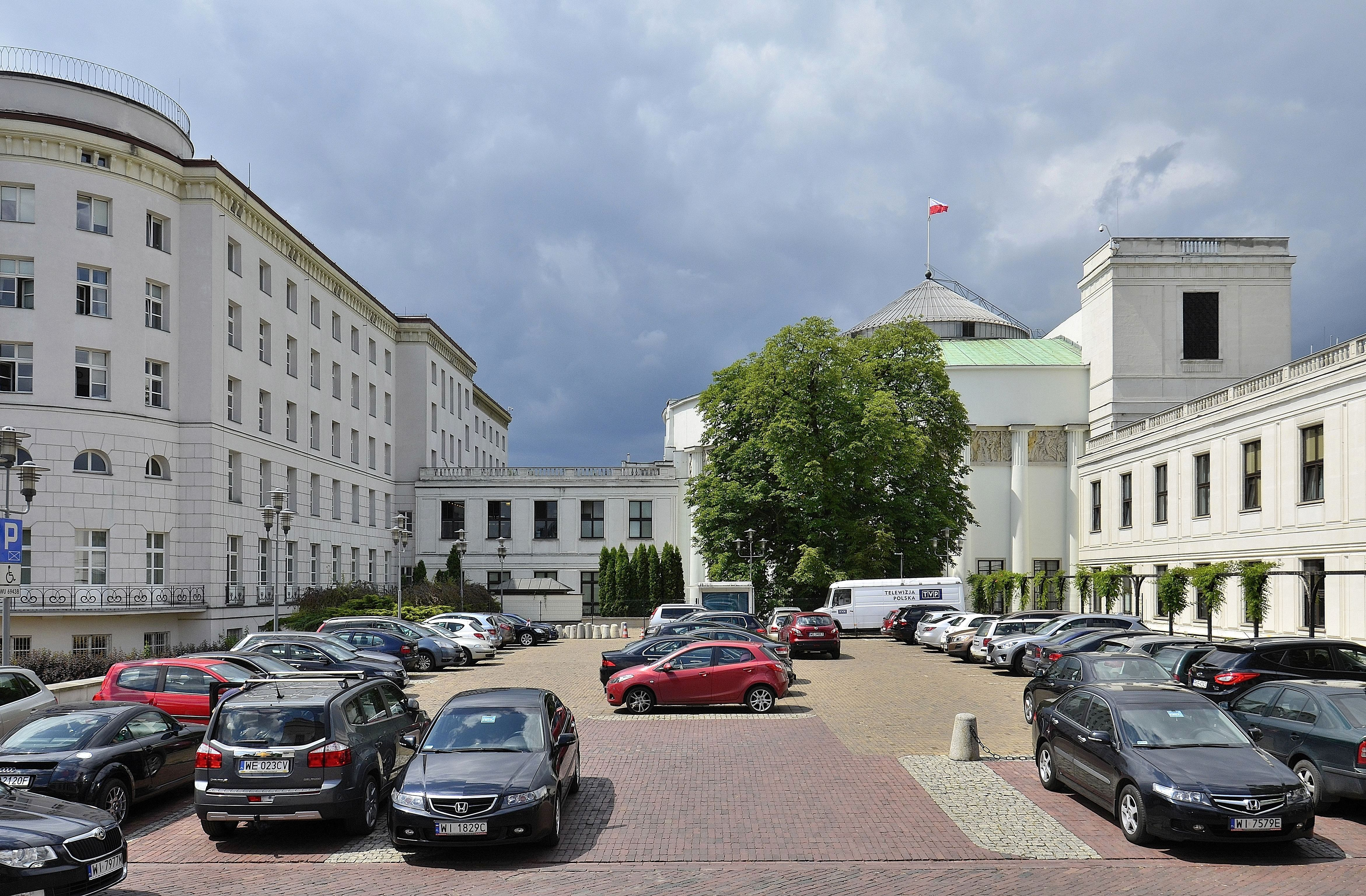
The Sejm and Senate Complex, which houses the Parliament of Poland.

The complex which houses the Sejm and Senate, the lower and upper houses of the Parliament of Poland is located in South Downtown, at 4, 6 and 8 Wiejska Street. The neighbourhood also hosts the headquarters of numerous other government agencies, including:

- the Agricultural Social Insurance Fund;
- the Central Statistical Office;
- the Financial Supervision Authority;
- the Ministry of Agriculture and Rural Development;
- the Ministry of Economic Development and Technology;
- the Ministry of Foreign Affairs;
- the Ministry of Funds and Regional Policy;
- the Ministry of Infrastructure;
- the Ministry of Justice;
- the Ministry of National Education;
- the Ministry of Science and Higher Education;
- the National Development Bank;
- the Patent Office of the Republic of Poland;
- and the Warsaw Regional Court.

South Downtown also houses numerous foreign embassies, including those of Canada, France, and the United States, among others.

== Boundaries and subdivisions ==
South Downtown is a City Information System area, a subdivision of the municipal standardised system of street signage in Warsaw. It is located in the southwestern portion of the Downtown district. Its boundaries are approximately determined to the north by Jerusalem Avenue; to the east by Ujazdów Avenue, Piękna Street, Górnośląska Street, Szuch Avenue, and the peaks of the Warsaw Escarpment; to the south by Batorego Street, Boya-Żeleńskiego Street, and around Union of Lublin Square; and to the west by Independence Avenue, and Chałubińskiego Street.

It borders the CIS areas of Mirów to the north-west, North Downtown to the north, Powiśle to the north-east, Solec to the east, Ujazdów to the south-east, Old Mokotów to the south, and Filtry to the west. Its southern and western boundaries form part of the border of the Downtown district, bordering Mokotów to the south, and Wola and Ochota to the west.

The Downtown district is also administratively subdivided into nine neighbourhoods, each governed by an elected neighbourhood council. The South Downtown area includes the neighbourhoods of Koszyki, Krucza, Oleandrów, and Powiśle-Solec.
