= Zaremba–Piorun Battalion Monument =

Monument in Warsaw, Poland

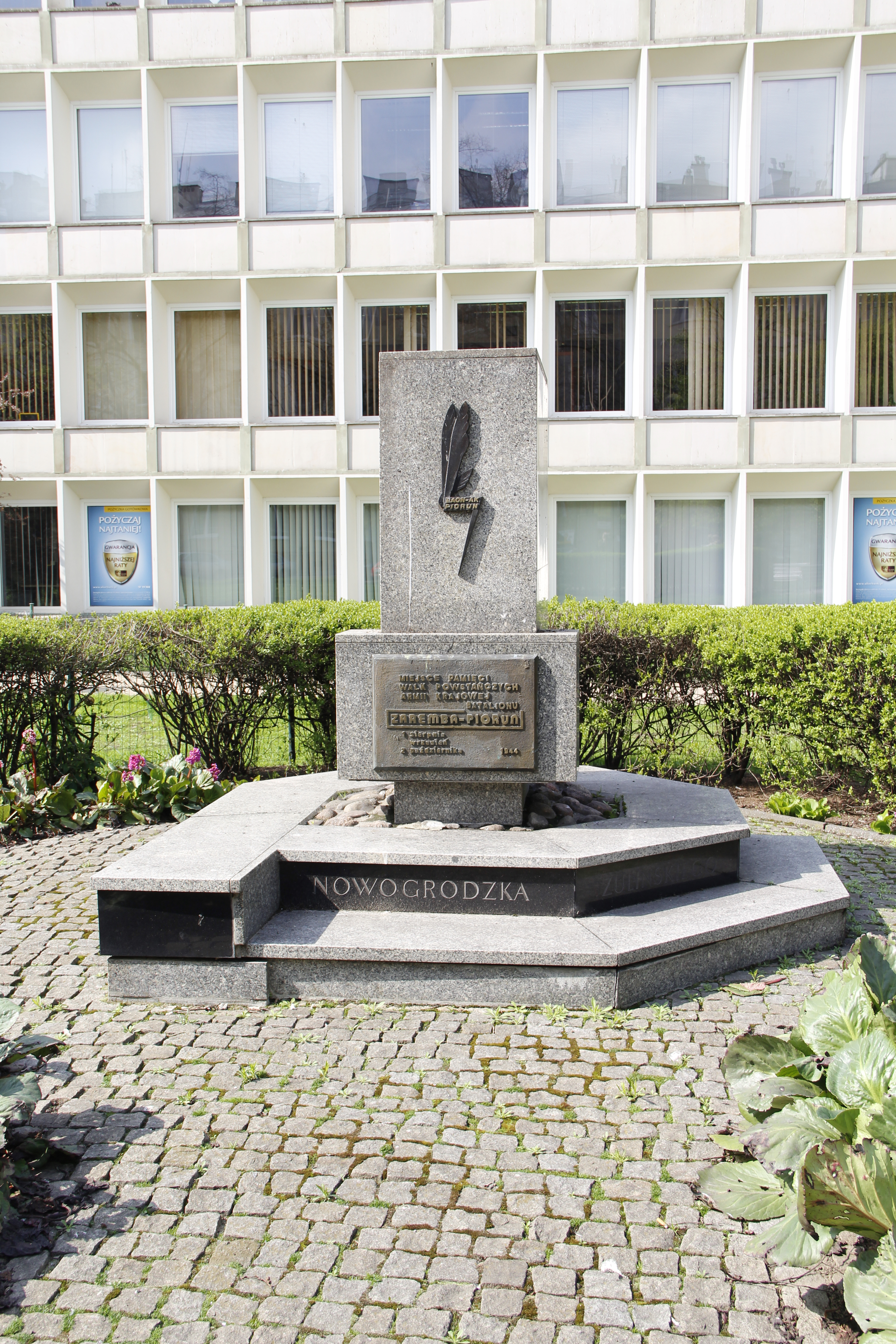
- The monument in 2013.
- Interactive map of Zaremba–Piorun Battalion Monument
- Location: Zaremba–Piorun Battalion of the Home Army Square, Downtown, Warsaw, Poland
- Coordinates: 52.226824°N 21.010478°E
- Designer: Julian Pilichowski
- Type: Sculpture
- Opening date: 15 August 1990
- Dedicated to: Zaremba–Piorun Battalion

The Zaremba–Piorun Battalion Monument (Polish: Pomnik batalionu „Zaremba-Piorun”) is a memorial sculpture in Warsaw, Poland, at the corner of Poznańska and Wspólna Streets, within the South Downtown neighbourhood. Its dedicated to the soldiers of the Zaremba–Piorun Battalion, a Polish resistance group active during the Warsaw Uprising in 1944. It was designed by its member, Julian Pilichowski, and unveiled on 15 August 1990. It is placed at the Zaremba–Piorun Battalion of the Home Army Square (Polish: Skwer Batalionu AK „Zaremba-Piorun”).

== History ==
The monument was dedicated to the soldiers of the Zaremba–Piorun Battalion, a group of Polish resistance active during the Warsaw Uprising in 1944. It was designed by its member, Julian Pilichowski, and unveiled on 15 August 1990, in ma small garden square, at the corner of Poznańska and Wspólna Streets. In December 1993, the location was named the Zaremba–Piorun Battalion Square.

== Design ==
The monument has a form of a rectangular cuboid block of stone, featuring the emblem of the battalion, in shape of a bolt, with its top stylised to look like fethers. Below it is installed a commemorative plaque with the following inscription:

Polish inscription

Miejsce pamięci walk powstańczych Armii Krajowej batalionu Zaremba-Piorun
1 sierpnia
wrzescień
2 października
1944

Translation:
English translation

The memorial place of the battles of the Zaremba–Piorun Battalion of the Home Army
1 August
September
2 October
1944
