= Nowogrodzka =

The map of the Warsaw agglomeration in the 18th century, with Nowogrodzka being marked with number 23.

Nowogrodzka (Polish: [nɔ.vɔˈɡrɔt͡s.ka]), originally known as Nowy Gród (Polish: [ˈnɔ.vɘ̟ ˈɡrut]), was a suburban town (jurydyka) near the town of Old Warsaw, and a part of Warsaw agglomeration. It was established in 1767, centered on the Nowogrodzka Street, and was incorporated into the city of Warsaw in 1974. Currently, its area is divided between districts of Śródmieście (Śródmieście Południowe) and Ochota (Filtry).

== History ==
Nowy Gród (lit. New Town, New Settlement), later known as Nowogrodzka, was established in 1767, on the land belonging to the Church of the Holy Spirit, and later to the Holy Cross Church.

Nowogrodzka was suburban town in the Warsaw agglomeration, outside the administrative boundaries of Old Warsaw and New Warsaw. It legally functioned as the jurydyka, a suburban town, established with royal decree, independent from Warsaw, including free from paying taxes and following its laws.

In 1770, the road around which the settlement was settled, was named the Nowogrodzka Street.

In 1791, in accordance to the Free Royal Cities Act, it was decided to combine Nowogrodzka, together with other suburban towns, as well as towns of Old Warsaw, and New Warsaw, into a singular entity, forming the city of Warsaw. The execution of the act was blocked by the Targowica Confederation, which delayed the unification to 1794.
