= Tenement of the Griffins =

Historic tenement house in Warsaw, Poland

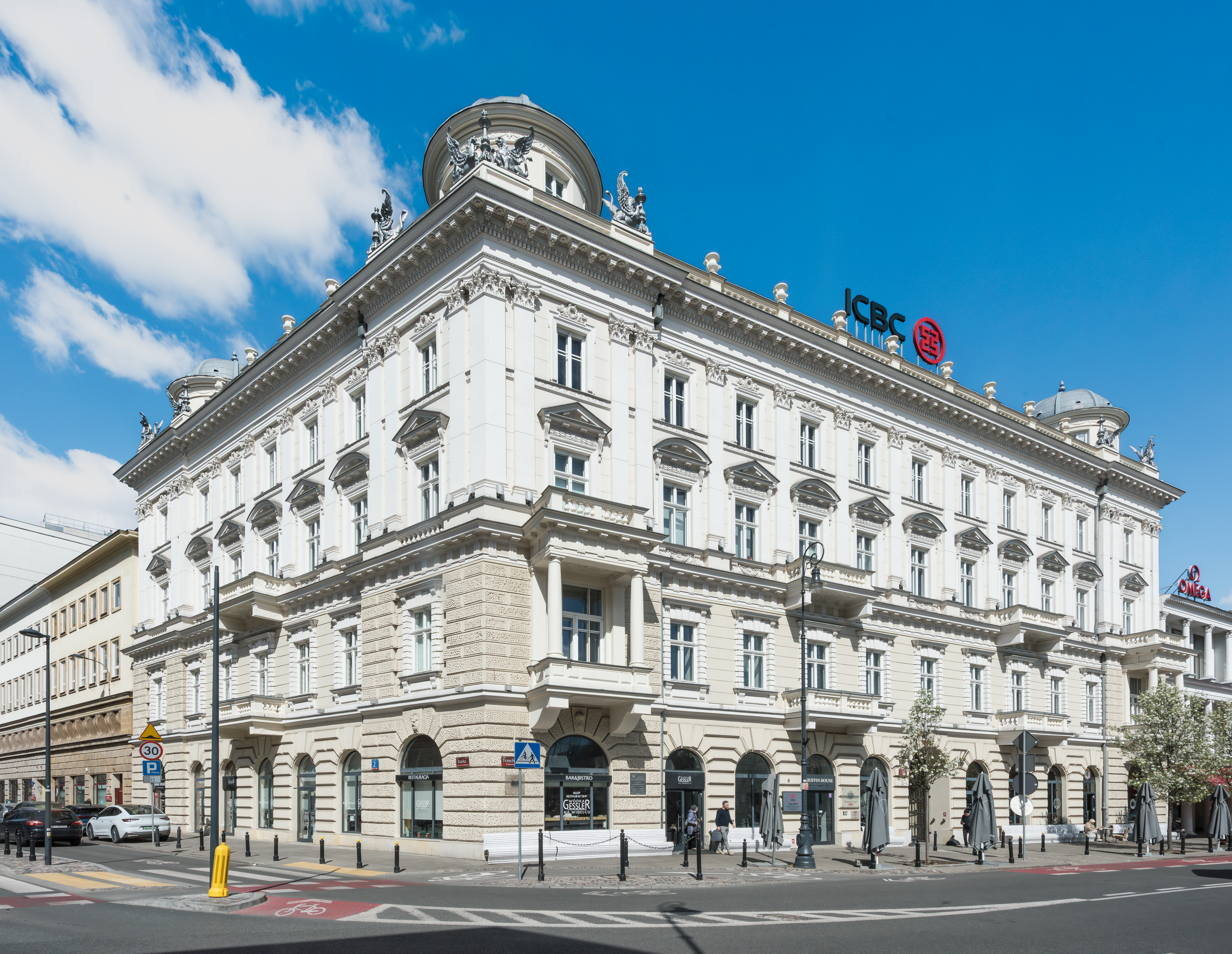
- The building in 2025.
- Interactive map of the Tenement of the Griffins area

General information
- Type: Tenement house
- Architectural style: Renaissance Revival
- Location: Downtown, Warsaw, Poland, 18 Three Crosses Square
- Coordinates: 52°13′47.13″N 21°01′15.94″E
- Construction started: 1884
- Completed: 1886

Technical details
- Floor count: 5

Design and construction
- Architect: Józef Huss
- Developer: Julian Fuchs

The Tenement of the Griffins (Polish: Kamienica Pod Gryfami) is a Renaissance Revival tenement house in Warsaw, Poland, at 18 Three Crosses Square, within the South Downtown neighbourhood. It designed by Józef Huss, and opened in 1886. Currently, it is used as an office building.

== History ==
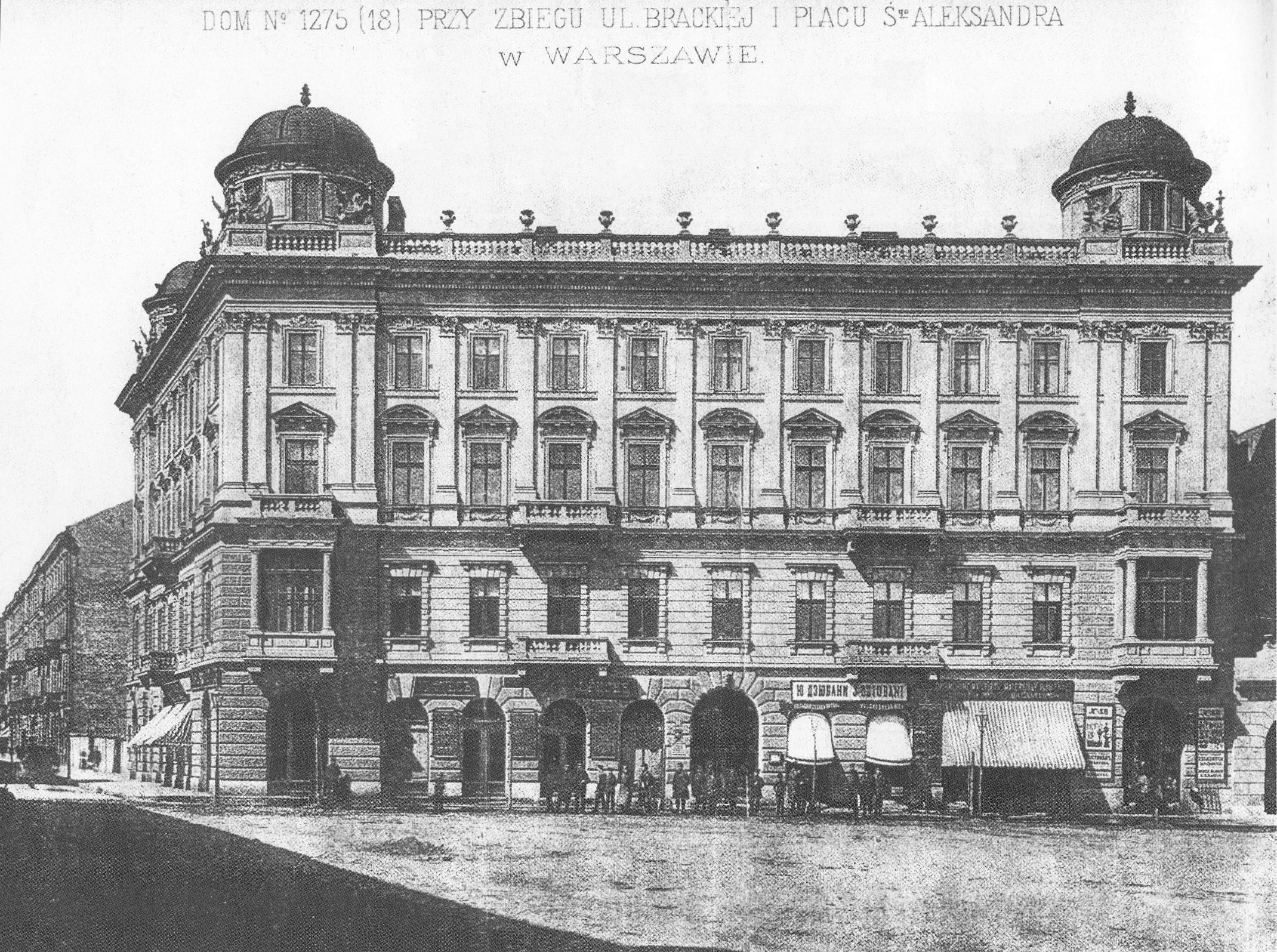
The building around 1886.

The building was designed by Józef Huss, and constructed between 1884 and 1886 for the Fuchs family. The corners of the building included domes on the roof, inspired by the Rabbit House in Warsaw, and statues of griffins, inspired by the Werder Market House in Berlin. The Fuchs family used the luxury apartments at the first floor as their residence, while renting the rest of the building. Later, the tenement house was bought by the Classen family.

In 1918, in the building was opened the Private All-Female Middle and High School, run by Anna Jakubowska. It was moved to a different location during the Second World War, and was not reopen after the end of the conflict. In 1983, Jakubowska was commemorated with a plaque unveiled at a forntal façade of the tenement house.

In 1944, the building caught on fire and was partially destroyed. It was restored in the 1950s, without its domes and surrounding them decorations, and with only two statues of griffins surviving. It became headquarters of the company Paged. In 1955, it housed the Hungarian cultural centre, known as the Liszt Institute.

In 1965, the tenement house was entered into the heritage list.

The tenement house was renovated between 2005 and 2006. This included restoring its domes, façade decorations, and statues of griffins, as well as adding an additional storey at the top, incorporated into a gambrel roof. Currently, it is used as an office building. It was again renovated in 2015.

== Architecture ==
The tenement house has a Renaissance Revival façade, with richly decorated corners, which include domes at the top, and statues of griffins. It has 5 storeys, including a final floor, incorporated into a gambrel roof. It is used as an office building. Its frontal façade includes a commemorative plaque to Anna Jakubowska, a 19th- and 20th-century teacher and activist.

== Gallery ==
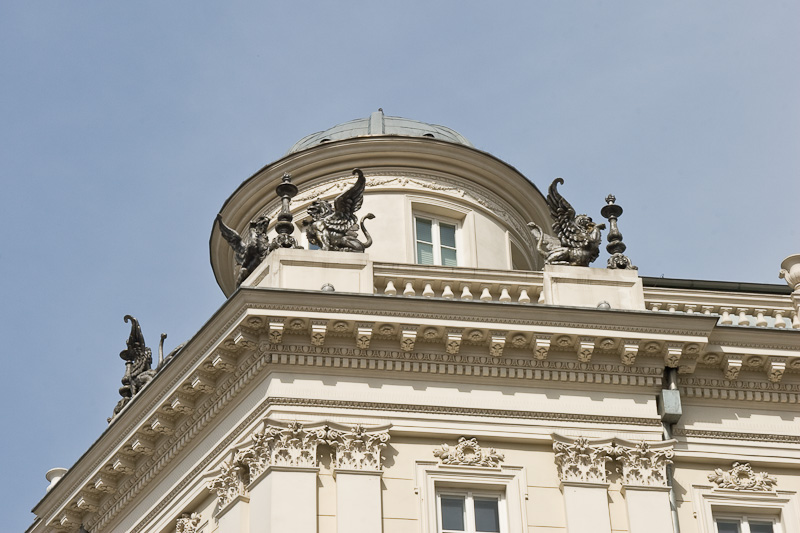
Statues of griffins on the roof.

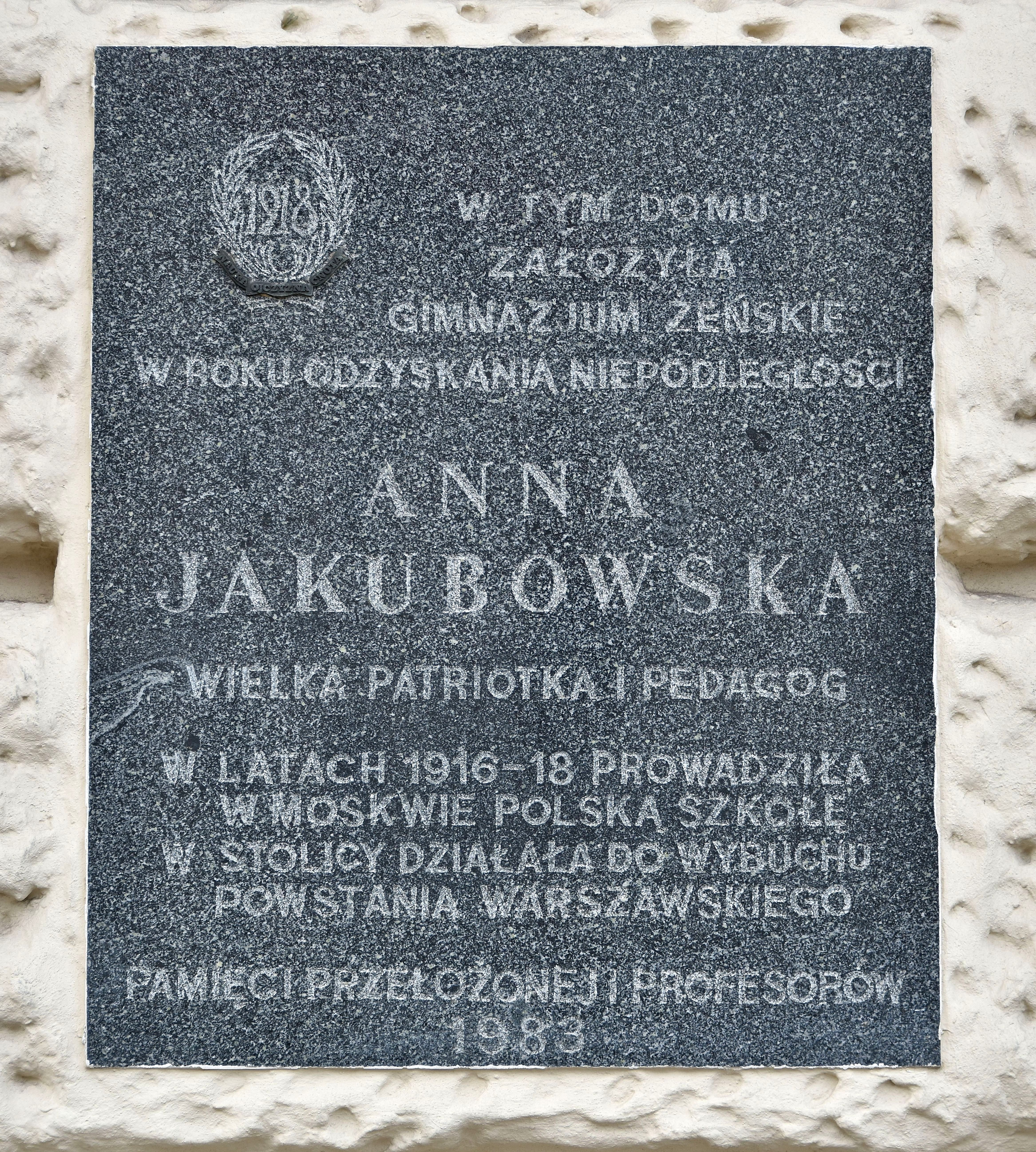
Commemorative plaque dedicated to Anna Jakubowska.
