= Bielino, Warsaw =

Former suburban town in Poland

The map of the Warsaw agglomeration in the 18th century, with Bielino being marked with numbers 16 and 24.

Bielino (Polish: [bjɛˈli.nɔ]) was a suburban town (jurydyka) near the town of Old Warsaw, and a part of Warsaw agglomeration. It was established in 1730, centered in the area of modern Jan Henryk Dąbrowski Square, Marszałkowska Street, and Wilcza Street. It was incorporated into the city of Warsaw in 1974. Currently, its area is located within the district of Śródmieście.

== History ==
Prior to 1730, in the area was built the Bielińskis Palace, designed by architect Józef Fontana, and commissioned by Franciszek Bieliński, the Grand Crown Marshal of the Crown of the Kingdom of Poland. The palace was eventually torn down in 1895.

Bielino was established in 1757 by Franciszek Bieliński, the Grand Crown Marshal of the Crown of the Kingdom of Poland. It was named after his surname.

Bielino was a suburban town in the Warsaw agglomeration, outside the administrative boundaries of Old Warsaw and New Warsaw. It legally functioned as the jurydyka, a suburban town, established with royal decree, independent from Warsaw, including from paying taxes and following its laws.

The town was divided into two parts, in form of stripes of land, both located about 1 km (0.62 miles) apart from each other. The northern part, located in the area of modern Jan Henryk Dąbrowski Square, was established in 1757, and contained the town hall, located at the Zielna Street (then known as Zielona Street). The southern portion was located in the area of modern Wilcza Street, and was established in 1766.

Bielino was designed with the grid plan. The main street of the town, which was 26 metre wide (85.3 feet), was Marszałkowska Street (until 1770 known as Bielińska Street). It went from the Królewska Street to the Sienna Street.

In 1791, in accordance to the Free Royal Cities Act, it was decided to combine Nowogrodzka, together with other suburban towns, as well as towns of Old Warsaw, and New Warsaw, into a singular entity, forming the city of Warsaw. The execution of the act was blocked by the Targowica Confederation, which delayed the unification to 1794.
