= International Business Center (Warsaw) =

Skyscraper in Warsaw, Poland

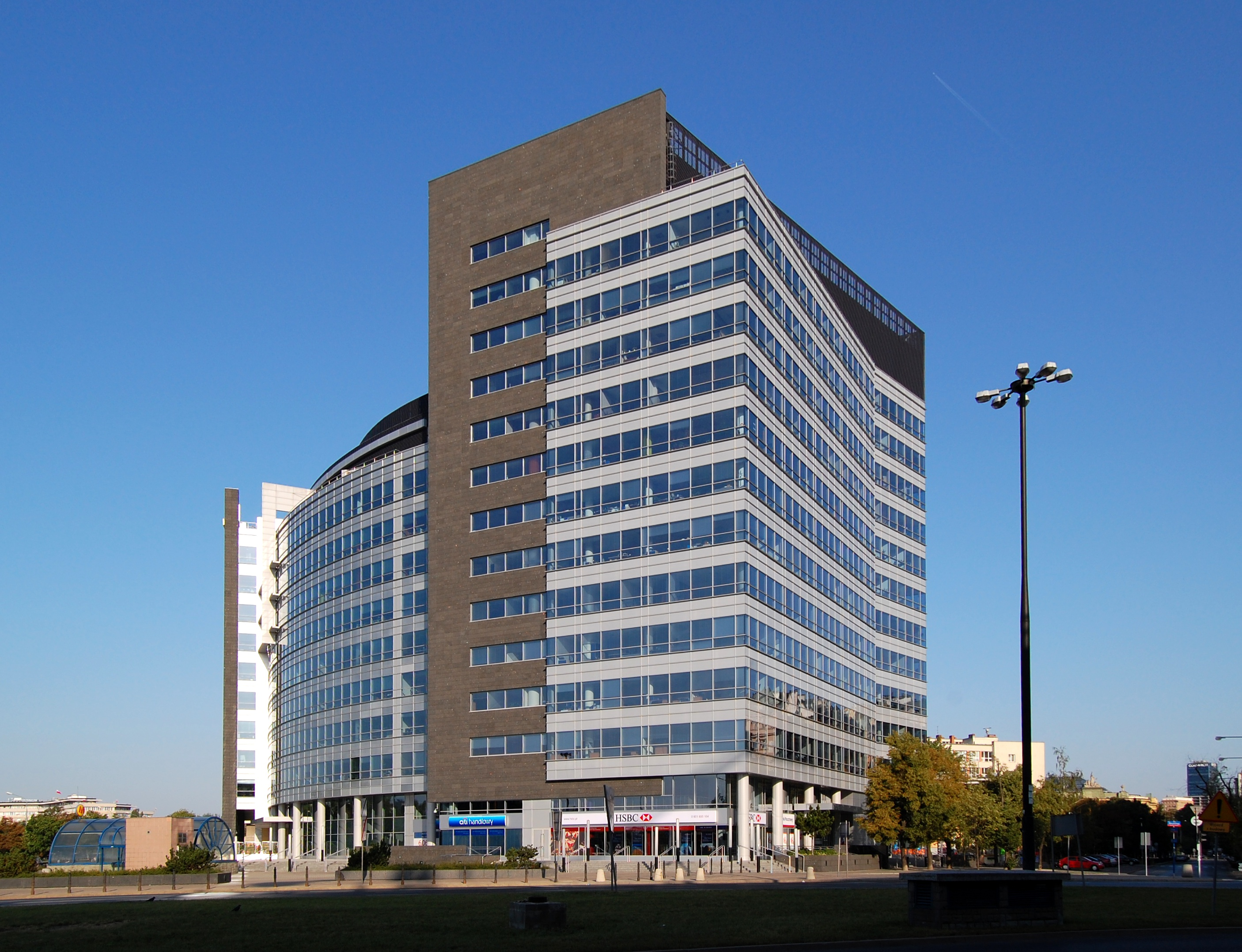
- The International Business Center in 2009.
- Interactive map of the International Business Center area

General information
- Type: Office building
- Location: Warsaw, Poland, 14 People's Army Avenue
- Coordinates: 52°13′05″N 21°00′50″E
- Construction started: 2001 (first building); 2006 (second building)
- Completed: 2007

Height
- Tip: 59 m

Technical details
- Floor count: 13
- Floor area: 36,300 m²

Design and construction
- Architecture firm: Denton Corker Marshall
- Developer: GLL Real Estate Partners

The International Business Center (IBC) is an office building complex in Warsaw, Poland, located in the district of Downtown, at 14 People's Army Avenue. It consists of two connected buildings, the IBC I and IBC II. The complex was opened in 2007.

== History ==
The International Business Center is a complex of two connected office buildings. The construction of the first building, the IBC I, begun in March 2002, and finished in April 2007. The construction of the second building, the IMC II lasted from 2006 to 2007. Both buildings were designed by Denton Corker Marshall architectural firm, and its construction was financed by GLL Real Estate Partners.

In 2008, the IBC II received the Best Office Project Award at The Cepif & International Herald Tribune CEE Best Office Awards.

== Characteristics ==
The International Business Center is a complex of two connected office buildings, the IBC I and IBC II. It is located at 14 People's Army Avenue, near Jazdy Polskiej Roundabout, and between Polna Street, and Łazienkowska Thoroughfare.

The complex has 13 storeys, with the height of 59 m, and with the total floor area of 36,300 m^{2}.
