= Riviera (Warsaw) =

Skyscraper in Warsaw, Poland

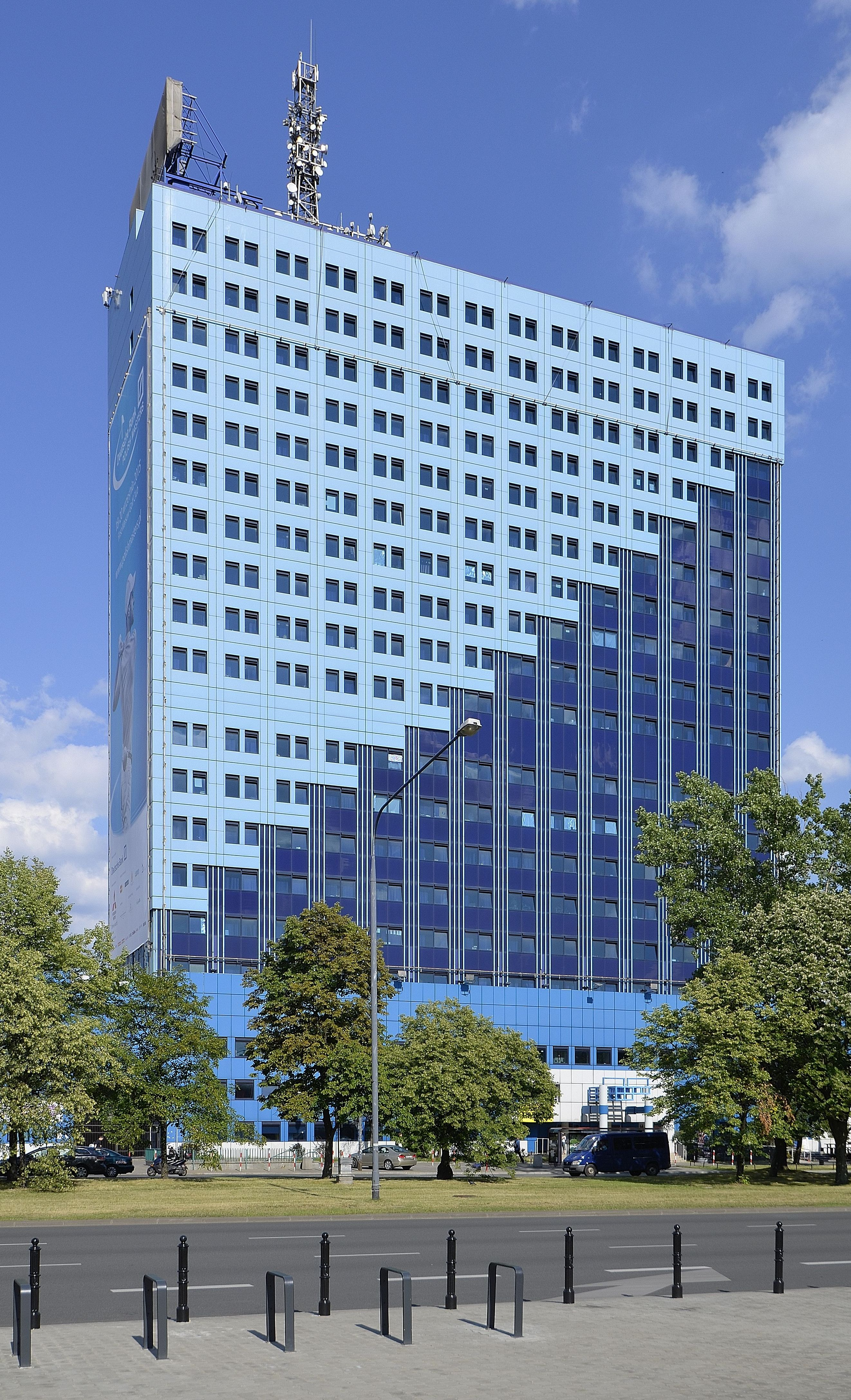
- Riviera in 2015.
- Interactive map of the Riviera area

General information
- Location: Warsaw, Poland, 12 Waryńskiego Street
- Coordinates: 52°12′58.6″N 21°00′57.8″E
- Construction started: 1962
- Completed: 1964

Height
- Architectural: 80 m
- Roof: c. 67 m

Technical details
- Floor count: 21

Design and construction
- Architects: Józef Bubicz; Czesław Molenda; Kazimierz Thor

The Riviera Dormitory (Polish: Dom Studencki „Riviera”, DS Riviera), also simply known as Riviera, is a skyscraper in Warsaw, Poland, located at 12 Waryńskiego Street. Its a student dormitory of the Warsaw University of Technology. The building was opened in 1964.

== History ==
Riviera was built between 1962 and 1964 at 12 Waryńskiego Street in Warsaw, Poland. It was designed designed by Kazimierz Thor, Józef Bubicz, and Czesław Molenda, as a dormitory for students of the Warsaw University of Technology. The building consists of three connected parts, including the skyscraper and two smaller parts, which included sports halls, a canteen, and an auditorium. Its upper façade was covered in the clinker brick, and the front façade was covered in large windors. It was the first skyscraper in Poland to function as a dormitory. With the height from the base to the roof equal 67 m, and the total height of 80 m, it was the second tallest building in the city until 1974, when Novotel Warszawa Centrum was constructed. From 1972 to 1979, at the ground floor was located the Galeria Remont art gallery, and from 1983 to 1989, Galeria RR art gallery. Since 1973, in the building complex is located the Klub Riviera Remont night club. In the 1990s, in the building basement was later Złota Skała recording studio.

The building was modernized in 1999. It included the renovations of the rooms, and the façade was covered in light blue and navy blue tiles made from the reflective glass.

== Characteristics ==
Riviera is located at 12 Waryńskiego Street in Warsaw, Poland. The building complex consists of three parts, including the skyscraper in the middle, and two smaller portions on the sides. It has 21 floors. Its height from the base to the roof is equal around 67 m, and its total architectural height is equal 80 m. Its façade is covered in light blue and navy blue tiles made from the reflective glass. It is the tallest student dormotory building in Europe.

The building is a dormitory owned and operated by the Warsaw University of Technology, designated for its students. They central portion of the building contains residential area, with over 700 dormitory rooms.

In the side building of the complex, at 12A Waryńskiego Street, is located the Klub Riviera Remont student night club.

The rear wall facing ulica Polna bears a bas relief of the periodic table of elements.
