= Marshal Residential District =

Neighbourhood in Warsaw, Poland

Coordinates: 52°13′18″N 21°01′00″E

- Neighbourhood
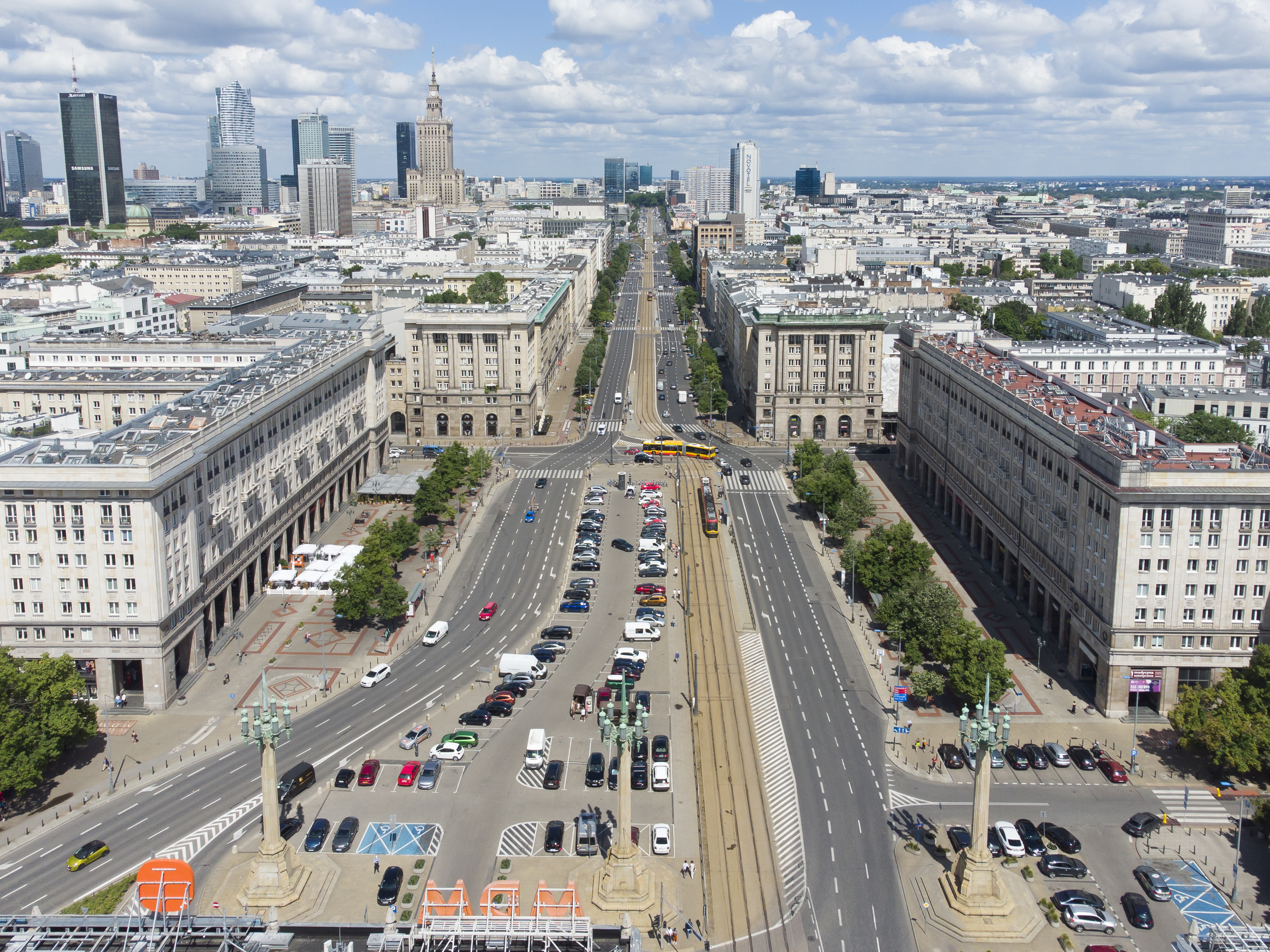
- The Constitution Square in the Marshal Residential District.
- Interactive map of Marshal Residential District
- Country: Poland
- Voivodeship: Masovian
- City and county: Warsaw
- District: Downtown
- City Information System area: South Dowontown
- Municipal neighbourhoods: Koszyki, Krucza
- Establishment: 22 July 1952
- Time zone: UTC+1 (CET)
  - Summer (DST): UTC+2 (CEST)
- Area code: +48 22

The Marshal Residential District (Polish: Marszałkowska Dzielnica Mieszkaniowa, MDM) is a mid-rise housing estate in Warsaw, Poland, located in the South Downtown neighbourhood. It is placed on the axis of Marshal Street, with the Constitution Square and Saviour Squares. The neighbourhood consists of large apartment buildings designed in neoclassical style, adhering to the principles of socialist realism. It was constructed between 1950 and 1952.

== Toponomy ==
The Marshal Residential District (Polish: Marszałkowska Dzielnica Mieszkaniowa, MDM) was named after its main road, Marshal Street (Polish: ulica Marszałkowska), which in turn was named after Franciszek Bieliński, who held the title of the Grand Marshal of the Crown from 1742 to 1766.

== History ==
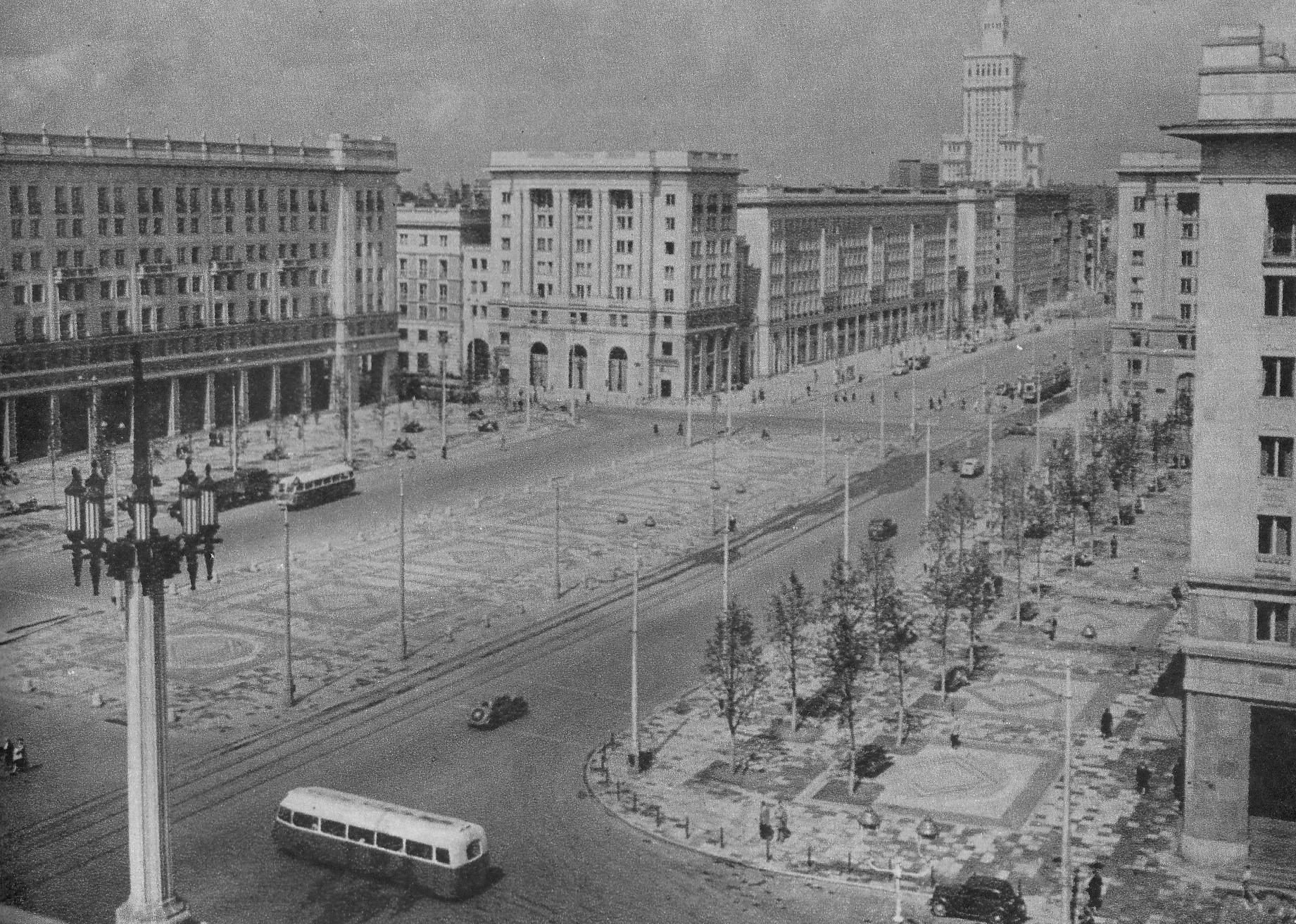
The Constitution Square in the 1950s

In 1949, following the opening of the East–West Route, the city management proposed to construct a large mid-rise housing estate, built in the social realism style, similar to Gorky Street in Moscow or Stalin Avenue in East Berlin, in place of an area mostly destroyed during the Second World War. It was designed by a team led by Stanisław Jankowski, Jan Knothe, Józef Sigalin, and Zygmunt Stępiński.

It was decided to widen the Marshal Street by deconstructing buildings on its west side, between Królewska and Koszykowa Streets. The further parts of the street were left unaltered, to keep the historical shape of the Saviour Square, as well as numerous preserved tenements in the area. This decision meant leaving the Church of the Holiest Saviour, which was placed to the right of the axis of Marshal Street, disturbing the urban layout. One of the architects, Jan Knothe, proposed to deconstruct church towers; however, the idea was not carried out. The buildings were constructed alongside Marshal Street. The social realism apartment buildings were also developed alongside Zoli Street, in between preserved tenements. Additionally, a new square, named the Constitution Square was planned in the central portion of the housing estate. It was constructed on the axis of Marszałkowska Street, in place of the compact street grid with tenements, most of which were destroyed during the Second World War. During the construction, all surviving buildings were demolished. The street layout was also significantly altered, including moving Koszykowa and Piękna Streets, and building the new Waryńskiego Street. It was envisioned to be the final destination of the annual International Workers' Day manifestation marches. Its centre was instead turned into a large car park. The neighbourhood was designed in the neoclassical style adhiring to the principles of the socialist realism, with large apartment buildings.

The construction of the estate began on 1 August 1950. The granite used on the façades of the buildings at Constitution Square came from the collection of Nazi Germany, which was confiscated by the authorities of Poland to be used for the reconstruction of destroyed Warsaw, instead of for the planned monuments to the German victory. The neighbourhood was ceremonially opened on 22 July 1952. The same day marked the ratification of the Constitution of the Polish People's Republic, which was commemorated with the naming of Constitution Square. However, the first residents moved to the building at 6B Constitution Square on 21 July 1951. The neighbourhood includes the MDM Hotel, which, being opened in 1952, became the first hotel to be opened in Warsaw after the end of the Second World War.

In 1952, the People's Army Avenue was built to the south of the Marshal Residential District. Later, it became part of the Baths Route, an expressway built between 1971 and 1974, which connects the city centre with the east side.

Between 1953 and 1955, the estate was further expanded with the construction of an extension, now forming the neighbourhood of Latawiec. It was placed between People's Army Avenue, Marshal Street, Mokotowska, and Koszykowa Street, with Emancipation Avenue as its main axis, and a pentagonal shape and an area of around 18 hectares. The neighbourhood featured apartment buildings designed in the Renaissance Revival style.

In the 1980s, it was planned to construct the Plac Konstytucji (Constitution Square) station of the M1 line of the Warsaw Metro underground rapid transit system. Its preliminary construction began in 1986, before being halted in 1989 due to budgetary restrictions. The city announced plans to resume the project in 2019, and presented its design in 2022. Currently, the preparatory work is in progress ahead of the construction.

In 1989, the coffeehouse Niespodzianka at 6 Constitution Square was used as the headquarters of the Solidarity Citizens' Committee of Warsaw, which took part in the 1989 Polish parliamentary election.

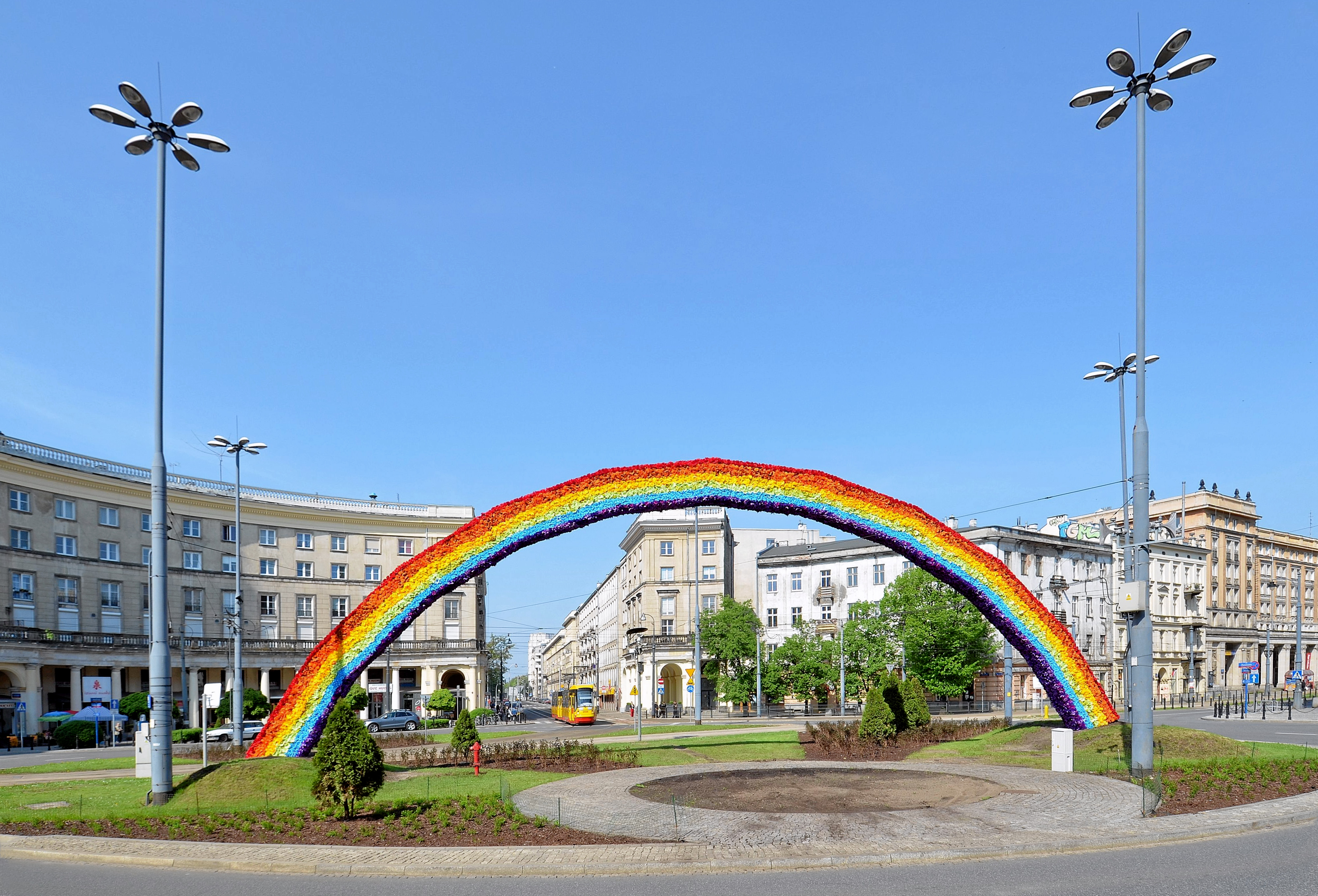
The Rainbow art installation, unveiled in 2012, and removed 2015

On 8 July 2012, the Rainbow art installation, made by Julita Wójcik, was unveiled at the Saviour Square. It consisted of a metal arch, covered in thousands of colourful plastic flowers. It became associated with the LGBT rights movement due to its resemblance to its symbol, the rainbow flag. The association, and its location near the Church of the Holiest Saviour, caused numerous controversies and protests by conservative groups, with many calls for its removal. The sculpture was set on fire during the night from 12 to 13 October 2012 by an arsonist. Between 2012 and 2014, the installation was set on fire by arsonists four more times, including by a large group of far-right rioters during the celebrations of the National Independence Day of Poland on 11 November 2013. It was rebuilt each time. It was eventually permanently removed by the city on 27 August 2015.

== Architecture and layout ==
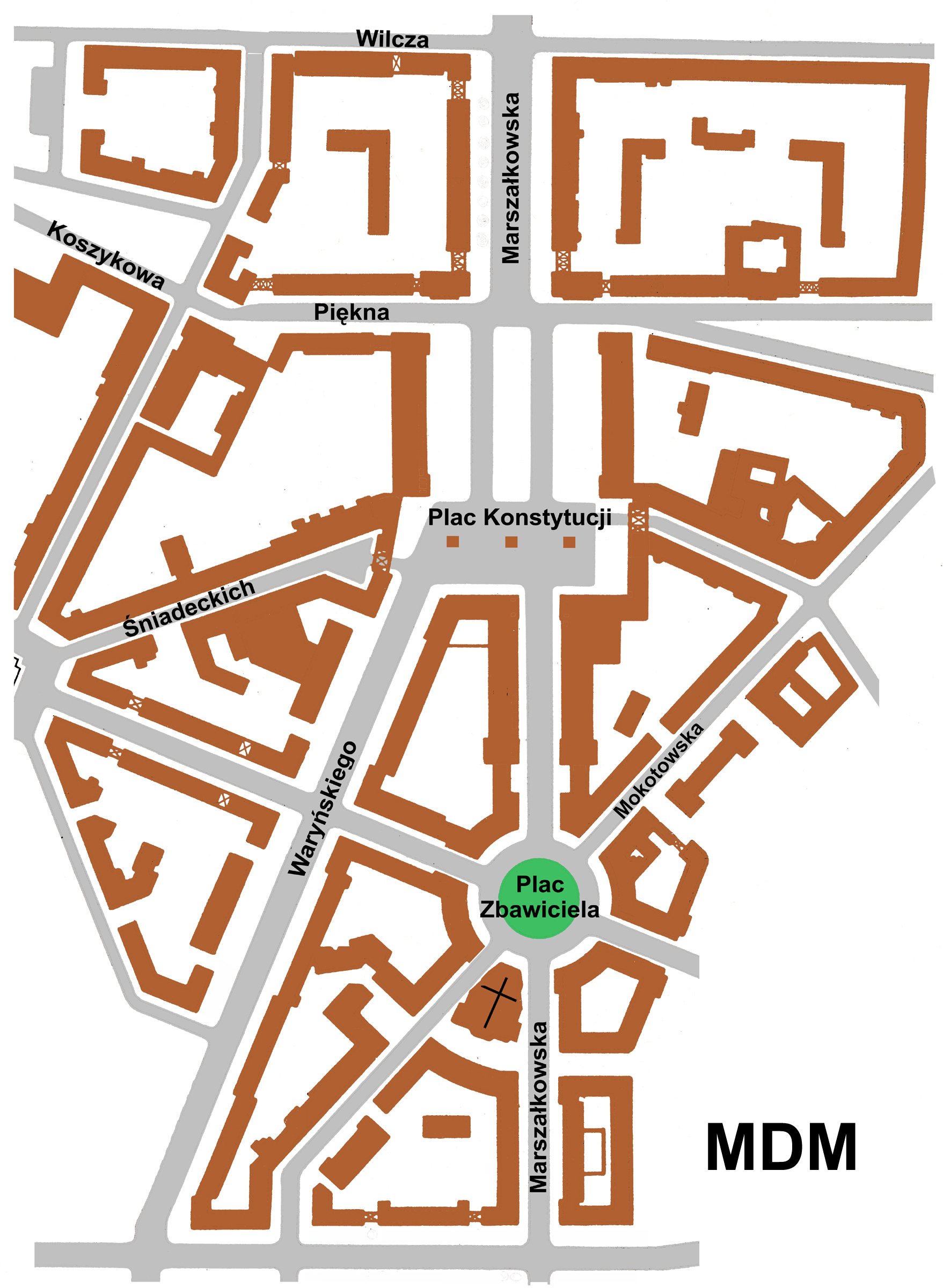
The layout of the Marshal Residential District

The Marshal Residential District is placed on the axis of Marshal Street, with the Constitution Square and Saviour Squares. It is also focused around the streets such as Koszykowa, Mokotowska, Piękna, Śniadeckich, Waryńskiego. To the north, it borders Wilcza Street, and to the south, People's Army Avenue.

It is a mixed-use development with monumental apartment buildings, with stores and restaurants on the ground levels, designed in neoclassical style, following the principles of socialist realism. Their façades are lined with sandstone and granite pannels, and with large arcades, cornices, and attics. Numerous buildings are also decorated with sculptures and reliefs, such as the one at 34 and 50 Koszykowa Street, with the sculptures of The Music, Fine Arts, and Theatre by Józef Gosławski. The neighbourhood also incluces the MDM Hotel at 1 Constitution Square.
