= MDM Hotel =

Hotel in Warsaw, Poland

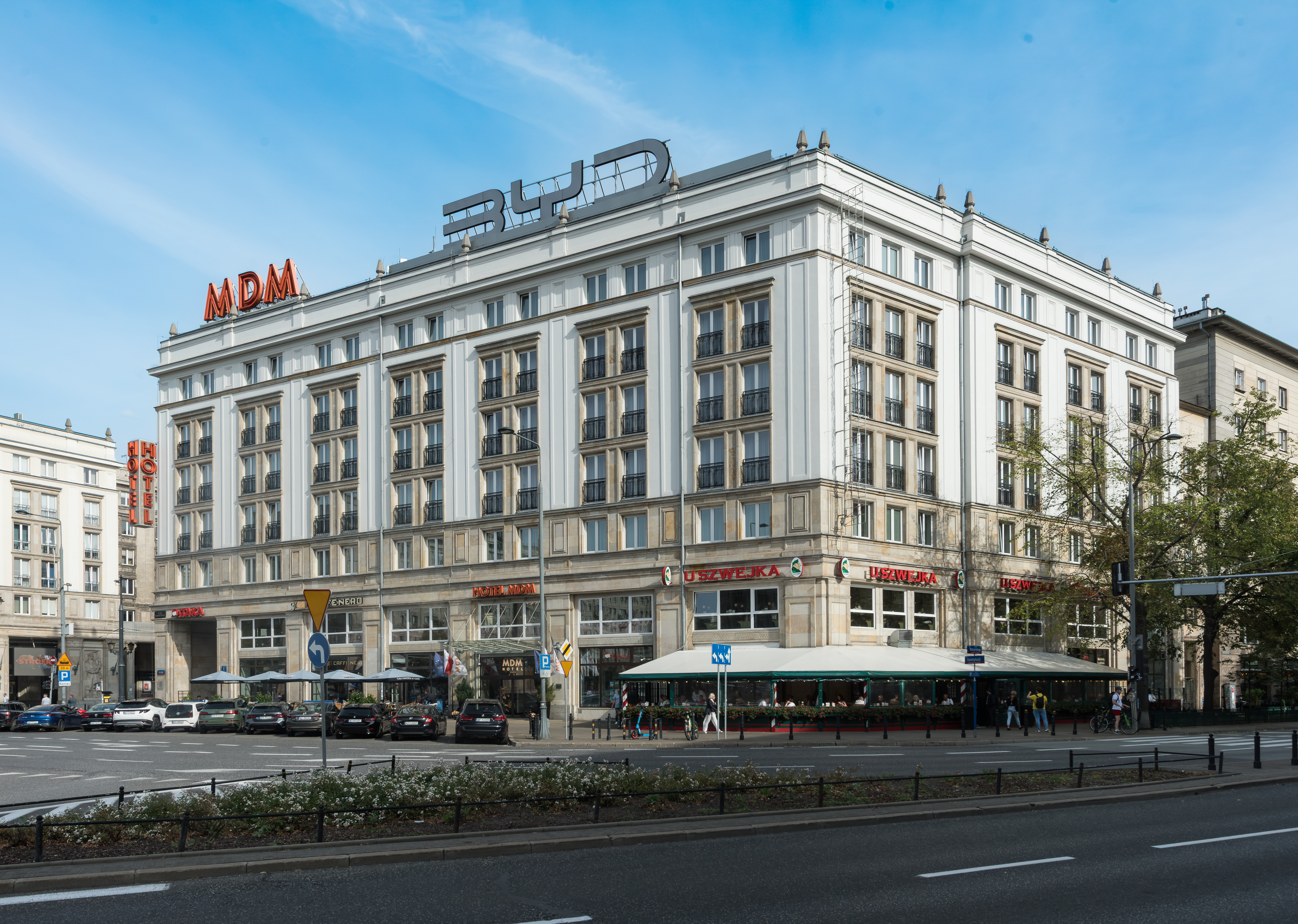
- The MDM Hotel in 2019.
- Interactive map of the MDM Hotel area

General information
- Type: Hotel building
- Architectural style: Socialist realism, neoclassical
- Location: Downtown, Warsaw, Poland, 1 Constitution Square
- Coordinates: 52°13′17.09″N 21°00′59.26″E
- Construction started: 1 August 1950
- Opening: 22 July 1952
- Owner: Strabag

Technical details
- Floor count: 7

Design and construction
- Architects: Stanisław Jankowski; Jan Knothe; Józef Sigalin; Zygmunt Stępiński

The MDM Hotel (Polish: Hotel MDM) is a three-star hotel in Warsaw, Poland, located at 1 Constitution Square, within the neighbourhood of South Downtown, at the intersection with Marszałkowska and Waryńskiego Streets. It is part of the architectural complex of the Marshal Residential District (Polish: Marszałkowska Dzielnica Mieszkaniowa, MDM). The seven-storey-tall building was designed in socialist realism style, with influences from the neoclassical architecture, and was opened on 22 July 1952.

== History ==
The MDM Hotel was designed as part of the complex of the Marshal Residential District, by team of architects led by Józef Sigalin, wirh other key members being Stanisław Jankowski, Jan Knothe and Zygmunt Stępiński. Its construction begun on 1 August 1950, and it was opened on 12 July 1952. It became the first hotel to be opened in Warsaw after the end of the Second World War.

Originally, it was envisioned to construct series of skyscrapers around the Constitution Square. Later it was also proposed to construct a single skyscraper at the Saviour Square. Neither of the ideas was ultimately realised. Instead, the seven-storey-tall hotel building was constructed at the southern portion of the Constitution Square.

For many years, its roof was decorated with a neon sign with text "Podróżuj z Lotem" (Travel with LOT), an advertisement of the LOT Polish Airlines, which became characteristic element of the building. The hotel also housed a popular dance club Pod Kandelabrami.

It was originally incorporated into the city-own hotel group Syrena, which was sold in 1997 to Wiener Bau Holding (currently Strabag) for 24 million US dollars, which plaged to in return invest 36 million euros back into the hotels. It failed to do so, and was later fined to pay 40 million złoties back to the city.

In 2017, the building received status of a protected cultural property. It was renovated between 2018 and 2019, with its façade being restored, and a new neon sign, with MDM logo, placed on its roof.

== Architecture ==
The hotel has seven storeys, similarly to all buildings around it, forming together the complex of the Marshal Residential District. Its façade was designed in socialist realism, with inspiration from neoclassical architecture, including its cornices. On its right side, it features a loggia with an arcade. The sides of the building are decorated with 4-metre-tall reliefs depicting workers. The hotel has a flat roof, decorated with cornice and arcade. It also features a large neon sign with MDM logo.

The building is located at the Constitution Square, with three candelabra pillars placed in front of it.

The three-star hotel has 142 rooms and one apartment suite.

== Gallery ==
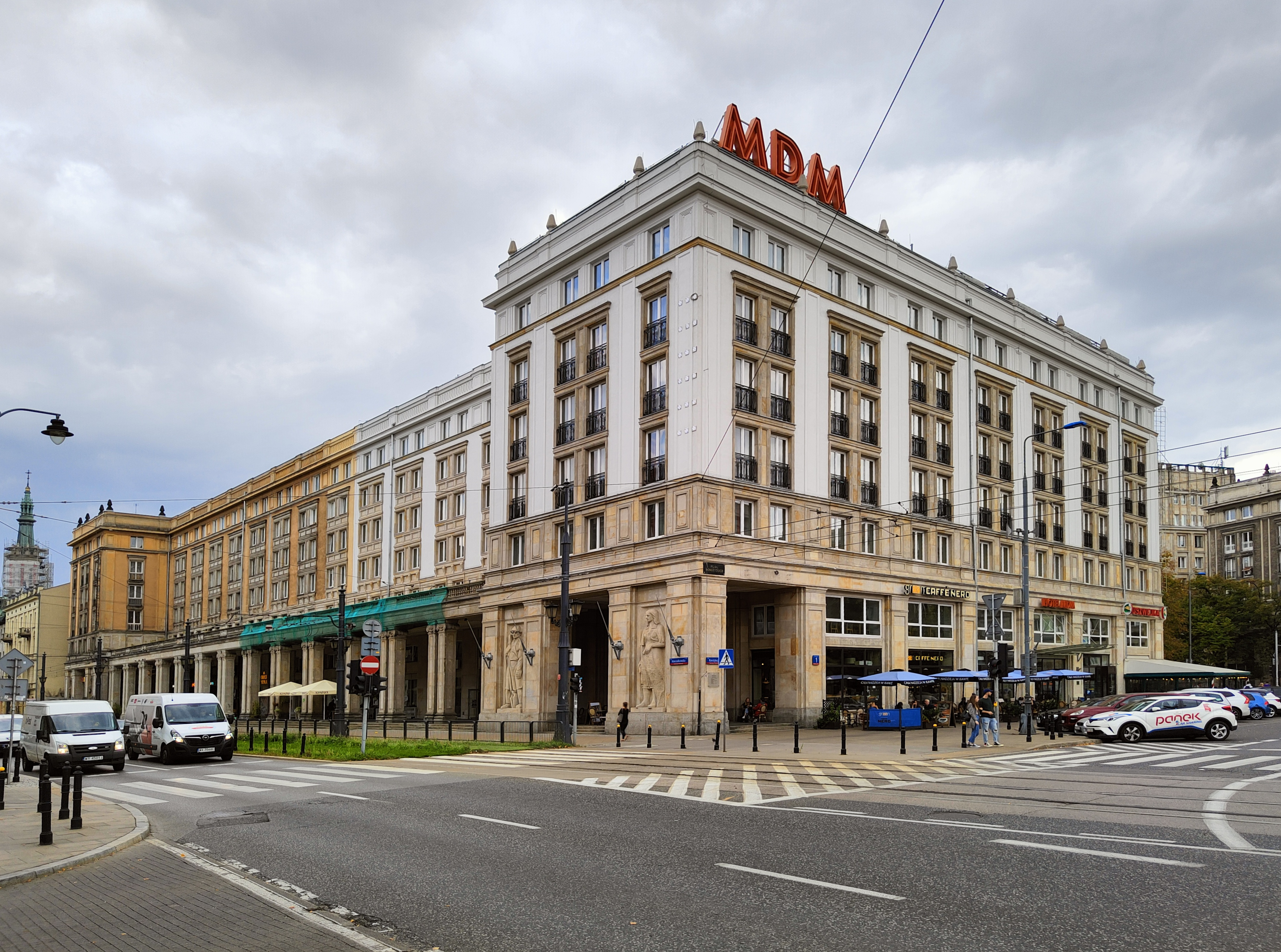
The MDM Hotel as seen from Marszałkowska Street.

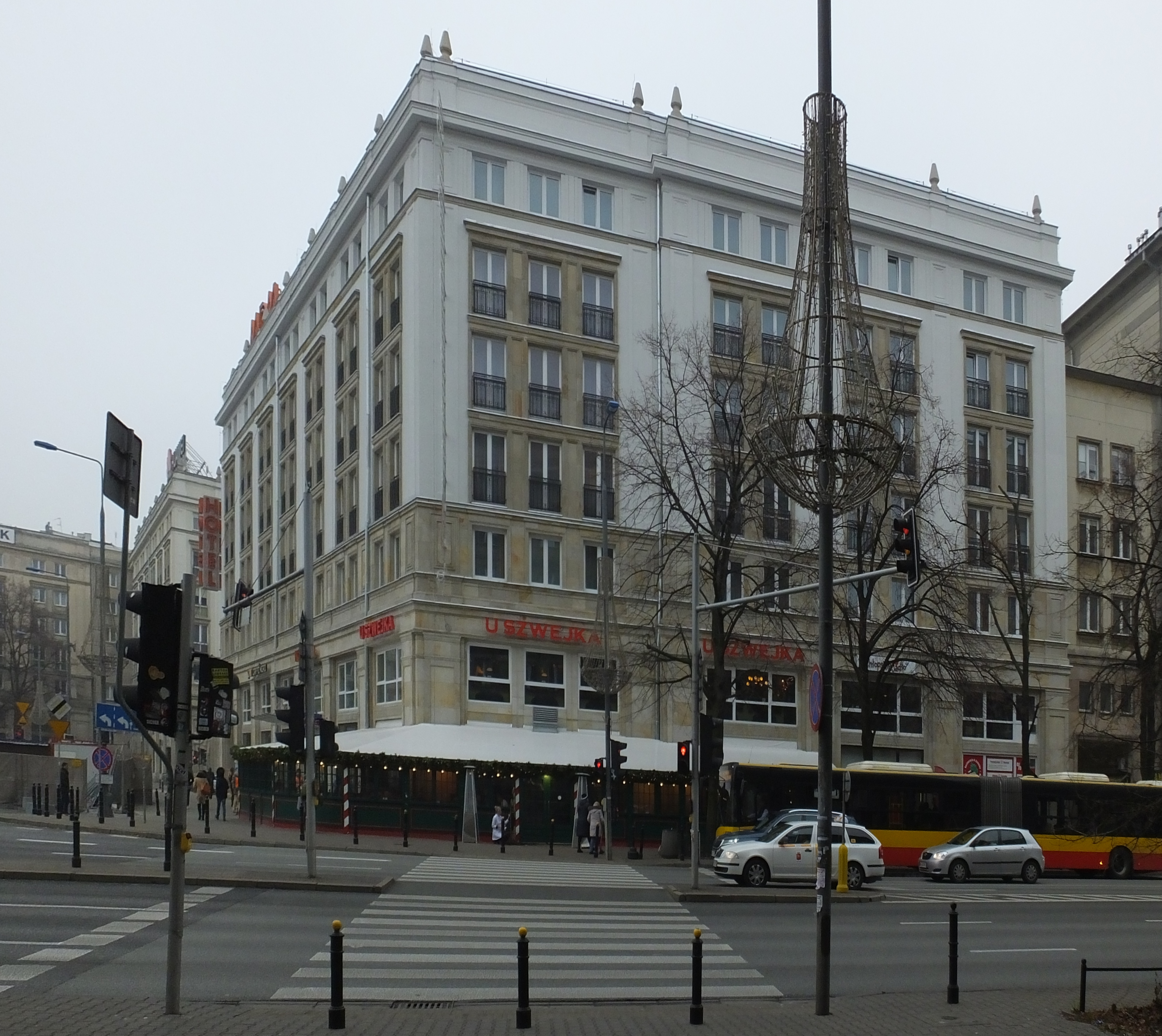
The MDM Hotel as seen from Waryńskiego Streets.

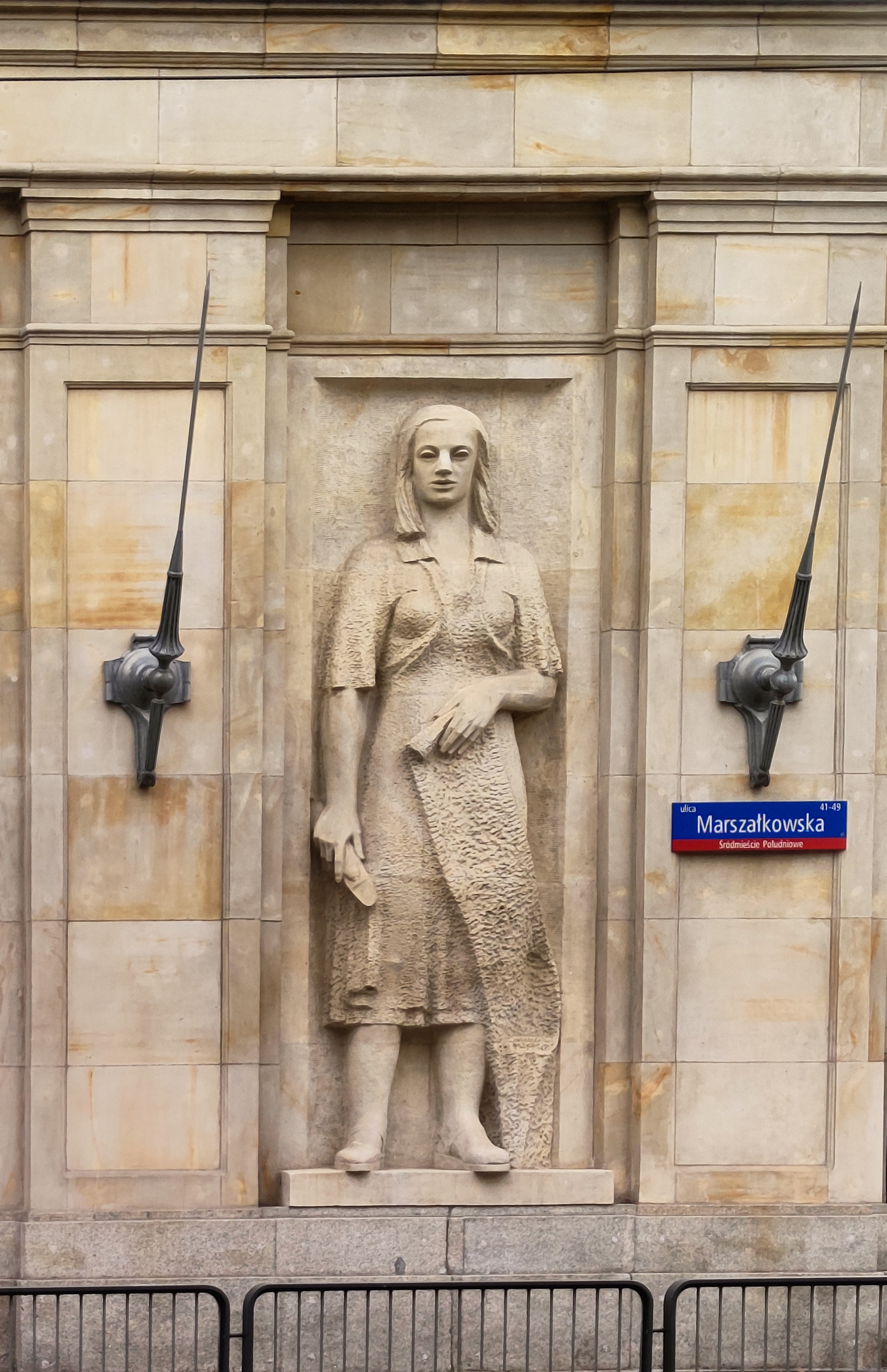
Relief of a female labourer.

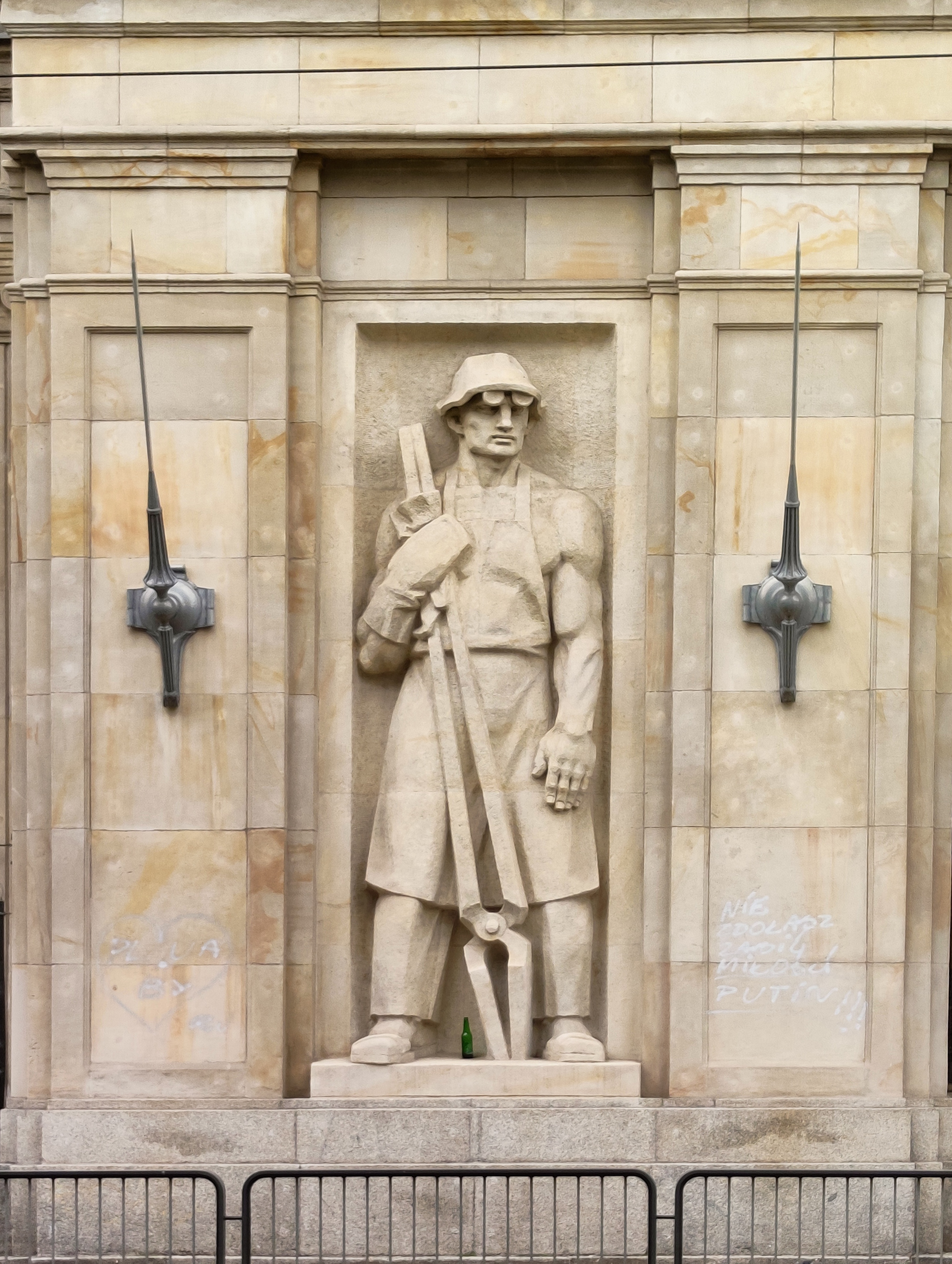
Relief of a male labourer.

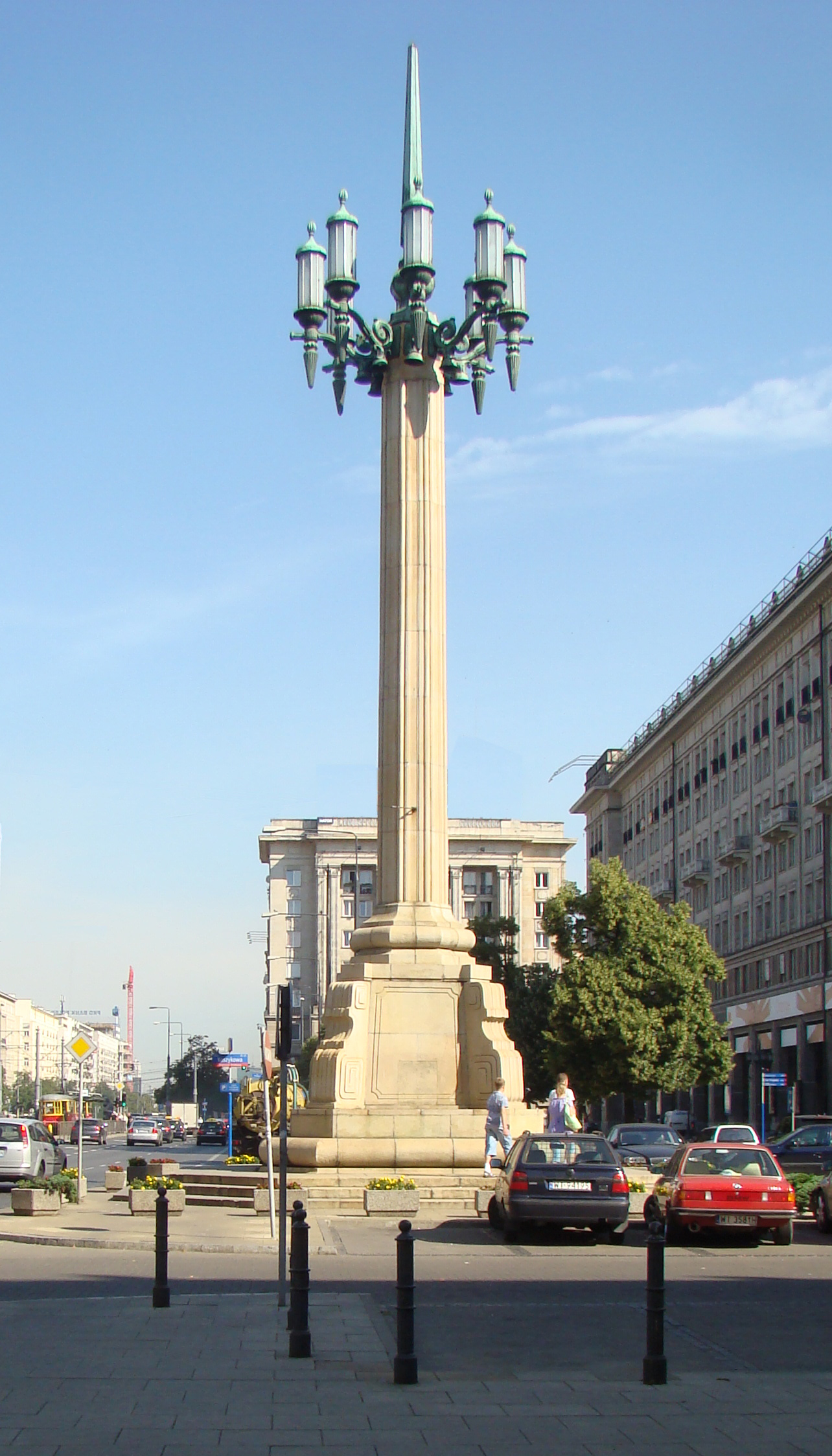
One of the three large candelabra pillars in front of the building.
