= Latawiec =

Neighbourhood in Warsaw

- Neighbourhood
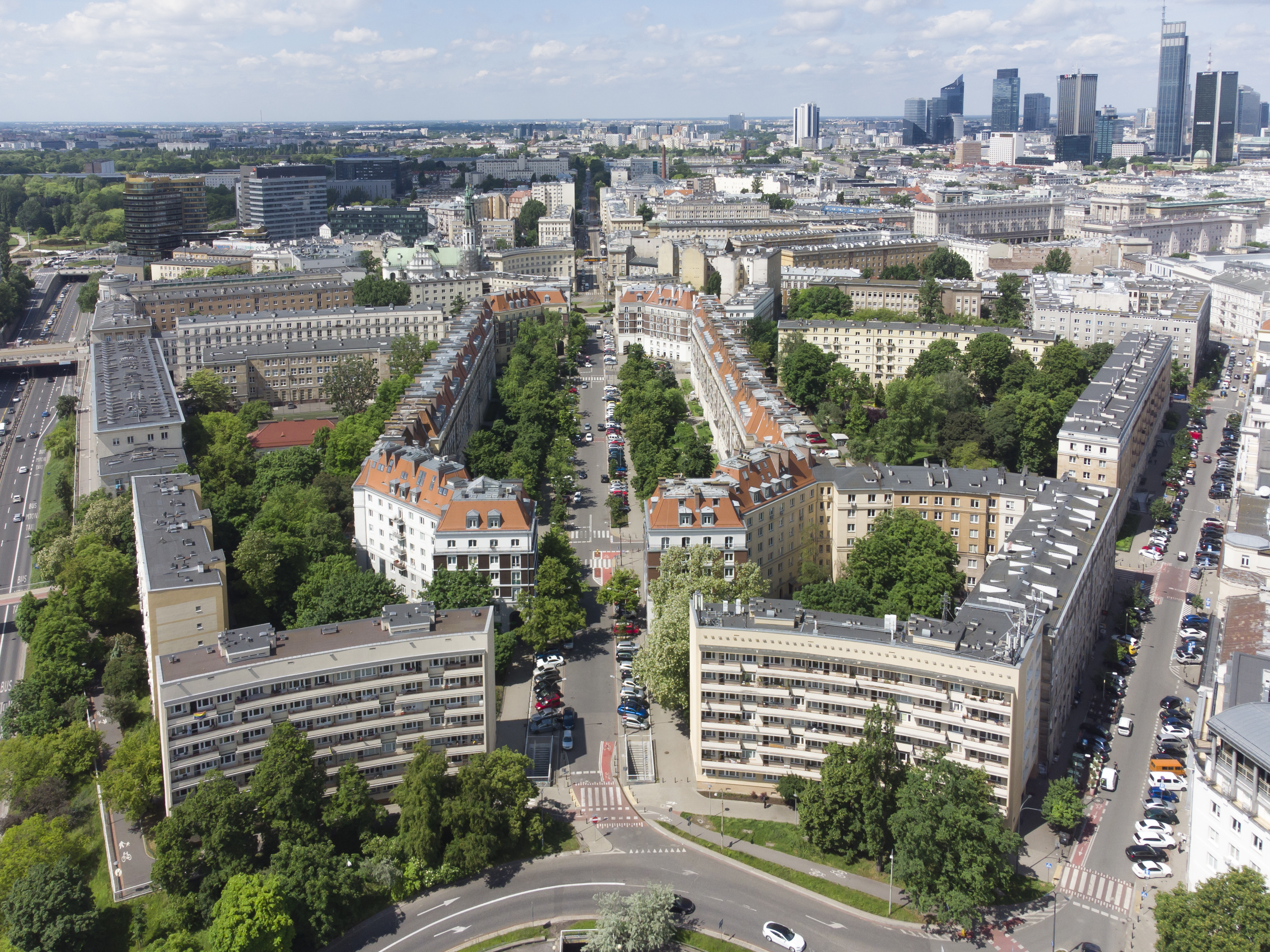
- Neighbourhood as seen from the Crossroads Square side
- Interactive map of Latawiec
- Country: Poland
- Voivodeship: Masovian
- City and county: Warsaw
- District: Downtown
- City Information System area: South Dowontown
- Administrative neighbourhood: Krucza
- Establishment: 1957

Area
  - Total: 0.18 km^{2} (0.069 sq mi)
- Time zone: UTC+1 (CET)
  - Summer (DST): UTC+2 (CEST)
- Area code: +48 22

Latawiec (Polish: [laˈta.vjɛt͡s], lit. 'Kite') is a residential neighbourhood in Warsaw, Poland, located in the neighbourhood of South Downtown, and built in the 1950s.

The main designer of the architectural layout, which covers an area of approximately 18 hectares, was Eleonora Sekrecka. The neighbourhood was a complement to the Marshal Residential District and is also referred to as MDM III. Some of its elements draw inspiration from the Renaissance style. The central street of the neighbourhood, featuring an octagonal square, is Wyzwolenia Avenue.

== History and characteristics ==
The neighbourhood of Latawiec was built between 1953 and 1957, with further additions in subsequent years. It was constructed on the site of buildings almost entirely destroyed during World War II, along the so-called Stanislavian Axis. It is recognized as part of the Marszałkowska Residential District and is referred to as MDM III. The neighbourhood is located between Crossroads Square, the Łazienki Route (Armii Ludowej Avenue), and the streets Marszałkowska, Mokotowska, and Koszykowa, within the South Downtown area defined by the Municipal Information System. The neighbourhood covers an area of approximately 18 hectares and is laid out in a pentagonal shape resembling a kite, which inspired its name (latawiec).

The project was designed by Eleonora Sekrecka, in collaboration with Stanisław Jankowski, Jan Knothe, and Zygmunt Stępiński from the Miastoprojekt Stolica design office. The team also included architects such as Burdyńska, Idzikowski, Jarczewski, Jezierski, Stanisławski, Szulecka, Teitelbaum, Thor, and Załęski. The design was inspired by French Renaissance architecture, particularly the Place des Vosges in Paris. The project aimed to reconstruct part of the Stanislavian Axis and integrate the neighbourhood with nearby green spaces, including the Ujazdów and Łazienki parks and the Botanical Garden.

The neighbourhood was constructed by the MDM Urban Construction Enterprise. The buildings are six to seven stories high. Compared to other housing developments of the time, the apartments were larger and taller, featuring built-in furniture and overhead cupboards. The floors were made of oak or beech wood. Although Latawiec was built by the Workers' Housing Association, it was primarily intended for prominent individuals such as managers, party-affiliated officials, and directors of state-owned enterprises. A total of 2,794 apartments were built. The neighbourhood was mostly ready for occupancy by 1955, but finishing works, such as plastering facades and laying sidewalks, continued until 1957. The last building designed by Sekrecka was completed in 1962. In 1960, two additional residential buildings were constructed near the Crossroads Square, designed by Zofia Fafius. These semi-circular buildings housed upscale apartments.

The neighbourhood includes a kindergarten and two schools. Ground floors of some buildings were designated for commercial and service premises, particularly along Marszałkowska Street. Near Saviour Square, the "Salus" canteen provided specialized dietary options, being the only facility of its kind in Warsaw at the time. The neighbourhood also featured the two-hall Luna Cinema and became home to the Guliwer Puppet Theater. However, plans for a second cinema, a Polish Army theater at the Crossroads Square, two additional kindergartens, three residential buildings, and a student dormitory were never realized. Sculptures intended to decorate the main square, designed at the Lwowska Street Art Studio, were also omitted. Until the late 1960s, the development was complemented by pre-war tenement houses.

== Architecture and its criticism ==
The architecture of the Latawiec neighbourhood differs somewhat from the rest of the Marszałkowska Residential District due to its more residential character. It lacks ornamental details, balusters, attics, and the use of decorative stone. The design of the buildings along Marszałkowska Street is the most similar to the other parts of the Marszałkowska Residential District, particularly with the decorative turret on the building at the intersection with Armii Ludowej Avenue. The buildings are arranged in bands along the streets but are set back from them. The balconies feature grilles. A clear tripartite division of volumes is evident, with two-story socles and a compact development. The buildings along Koszykowa, Natolińska, and Służewska streets are the most modestly finished.

In the central part of the neighbourhood, there is a green square with an eight-sided arcade, created by setting the buildings back from Wyzwolenia Avenue. It is 70 meters wide and 215 meters long. In the 1950 urban planning concept, which aimed to restore the Stanisławów Axis, this space was tentatively called the New Square. The buildings surrounding it feature red gambrels, tall chimneys, dormers, and facades made of brown bricks and light plaster. The square references French Renaissance architecture. The Italian variant of this influence can be seen in the buildings at the corner of Wyzwolenia Avenue and Marszałkowska Street.

The Renaissance-inspired style was in conflict with socialist realism, which led to the main architect of the neighbourhood, Eleonora Sekrecka, losing her positions in the architectural community and party roles, and she was no longer assigned further commissions. The neighbourhood was criticized by Edmund Goldzamt, one of the main ideologists of socialist realism, in 1955 in the weekly Stolica. He pointed out issues such as the "inexplicable reference to French influences", "unpleasant narrowing", connections to solutions from the turn of the 19th and 20th centuries, the corridor layout of the buildings, the "lack of a new socialist city quality" in the design, and the "garishness of the architecture". He also emphasized that the neighbourhood had been criticized even during its planning phase by other members of the Association of Polish Architects.

However, Jarosław Zieliński presented a different opinion in his 2009 book. He praised the grand scale, interesting, and varied architecture of the neighbourhood. He mentioned as flaws the overly abundant greenery and the "box-like blocks" obscuring the neighbourhood from the east. The architectural style of the buildings on the side of the Crossroads Square, designed by Zofia Fafius, differs from the style of the rest of the urban layout.

== Streets ==
The central street and main axis of the neighbourhood is Wyzwolenia Avenue, which was known as 6 Sierpnia Street until 1946. The neighbourhood is also crossed by the streets: Natolińska, Służewska, Stefania Sempołowska, and Faustyn Czerwijowski. The names of the latter three streets were officially given by a resolution of the Presidium of the National Council in Warsaw on 18 May 1957. The justification for naming Służewska Street was that it runs along the site of the former street of the same name. Faustyn Czerwijowski was the first director of the Warsaw Public Library, which is located on Koszykowa Street. As for Sempołowska Street, it was named in connection with the nearby schools: two primary schools of the Association of Children – number 30 (newly established) and number 22 (relocated from Mokotowska Street), located at number 4. Before the name change, the building at this address had the working name of Nowonatolińska Street 2. The streets Natolińska and Służewska existed before, but their layout was adjusted.

== Monument ==
The neighbourhood was included on the list of cultural heritage sites of modern Warsaw (1945–1989), compiled by the Association of Polish Architects in 2003, based on all the criteria analyzed at the time.

In 2014, a draft local zoning plan for the Jazdów–Western part area was prepared, which also covered the Latawiec neighbourhood. This plan allowed for the addition of a new building on the square between Służewska, Natolińska, and Koszykowa streets. However, following the initiation of the procedure for listing the Marszałkowska Residential District as a historical monument, the project had to be revised. The zoning plan adopted in 2014 prevents further development of the neighbourhood by designating green areas on the disputed site.

In 2015, the urban layout, along with the rest of the Marszałkowska Residential District, was entered into the register of historical monuments of the Masovian Voivodeship (decision no. 340/2015 from 27 April 2015). The registration became final two years later, and the register number is A−1377 from 13 March 2017. The urban layout of Latawiec and individual buildings of the neighbourhood have been listed in the municipal register of historical monuments of the city of Warsaw since 2012 and 2014 (registration number SRO10916). Earlier, the layout of Latawiec had been listed as a monument as part of the Stanisławów Axis (register no. 543 from 1 July 1965, in the municipal register no. SRO34205).

== Commemorations ==
- On the square at 5 Służewska Street, where the pre-war five-story building designed by Feliks Michalski once stood, there is a stone commemorating Józef Piłsudski, who lived there in 1917.
- A plaque commemorates Stanisław Skalski, a military aviation pilot, who lived in the building at 10 Wyzwolenia Avenue.

== Gallery ==
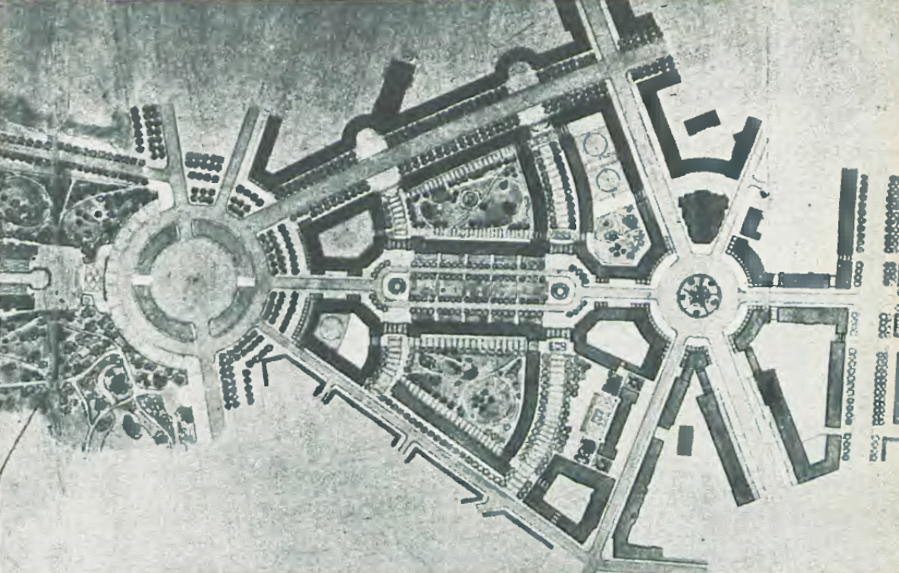
Original plan of the estate, published in 1953 in Stolica magazine, showing its kite-like shape

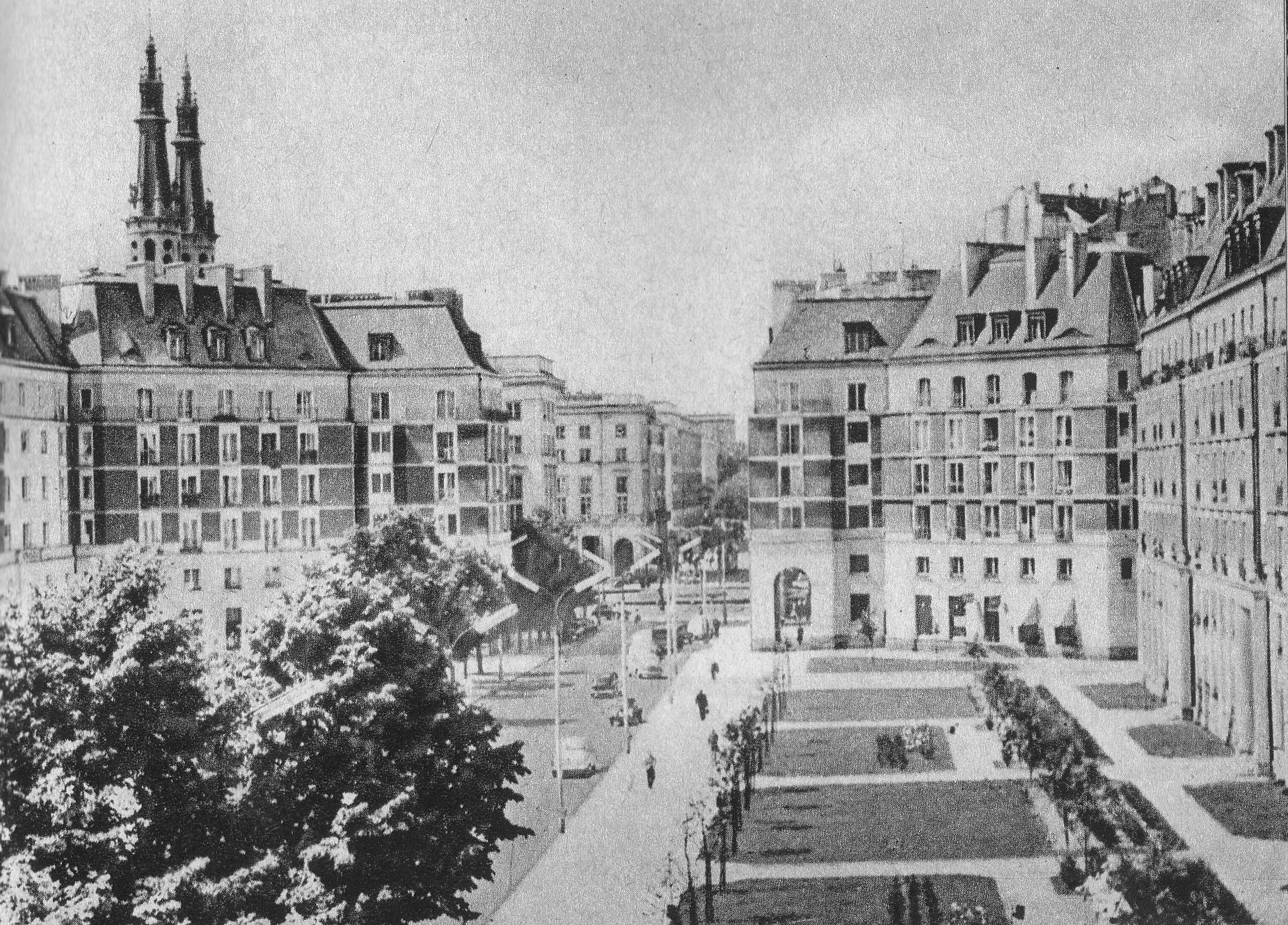
Fragment of the estate in 1962

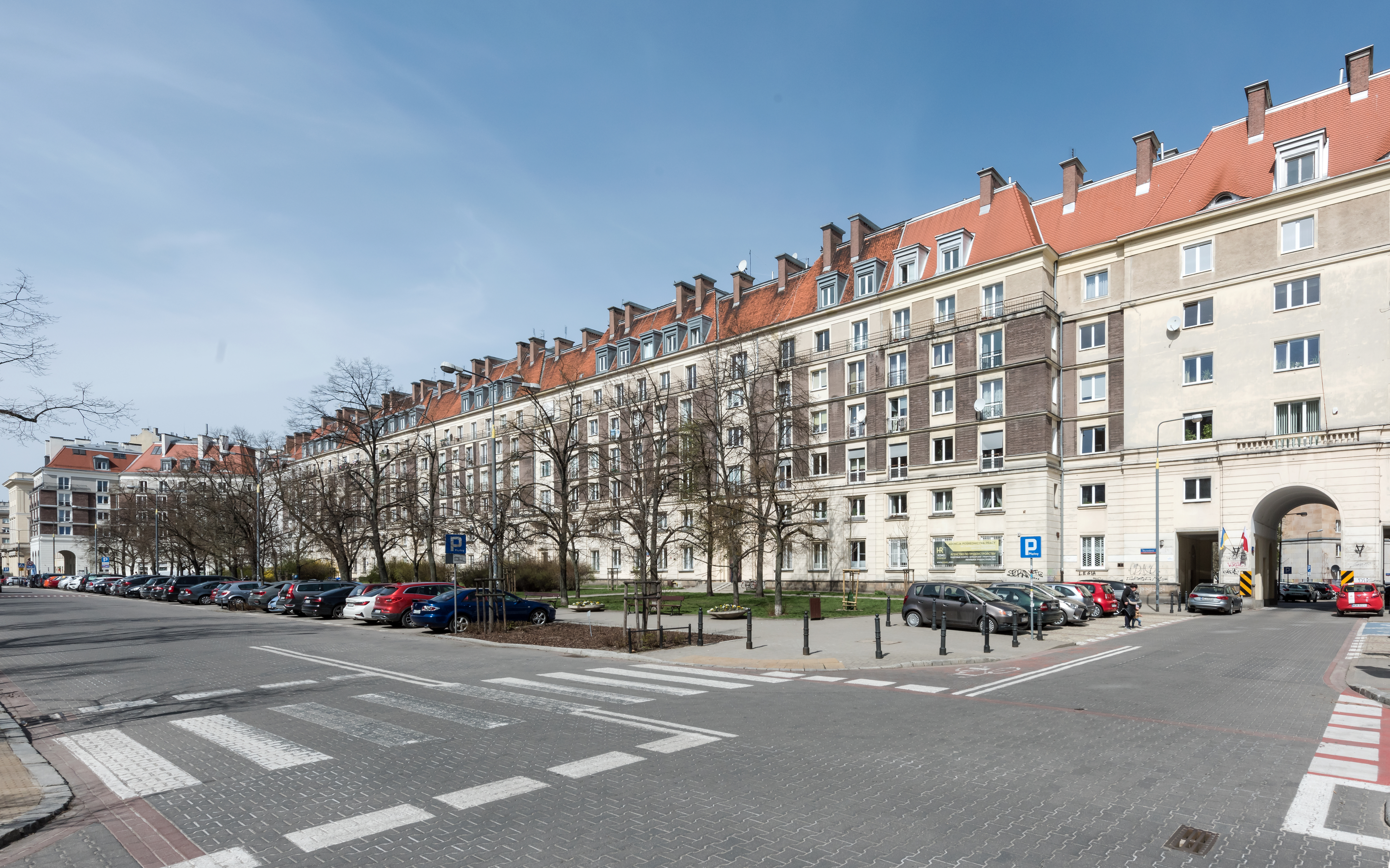
Buildings on Wyzwolenia Avenue, with Renaissance-inspired aesthetics. To the right, Służewska Street runs through the building at 6 Wyzwolenia Avenue

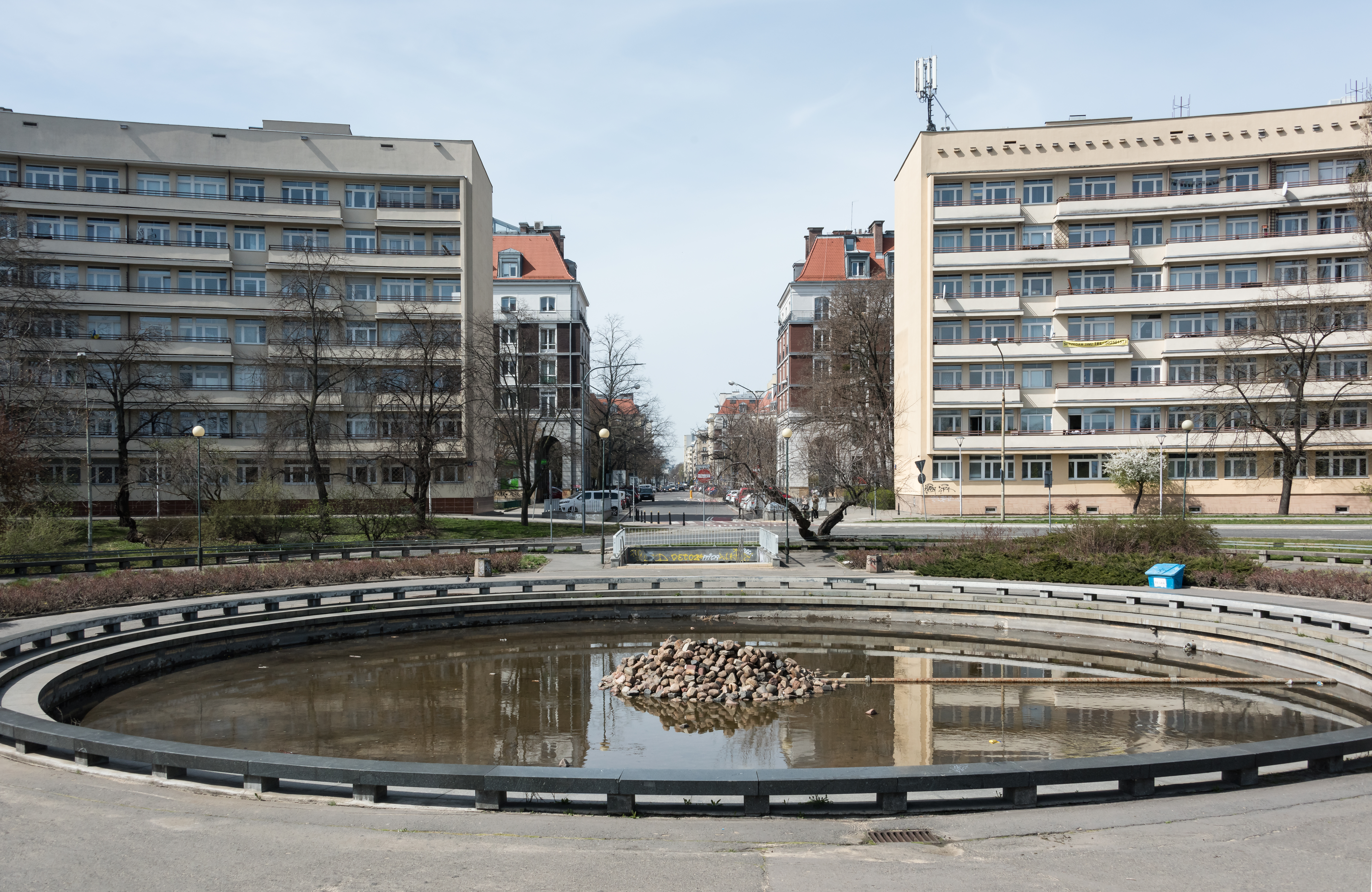
Two buildings added in 1960 by Zofia Fafius, with architecture differing from the rest of the estate, seen from the fountain side on the Crossroads Square

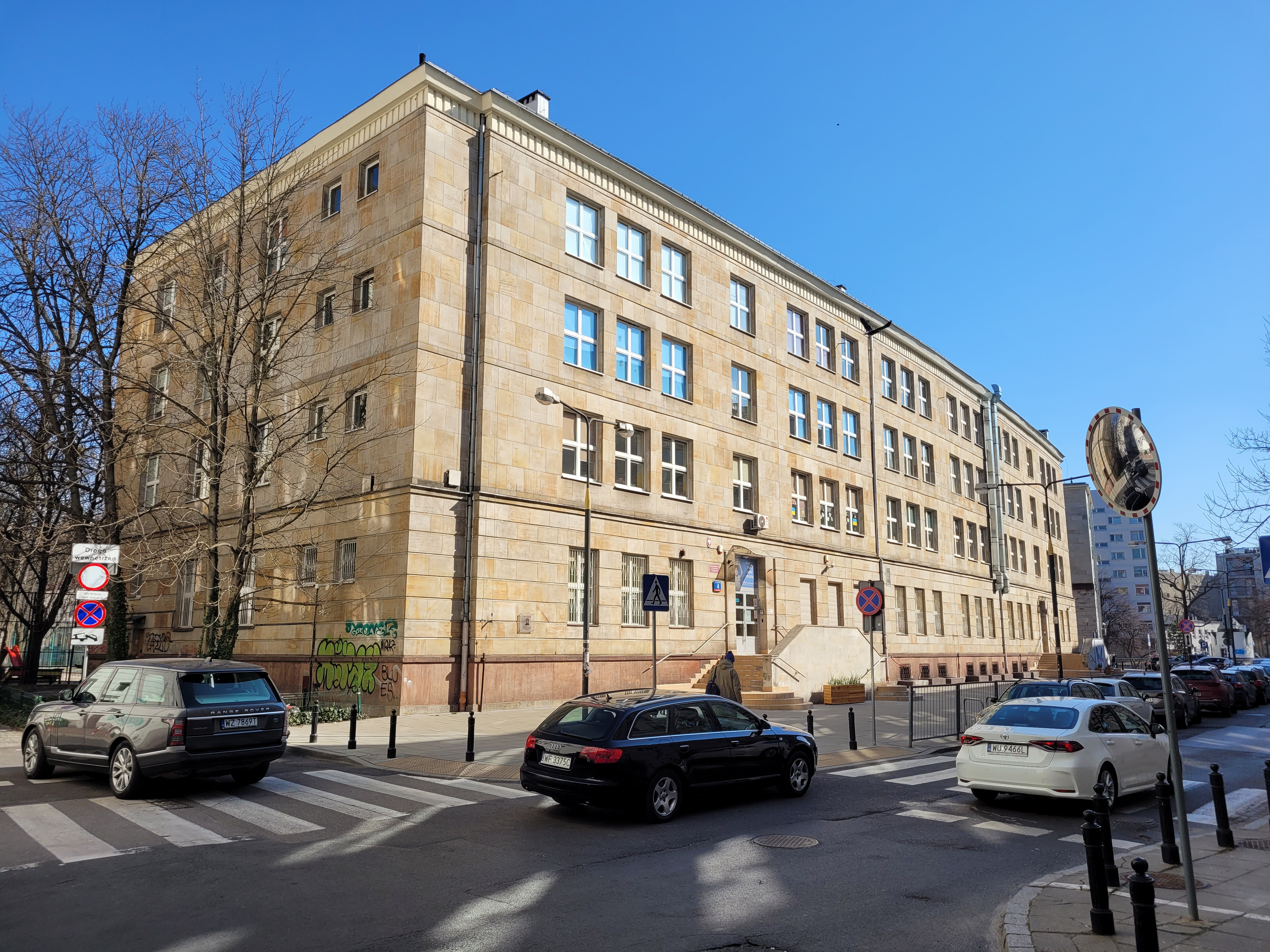
Primary School No. 48 named after Adam Próchnik at 4 Sempołowska Street

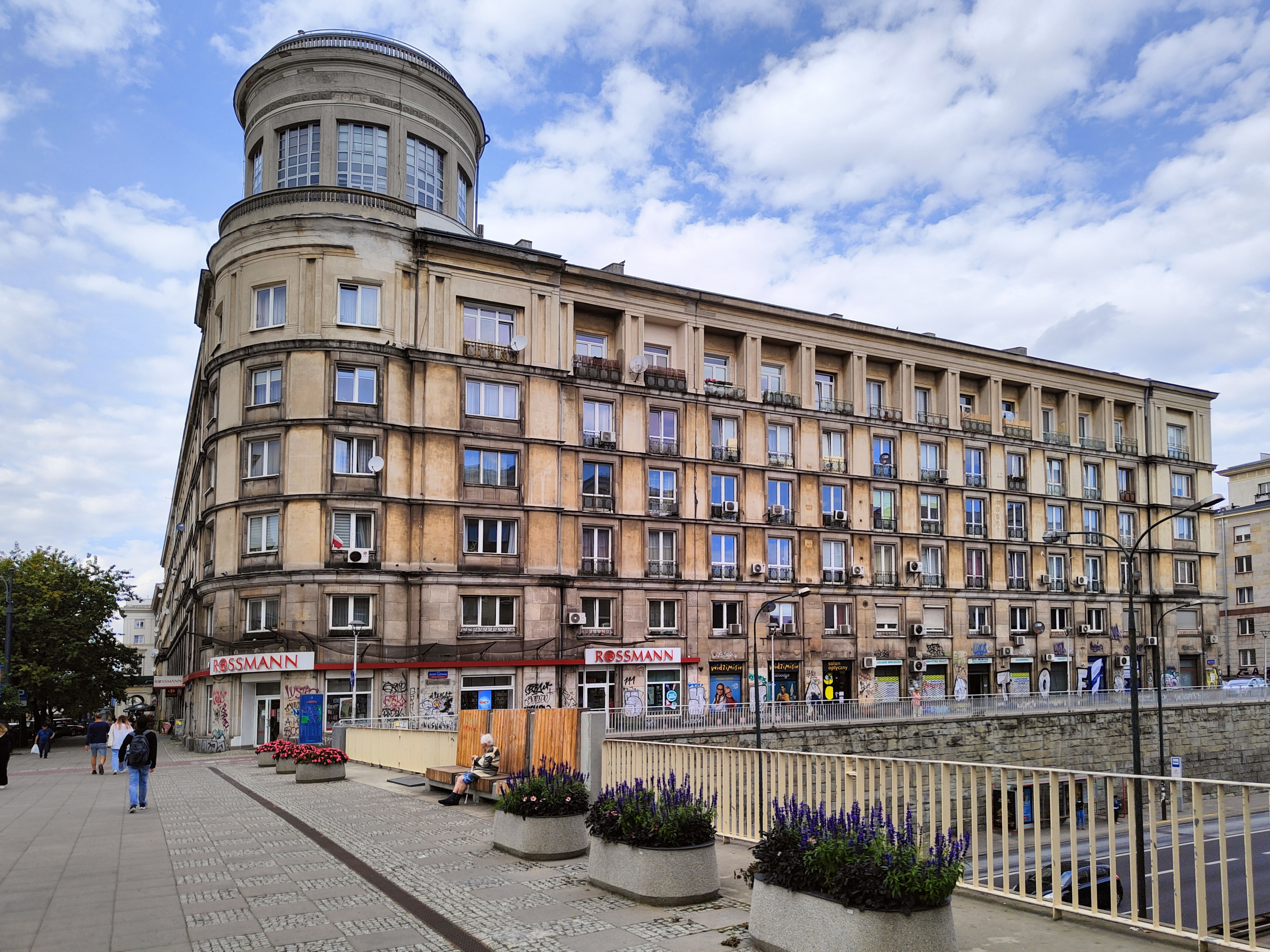
Building at 28 Marszałkowska Street with a turret, matching the aesthetic of other parts of the Marszałkowska Residential District
