= Constitution Square, Warsaw =

Urban square in Warsaw, Poland

Constitution Square
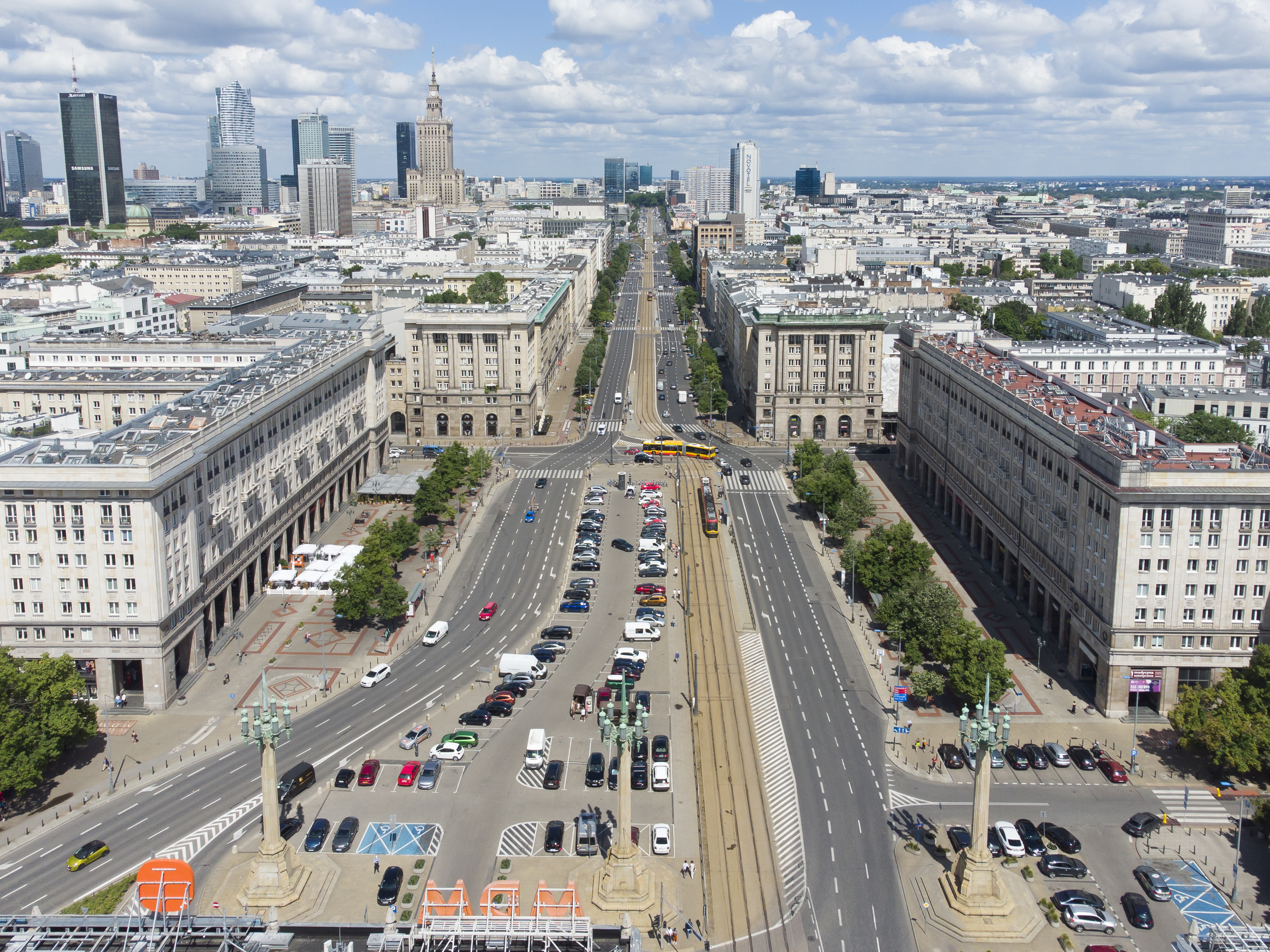
- Constitution Square in 2022, as seen from the south

- Location within Warsaw
- Location: Downtown, Warsaw, Poland
- Coordinates: 52°13′21″N 21°00′58″E
- North: Marszałkowska Street
- East: Koszykowa Street; Piękna Street
- South: Marszałkowska Street; Waryńskiego Street
- West: Koszykowa Street; Śniadeckich Street

Construction
- Completion: 22 July 1952

Constitution Square (Polish: Plac Konstytucji [ˈplat͡s kɔnstɨˈtut͡sji]) is an urban square, and a road intersection, in Warsaw, Poland, within the Downtown district. It is situated at the intersection of Koszykowa, Marszałkowska, Piękna, Śniadeckich, and Waryńskiego Streets.

Opened in 1952, Constitution Square is surrounded by the socialist-realist multifamily residential buildings of the Marshal Residential District.

== Name ==
Constitution Square was named on 19 July 1952 after the Constitution of the Polish People's Republic, which was ratified a few days later on 22 July, on the same day that the square was opened.

In 1999, a group headed by Radosław Sikorski, Deputy Minister of Foreign Affairs, launched a campaign to rename the square after Ronald Reagan, President of the United States from 1981 to 1989, as part of the decommunization efforts. It was unsuccessful, and the square remains one of the last places in the city with a name linked to the communist period.

In 2004, a small southwestern section of the square, at the intersection with Waryńskiego Street, was named Pakulski Brothers Alley (Polish: Zaułek Braci Pakulskich). The name comes from three brothers, Adam, Jan, and Wacław Pakulski, who owned chain of grocery stores Pakulski Brothers, with one of them formerly placed in a tenement at 57 Marszałkowska Street, in what is now the centre of the square.

== History ==
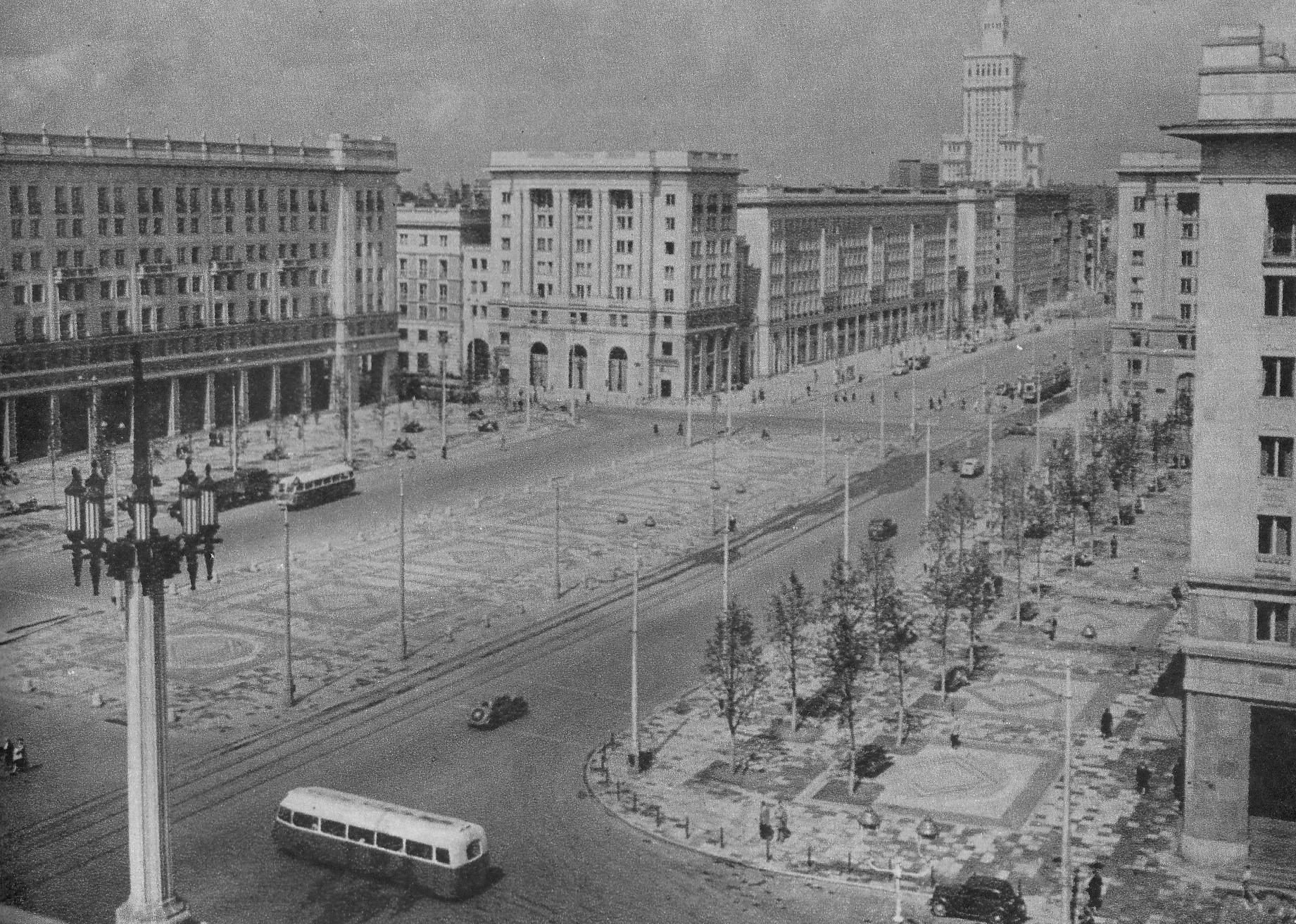
Constitution Square in the 1950s

Constitution Square was laid out in 1952 as the central part of a then-constructed housing estate of the Marshal Residential District. It was constructed on the axis of Marszałkowska Street, in place of the compact street grid with tenements, most of which were destroyed during the Second World War. During the construction, all surviving buildings were demolished. The street layout was also significantly altered, including moving Koszykowa and Piękna Streets, and building the new Waryńskiego Street.

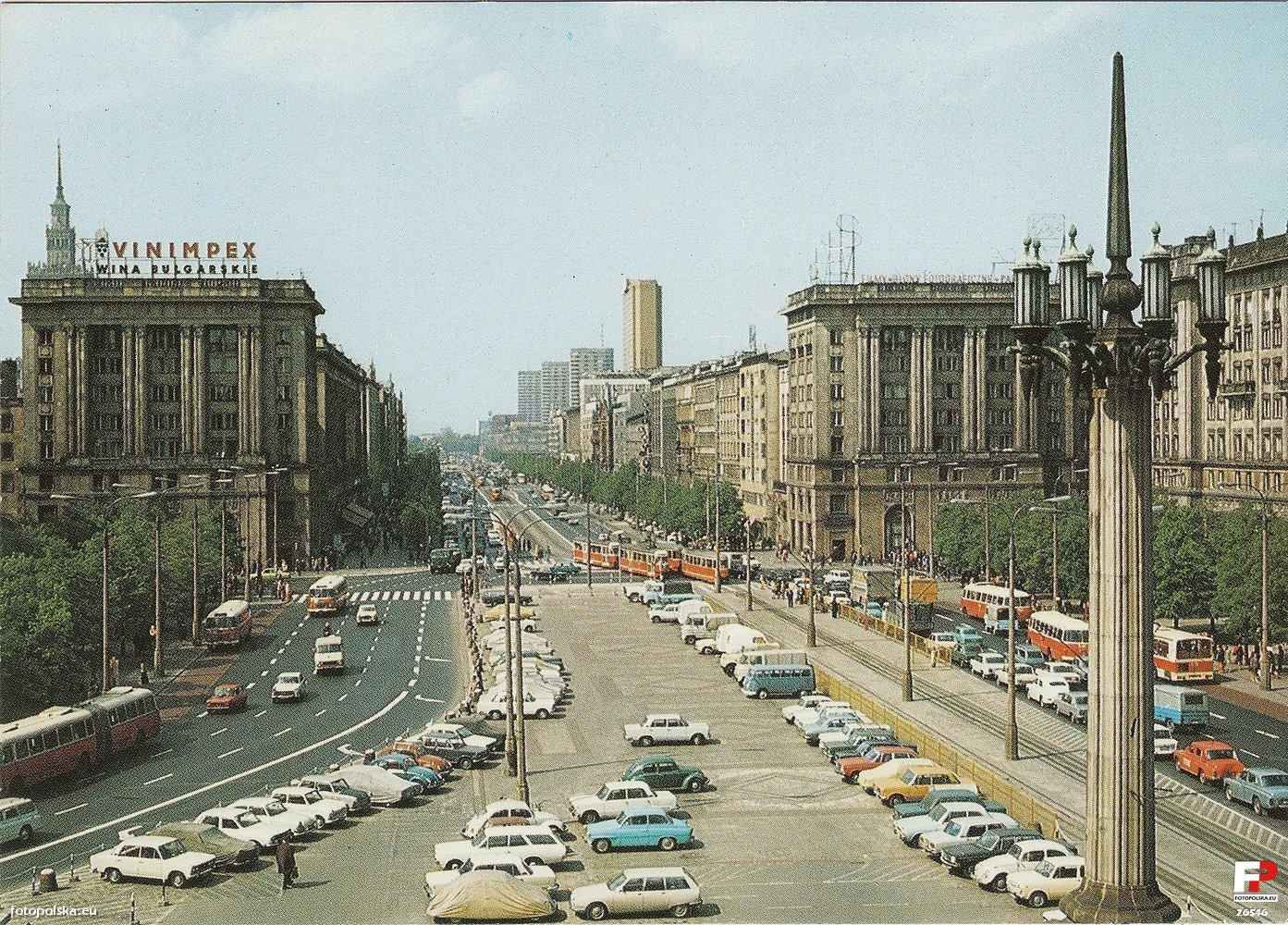
Constitution Square in the 1970s

Originally, the square was envisioned to feature a large fountain at its centre, and to be a final destination of the annual International Workers' Day manifestation marches. Its centre was instead turned into a large car park.

Constitution Square was ceremonially opened, together with the entire Marshal Residential District, on 22 July 1952. The same day marked the ratification of the Constitution of the Polish People's Republic, that is the square's namesake.

In 1989, the coffeehouse Niespodzianka at 6 Constitution Square was used as the headquarters of the Solidarity Citizens' Committee of Warsaw, which took part in the 1989 Polish parliamentary election. In 2019, a plaque commemorating this event was unveiled.

In the 1980s, it was planned to construct the Plac Konstytucji (Constitution Square) station of the M1 line of the Warsaw Metro underground rapid transit system. Its preliminary construction began in 1986, before being halted in 1989 due to budgetary restrictions. The city announced plans to resume the project in 2019, and in 2022 was presented its design. Currently, the preparatory work is in progress ahead of the construction.

== Characteristics ==
Constitution Square is on the axis of Marszałkowska Street, and forms an intersection of Koszykowa, Marszałkowska, Piękna, Śniadeckich, and Waryńskiego Streets. Tram tracks also run along the square. Its central section forms a car park, surrounded by the road intersection, while the outlying sections form a pedestrian area. The southwestern part, next to the intersection with Waryńskiego Street, is known as Pakulski Brothers Alley (Polish: Zaułek Braci Pakulskich).

The square is surrounded by six- and seven-storey multifamily residential buildings of the Marshal Residential District, designed in socialist realist style. This includes the MDM Hotel at the intersection of Marszałkowska and Waryńskiego Streets, the first hotel to be opened in Warsaw after the Second World War. Parallel to it, three large candelabra pillars are placed on the square. At the ground floors of the buildings around the square stores and services were opened.

Currently, the Plac Konstytucji station of the M1 line of the Warsaw Metro underground rapid transit system is planned there.

== Gallery ==
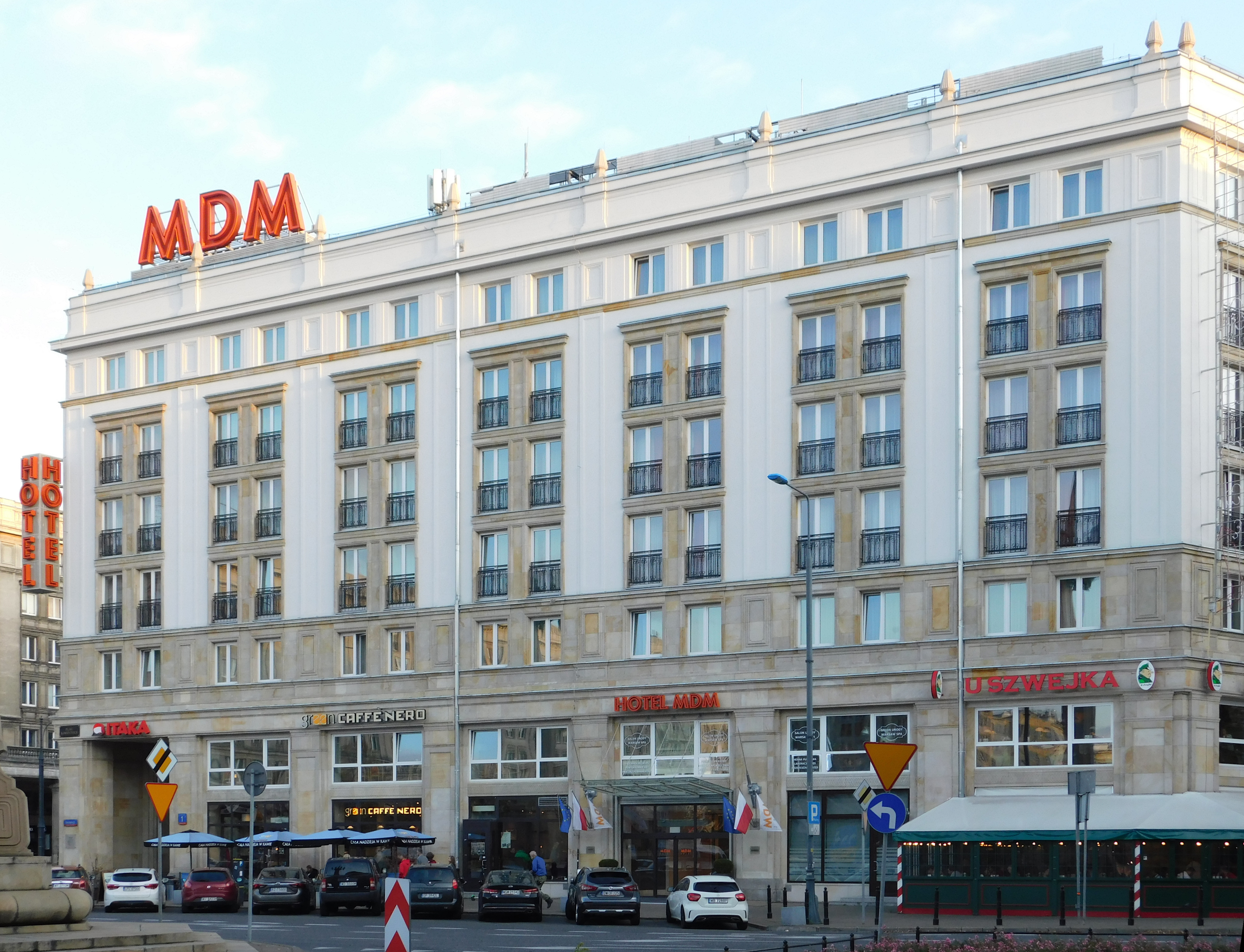
The MDM Hotel at 1 Constitution Square

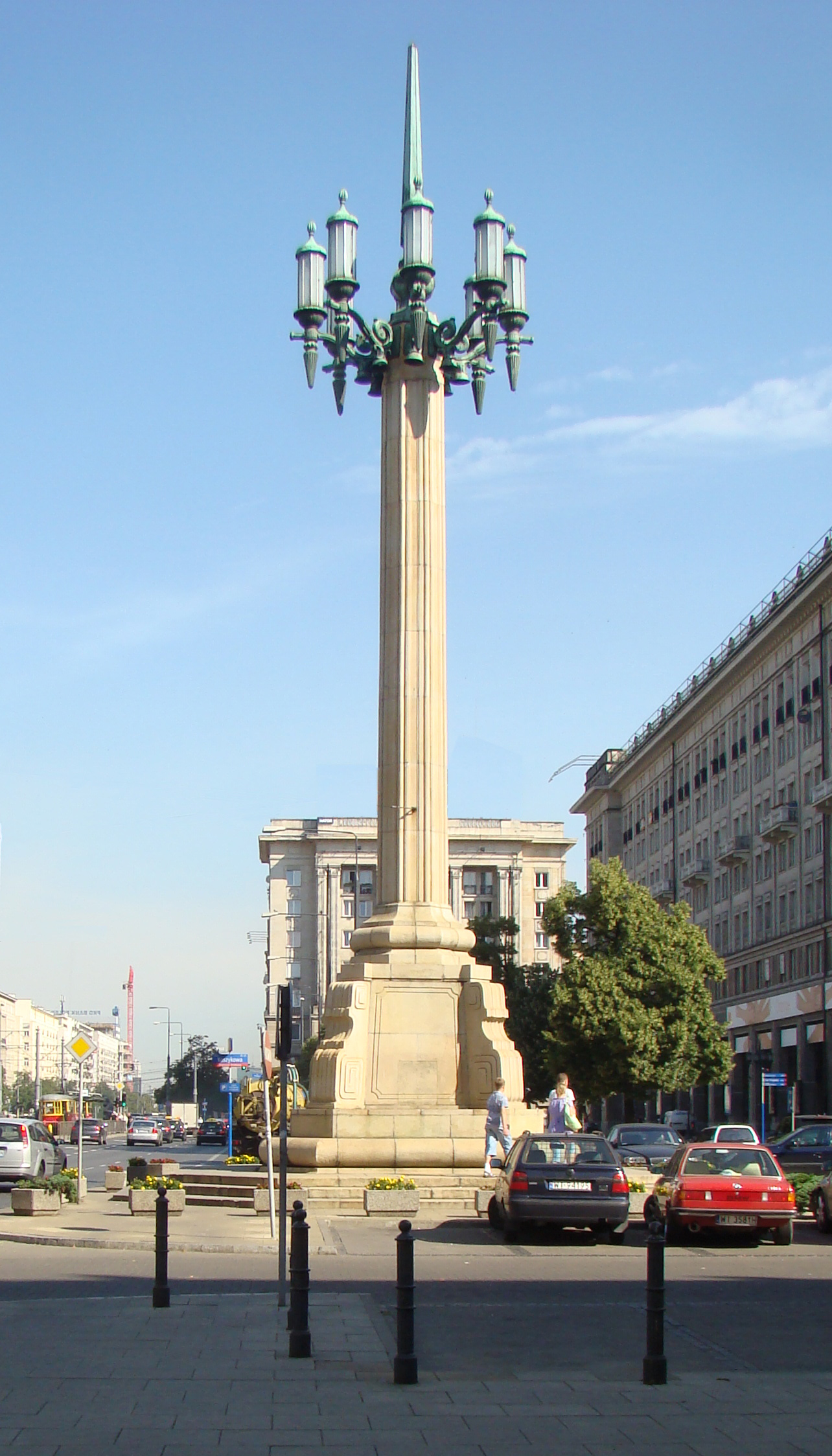
One of the three large candelabra pillars

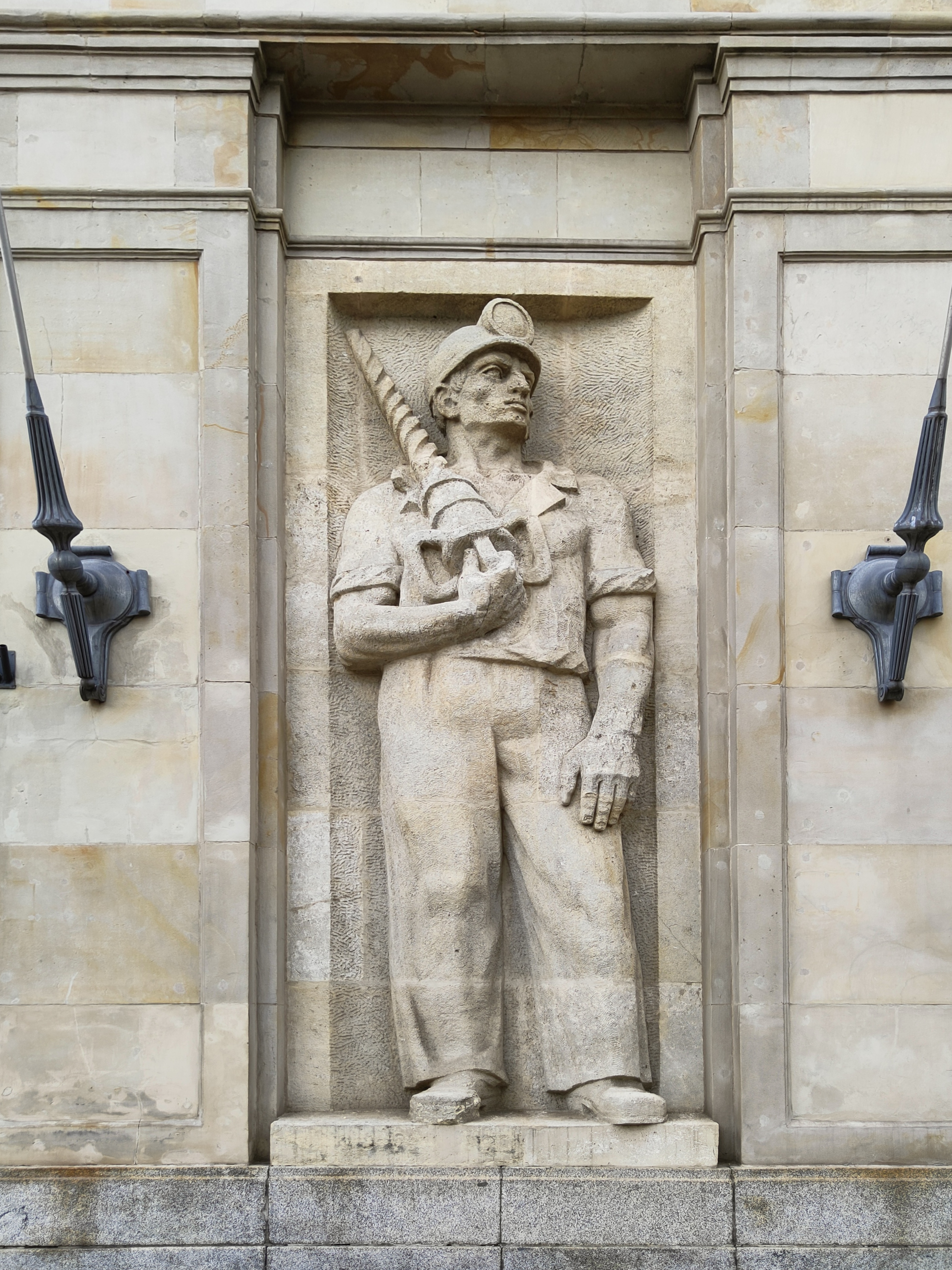
One of the reliefs featuring a labourer
