= Krucza =

Neighbourhood of Warsaw, Poland

- Municipal neighbourhood
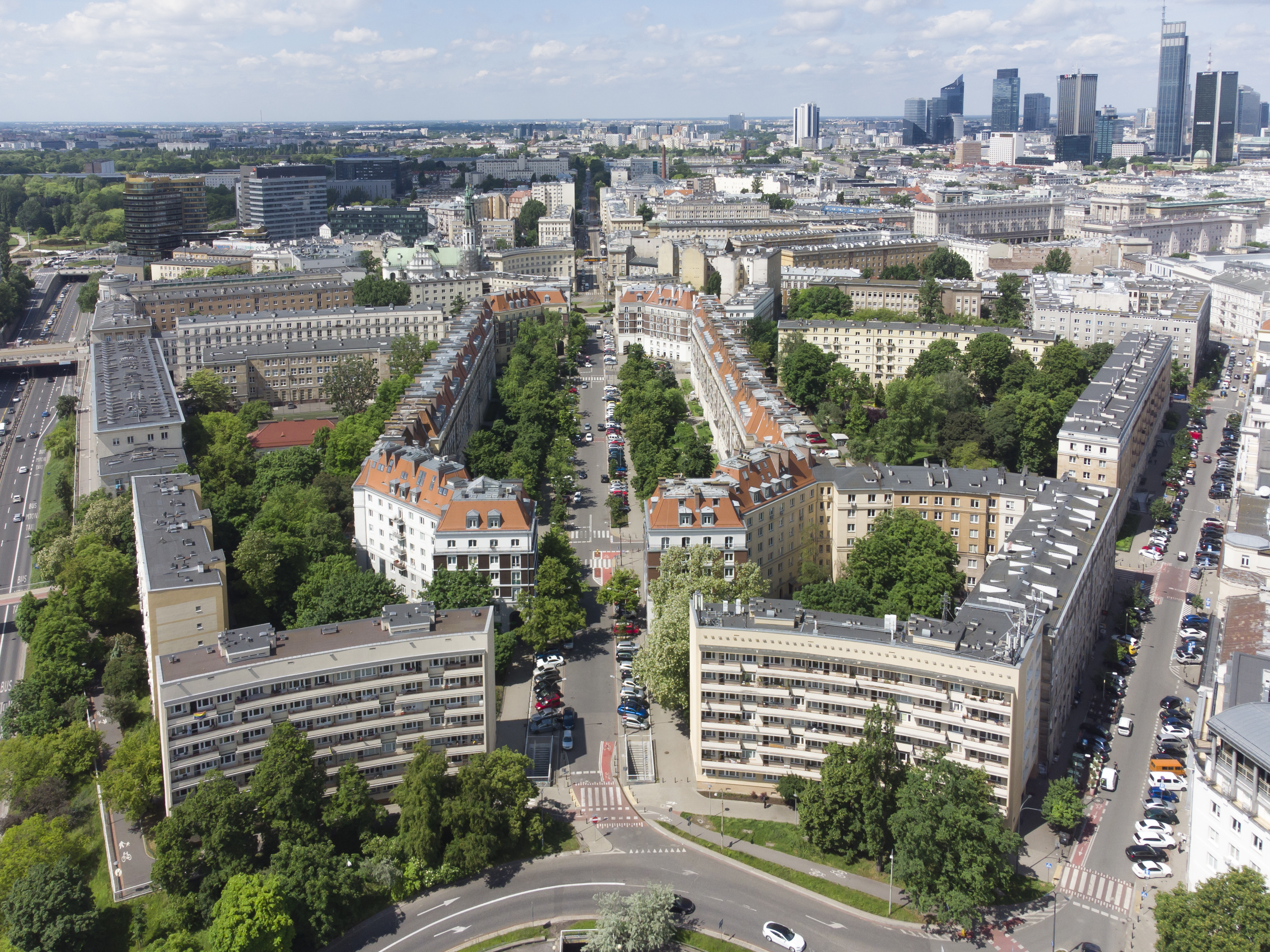
- The neighbourhood of Latawiec, located in Krucza, in 2022.
- Country: Poland
- Voivodeship: Masovian Voivodeship
- City county: Warsaw
- District: Śródmieście
- City Information System area: Śródmieście Południowe
- Establishment: 10 March 2016
- Seat: 27 Jerusalem Avenue, Warsaw

Government
  - Type: Neighbourhood council
  - Council Leader: Paweł Pokorski
- Time zone: UTC+1 (CET)
  - Summer (DST): UTC+2 (CEST)
- Area code: +48 22

Krucza, also designated as the Neighbourhood No. 7, (Note: Polish: Osiedle nr 7, Osiedle nr VII) is a municipal neighbourhood of the city of Warsaw, Poland. It is located within the district of Śródmieście, and administrated by a neighbourhood council. It lies within the City Information System area of Śródmieście Południowe.

== History ==
The municipal neighbourhood of Krucza was established on 10 March 2016.

== Government ==
The neighbourhood government is divided into two organs, the neighbourhood council as the legislative body, and the neighbourhoo management as the executive body. Its seat is located at the 27 Jerusalem Avenue.

== Location and administrative boundaries ==
The neighbourhood boundaries are determined by Jerusalem Avenue to the north, Nowy Świat Street, Three Crosses Square, and Ujazdów Avenue to the east, Armii Ludowej Avenue to the south, and Marszałkowska Street to the west. It is located within the City Information System area of Śródmieście Południowe.
