= Music (Gosławski) =

Sculpture by Józef, Wanda and Stanisław Gosławski

Coordinates: 52°13′23″N 21°0′51″E

The Music Group
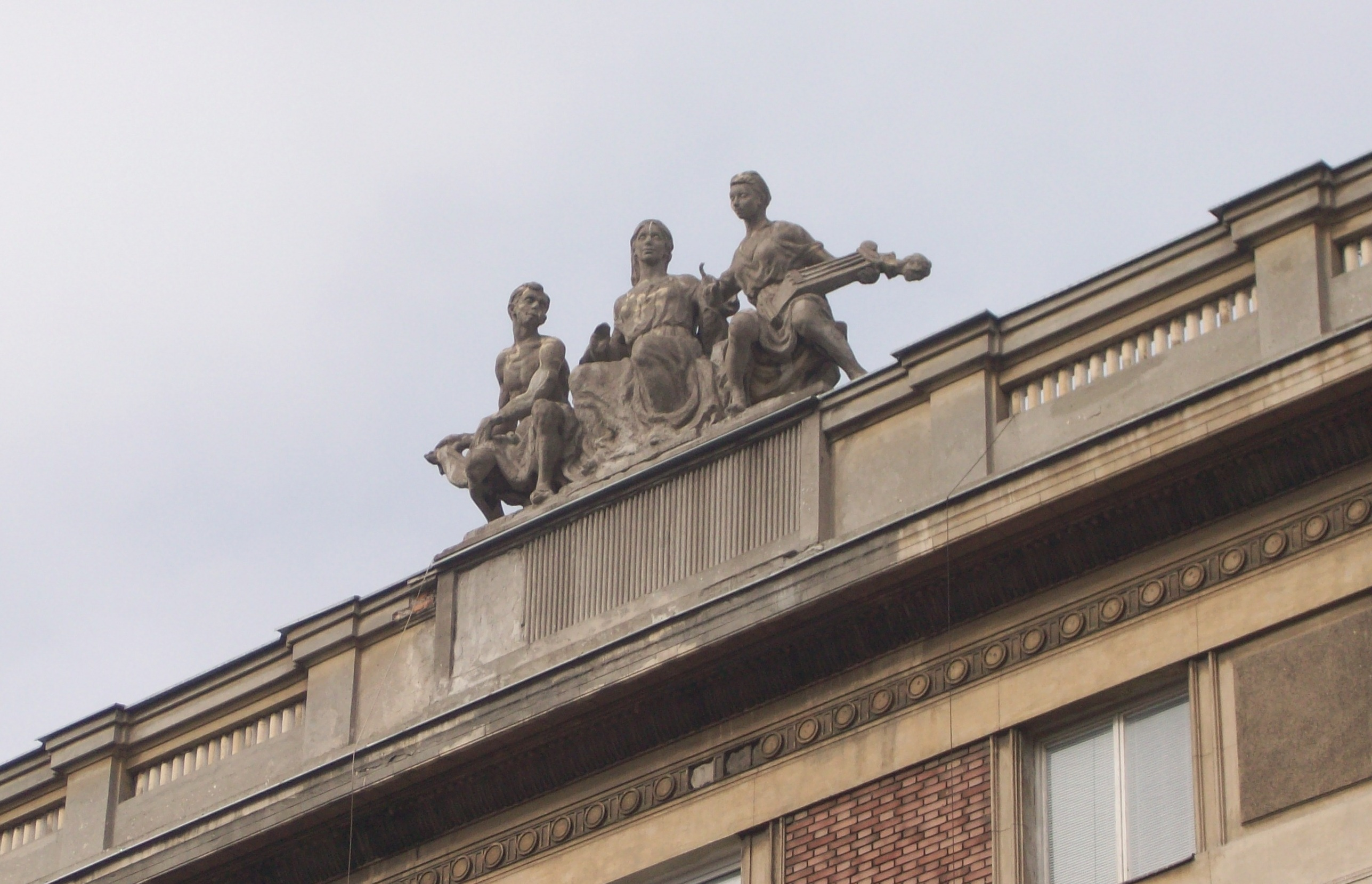
- Artist: Józef Gosławski
- Year: 1952
- Location: Poland, Warsaw

The Music (also known as The Music Group, Polish: Muzyka, Grupa Muzyka) is one of three sculptures located on the roof of the building on Koszykowa Street 34/50 in Warsaw since 1952. The project was chosen after an artistic competition. The monument was designed by Józef Gosławski, but his wife - Wanda - and his brother - Stanisław - helped him with its realization because of the short deadline. Lack of scaffolds, problems with obtaining funds and the short deadline forced the artists to write a letter to the chief architect of Warsaw - Józef Sigalin. After that, the conditions were improved and work was completed on time.

The image of Music Group was on one of the postcards published in 1952. It cost 1.30 zł, of which 0.08 zł was spent on The Social Fund of Reconstruction of Capital City.

== Gallery ==
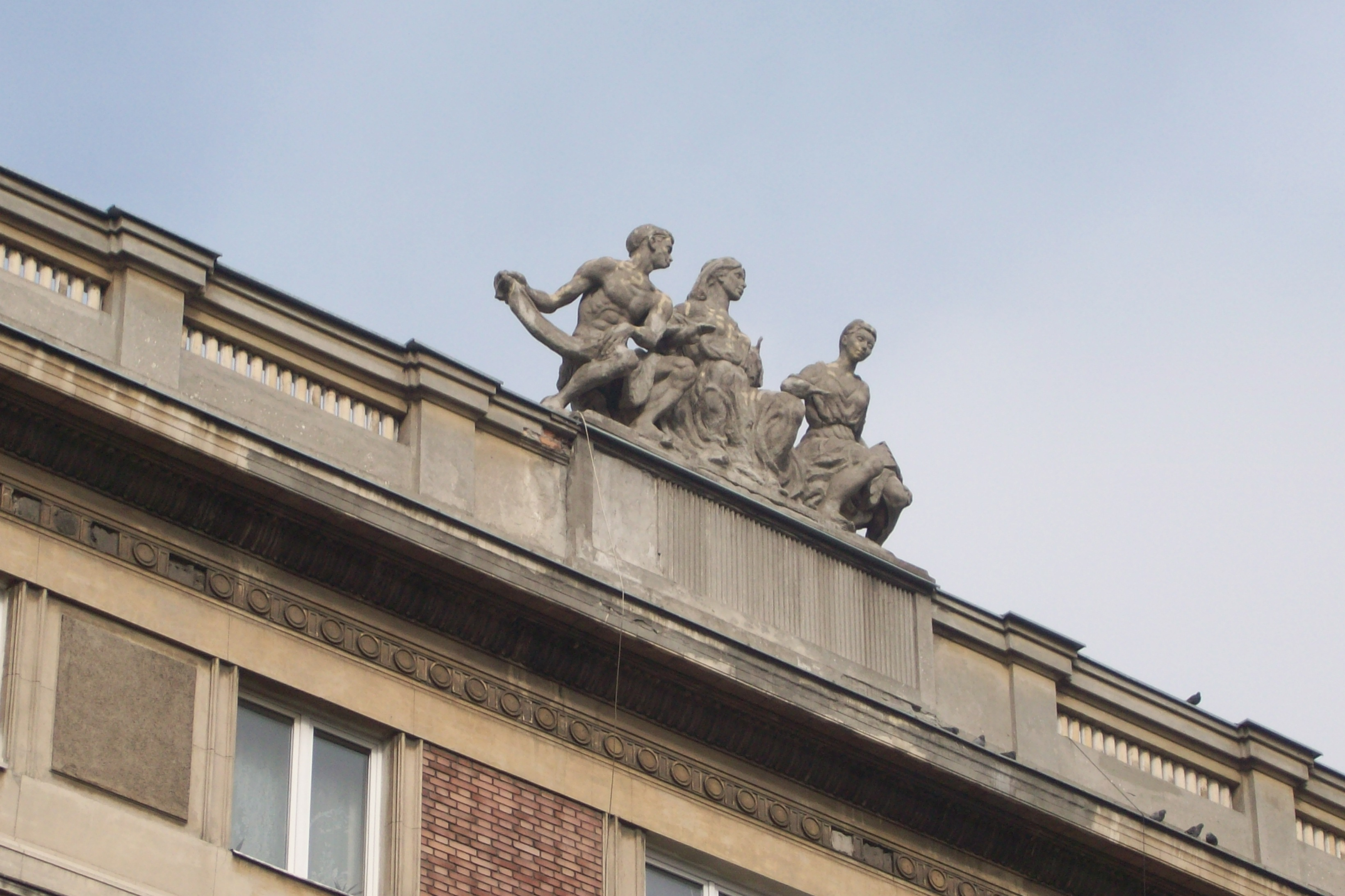

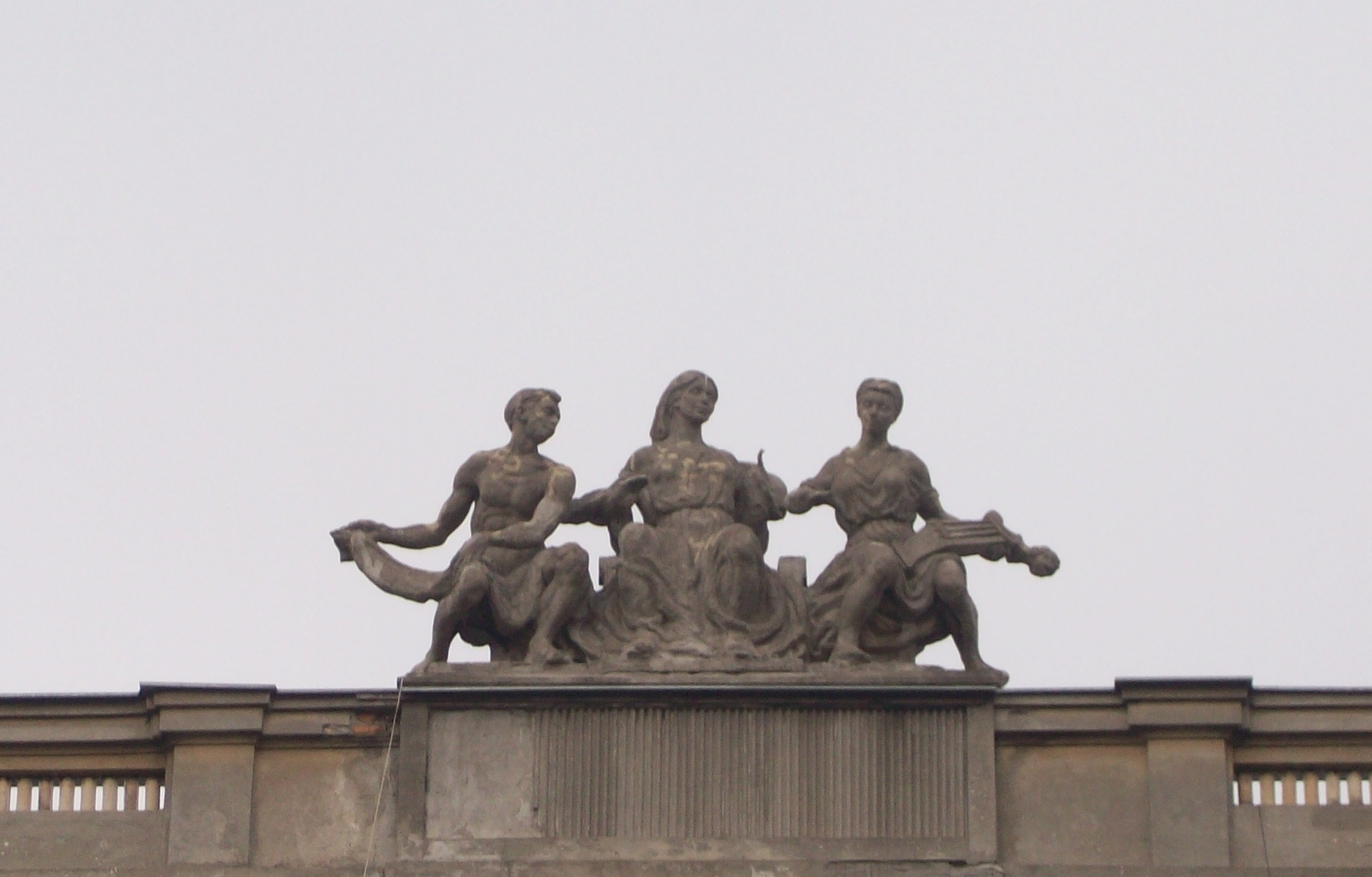

== Bibliography ==
- Sitkowska, Maryla (2009). "Rzeźby Józefa Gosławskiego na MDM-ie w Warszawie". Józef Gosławski. Rzeźby, monety, medale (in Polish). Warszawa: Alegoria. pp. 28–30. ISBN 978-83-62248-00-1.
