= Jan Knothe =

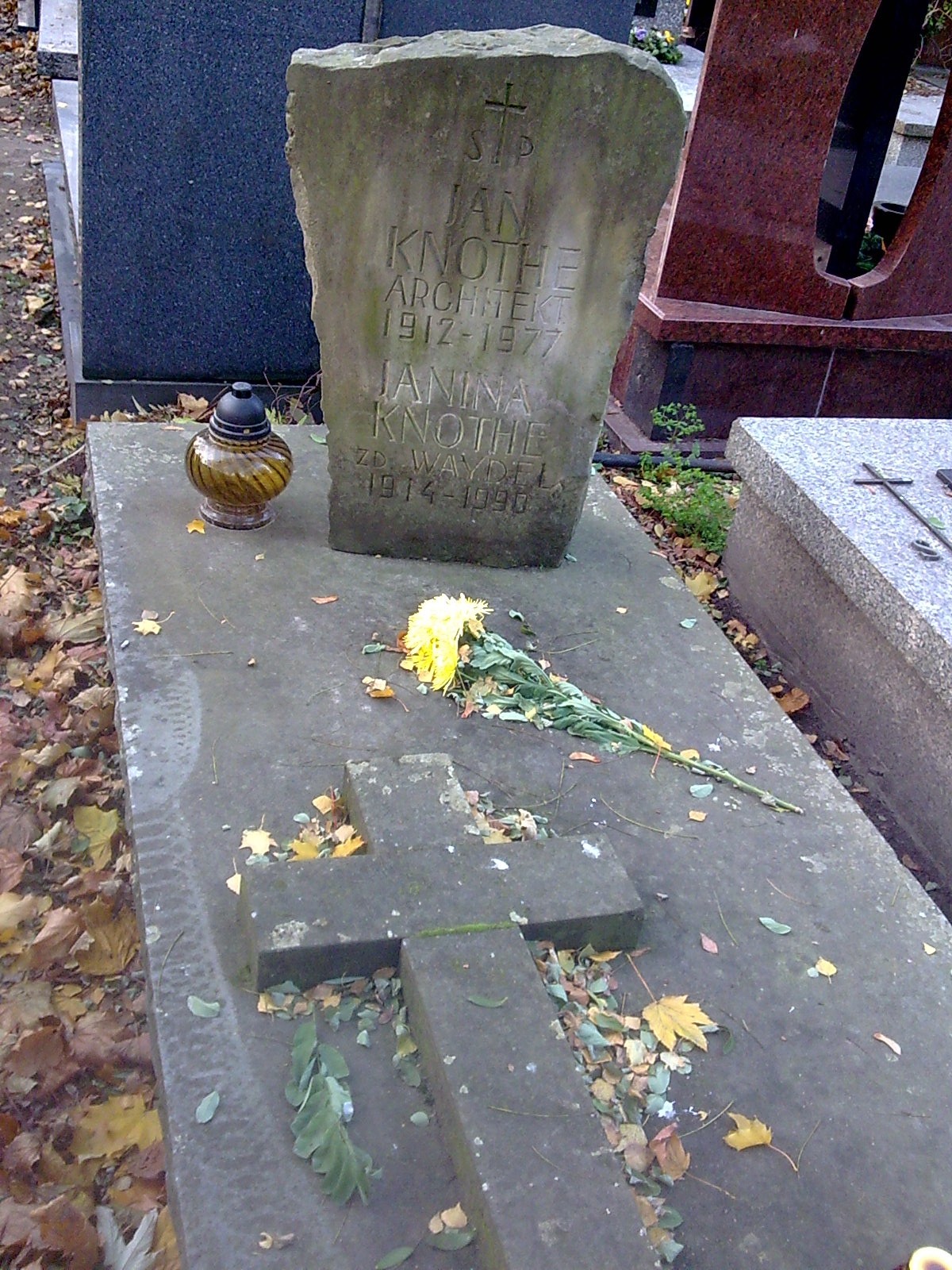
- Jan Knothe Memorial
- Born: February 18, 1912; Winnica, Russian Empire
- Died: December 19, 1977; Warsaw, Poland
- Occupations: Architect, artist, graphic designer, writer, poet, diplomat
- Notable work: Sztuka budowania (1968)
- Awards

Jan Knothe (February 18, 1912 in Winnica – December 19, 1977 in Warsaw) was a Polish architect, artist, graphic designer, writer, poet and diplomat (Belgium, Syria).

== Biography ==
Jan Knothe was an alumnus of the Władysław IV Gymnasium in Warsaw. Studied at the Faculty of Architecture at the University of Technology in Warsaw.

During World War II, as a prisoner of Oflag II-C prisoner-of-war camp, Knothe participated in the prisoners' cultural life. Wrote a sequence of Ramayana-based poems about Warsaw (lost during the camp's evacuation). Having mastered the Mahabharata poetry form, Knothe wrote a narrative poem about The Brave Sailor John Scolvus (Opowieść o dzielnym żeglarzu Janie z Kolna), as well as, with Stanisław Michalski, worked on woodcuts, bookplates and camp stamps.

As an architect, Jan Knothe worked with a team of architects during the decade after World War II, carrying out the most important architectural investments for Warsaw:

- East-West Thoroughfare (W-Z) (1946–49) with Henryk Stamatello, Józef Sigalin, Stanisław Jankowski, Zygmunt Stępiński
- Marszałkowska Dzielnica Mieszkaniowa (MDM) (1949–52) with Stanisław Jankowski, Józef Sigalin, Zygmunt Stępiński
- Ministry of Agriculture Edifice (1951–55) with Jan Grabowski, Stanisław Jankowski

Knothe was the laureate of many construction competitions during the years following World War II: co-author of the Mausoleum-Monument of Victory, Piłsudski Square, Ministry of Industry, SPOŁEM and PZM Headquarters, Warsaw-Okęcie Airport (1947 building), reconstruction of St. Alexander's Church, Powszechny Dom Handlowy and the Ministry of Agriculture.

Knothe inter alia illustrated the Six Year Plan to Rebuild Warsaw (Sześcioletni Plan Odbudowy Warszawy) (Książka i Wiedza 1950). He was also an assistant at the Drawing Department of the Faculty of Architecture at the University of Technology in Warsaw, headed by Zygmunt Kamiński. Created his own artistic style, entwining thick hatches with clusters of dots.

Jan Knothe is the author of a placard about Warsaw from 1952.
