= Stanisław Jankowski =

Polish architect and resistance fighter (1911–2002)

- Stanisław Michał Jankowski
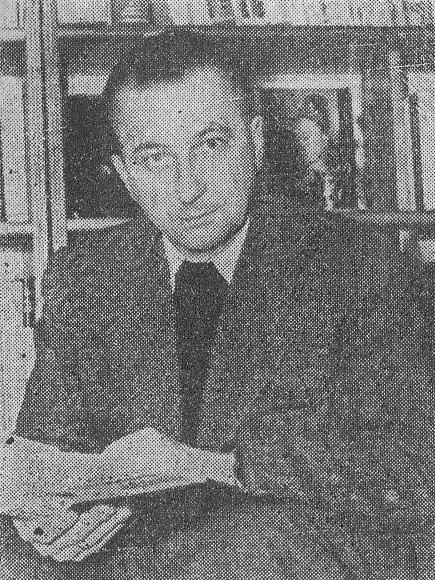
- Born: September 29, 1911; Warsaw, Congress Poland
- Died: March 5, 2002 (aged 90); Warsaw, Poland
- Resting place: Evangelical–Augsburg Cemetery, Warsaw
- Citizenship: Poland
- Education: Warsaw University of Technology
- Occupation: Architect
- Awards: Honorary citizenship of Warsaw, Honorary Fellowship of the American Institute of Architects
- Practice: Warsaw Reconstruction Office
- Projects: Reconstruction of Warsaw, Chimbote, and Skopje, East–West Route, Warsaw, Memorial Route of Jewish Martyrdom and Struggle

Stanisław Jankowski (code name: "Agaton") was an SOE agent and Polish resistance fighter during World War II, and an architect thereafter, who played a prominent role in the post-war reconstruction of Warsaw.

== Life ==
Jankowski was a student and later, assistant lecturer in architecture at the Warsaw University of Technology in the Second Polish Republic before World War II. He was mobilized as an officer during the German invasion of Poland of 1939. He was captured by the Soviets in eastern Poland but escaped and joined the Polish Armed Forces in the West. Jankowski became an SOE agent (Cichociemny) and in 1942 was parachuted back into occupied Poland, where he became an expert document forger (codename "Agaton", helped set up the Home Army's document forgery department, codenamed "Agaton section") for the Polish resistance. In 1944, he took part in the Warsaw Uprising (commander of 'Agaton Platoon', member of the Batalion Pięść in the Radosław Group). He was taken prisoner by the Germans. After the end of the Uprising, he became an aide-de-camp to General Tadeusz Bór-Komorowski, the leader of the Polish Home Army. After the war, he resumed his career as an architect. He took part in the reconstruction of Warsaw; many of his projects took him abroad (to Iraq, Peru, Yugoslavia and Vietnam).

== Autobiography ==
- Stanisław Jankowski 'Agaton' (1980). Z fałszywym Ausweisem w prawdziwej Warszawie: Wspomnienia 1939-1946. Warszawa: Biblioteka Syrenki (memoires)

== Honours and awards ==
Jankowski was the recipient of many military and civilian medals and awards:

Virtuti Militari
Cross of Valour, twice
Order of the Banner of Labour Class II
Knight's Cross of the Order of Polonia Restituta
Home Army Cross
three National Arts Awards
Gold Medal for Reconstruction of Warsaw
Honorary Citizen of Warsaw (1995)
