= Writers' House =

Apartment building in Warsaw, Poland

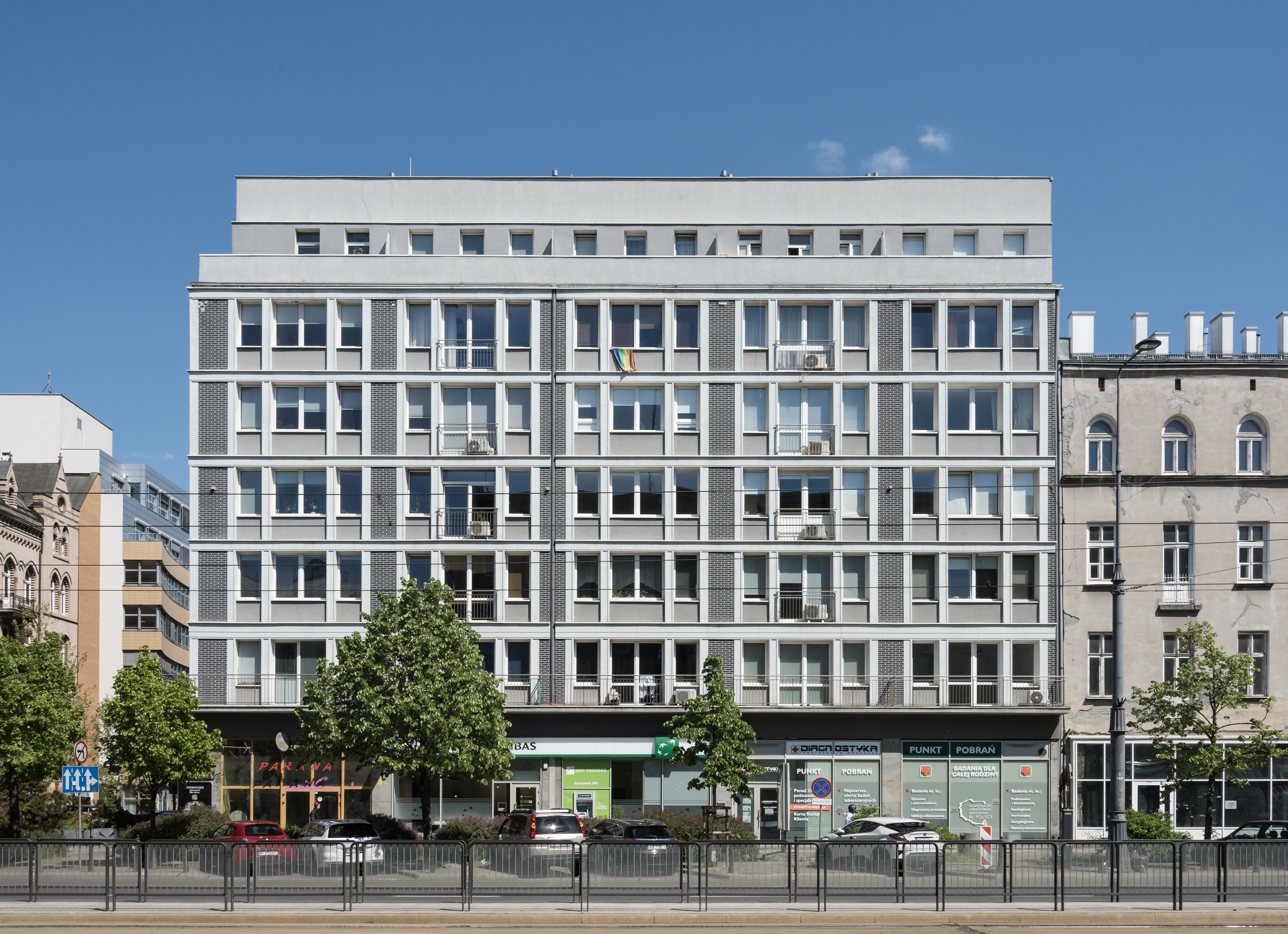
- The building in 2023.
- Interactive map of the Writers' House area

General information
- Type: Multifamily residential
- Architectural style: Socialist realism
- Location: Downtown, Warsaw, Poland, 68/70 Marszałkowska Street
- Coordinates: 52°13′31″N 21°00′54″E
- Construction started: 1959
- Completed: 1960

The Writers' House (Polish: Dom Pisarzy) is an unofficial name of a socialist realist multifamily residential building in Warsaw, Poland, at 68/70 Marszałkowska Street, next to the corner with Skorupki Street. Opened in 1960, the building is known as a historic residence of numerous artists, scientists, and diplomats.

== History ==
The building was constructed between 1959 and 1960, and designed in socialist realist style, meant be reminiscent of the Marshal Residential District. It was built in place of a former tenement house from the turn of 20th century, designed by Edward Goldberg. It shared a twin design of the nearby Taubenhaus Tenement.

An identical socialist realist multifamily residential building was built in the 1960s at 74 Marszałkowska Street.

The building became residence of numerous artists, scientist, and diplomats, including Maria Dąbska, Julia Hartwig, Zbigniew Herbert, Adam Kępiński, Arkadiusz Konarzewski, Artur Międzyrzecki, Danuta Płocka-Zabłocka, Bogusław Śmiechowski, and Ryszard Szawłowski, among others. It was also visited by Nobel Prize winners Henry Kissinger and Czesław Miłosz. In the early 1960s, the apartment of Hartwig i Międzyrzecki, became a gathering salon. The building was later referred to as the Writers' House by Adam Pomorski, the chairperson of the Polish division of the PEN International.

The building was renovated and modernized in 2012. The same year, on its façade was installed a commemorative plaque dedicated to Artur Międzyrzecki, and in 2021, it was followed with a plaque of Julia Hartwig.

On 25 August 2016, the building was placed on a municipal heritage list of Warsaw.

== Design ==
The multifamily residential building is designed in socialist realist style, meant be reminiscent of the Marshal Residential District, which was built a few years prior to it. The building has the base shape the letter L, and construction made from reinforced concrete and façade lied with ceramic bricks.
