= Taubenhaus Tenement =

Historic house in Warsaw, Poland

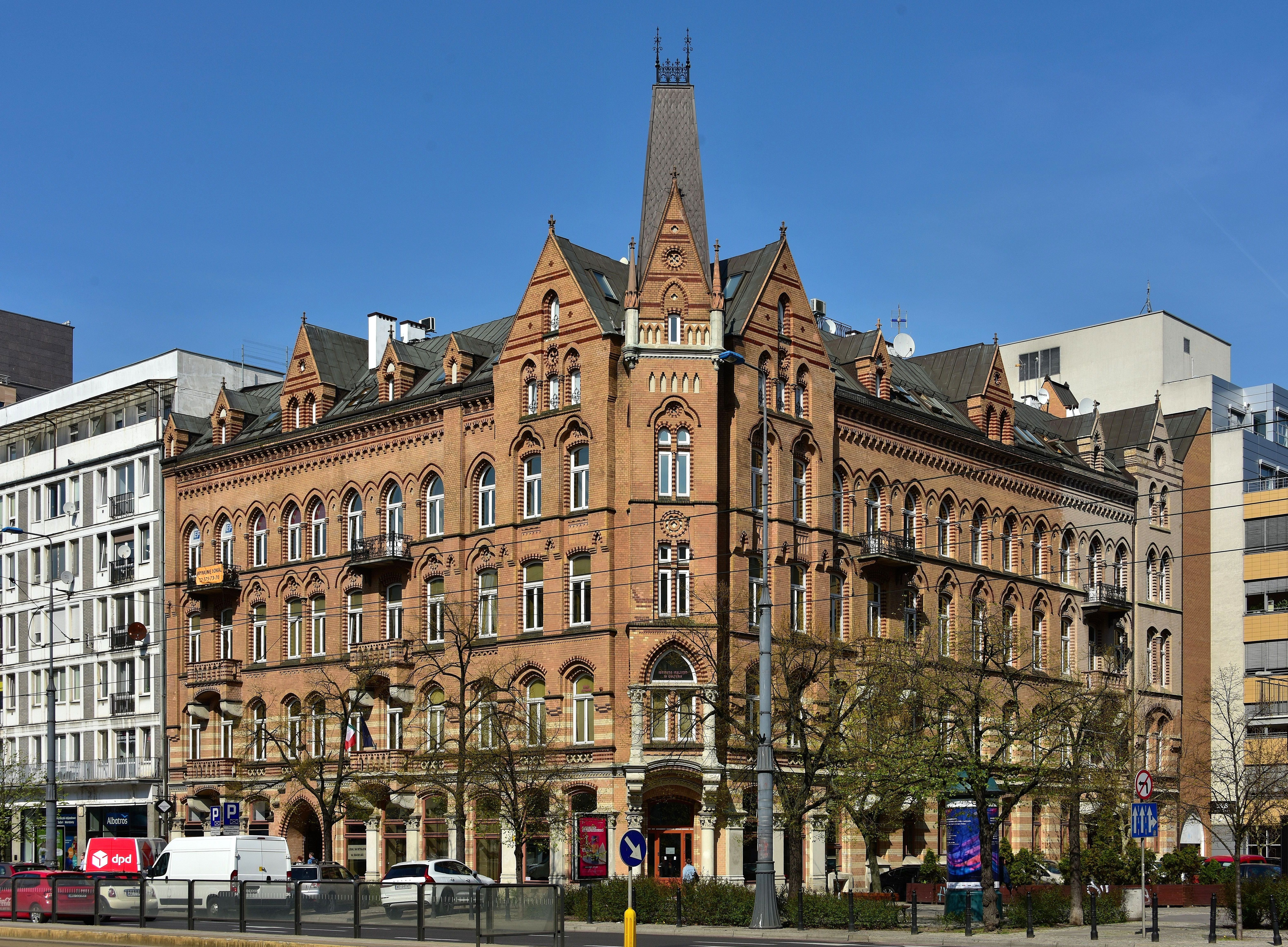
- The building in 2019.
- Interactive map of the Taubenhaus Tenement area

General information
- Type: Tenement house
- Architectural style: Gothic Revival
- Location: Downtown, Warsaw, Poland, 72 Marshal Street
- Coordinates: 52°13′32″N 21°00′53″E
- Completed: 1898

Design and construction
- Architect: Edward Goldberg

The Taubenhaus Tenement (Polish: Kamienica Taubenhausa) is a Gothic Revival tenement house in Warsaw, Poland, located at 72 Marshal Street, within the South Downtown neighbourhood. It was built in 1898 and designed by Edward Goldberg.

== History ==
The building was designed Edward Goldberg, and constructed in 1898. Nearby, at 68/70 Marshal Street, was built an identical tenement house. Currently in it place stands the Writers' House.

The building was partially destroyed during the Second World War. It was rebuilt with changed design. It was renovated in 1998, and restored to its pre-war design.

In 1965, the building was entered into the heritage list.

Since 2001, it houses the headquarters of the Italian Cultural Centre.
