= Hussar Tenement =

Tenement residential building in Warsaw, Poland

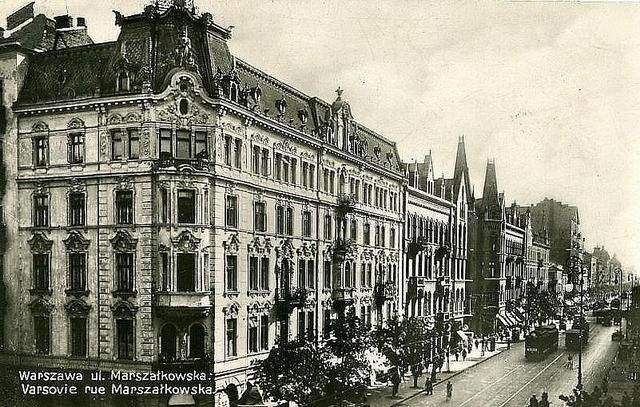
- The Hussar Tenement. Photography taken before 1939.
- Interactive map of the Hussar Tenement area

General information
- Status: Destroyed
- Type: Residential building
- Location: Warsaw, Poland, 74 Marszałkowska Street
- Coordinates: 52°13′34″N 21°00′52″E
- Completed: 1898
- Demolished: after 1944

The Hussar Tenement (Polish: Kamienica „pod Husarzem”) was a tenement residential building, located in the city of Warsaw, Poland, at 74 Marszałkowska Street, near the crossing with Hoża Street. The building was built in 1898. The name refers to the statue of John III Sobieski in hussar armor on top of the building.

The building was destroyed during the Second World War, and removed after 1944. In its place, in the 1960s, was built a multifamily residential building designed in the socialist realism style, which exists to the present day.

== History ==
The Hussar Tenement was built in place where previously was located the Klemens Bernaux Palace, a building designed by architect Szymon Bogumił Zug and built in around 1790 for banker Klemens Bernaux. The building was overbuilt in the mid-19th century. The next owner of the building was Samuel A. Fraenkel, and prior to 1863, it was sold to Leopold Kronenberg, who was owner of the Union Tobacco Products Factory, which was located on the other side of the street. In 1895, the building, together with attached garden, was sold to investor Władysław Frąckiewicz, who then sold the area as plots of land for construction of new tenements.

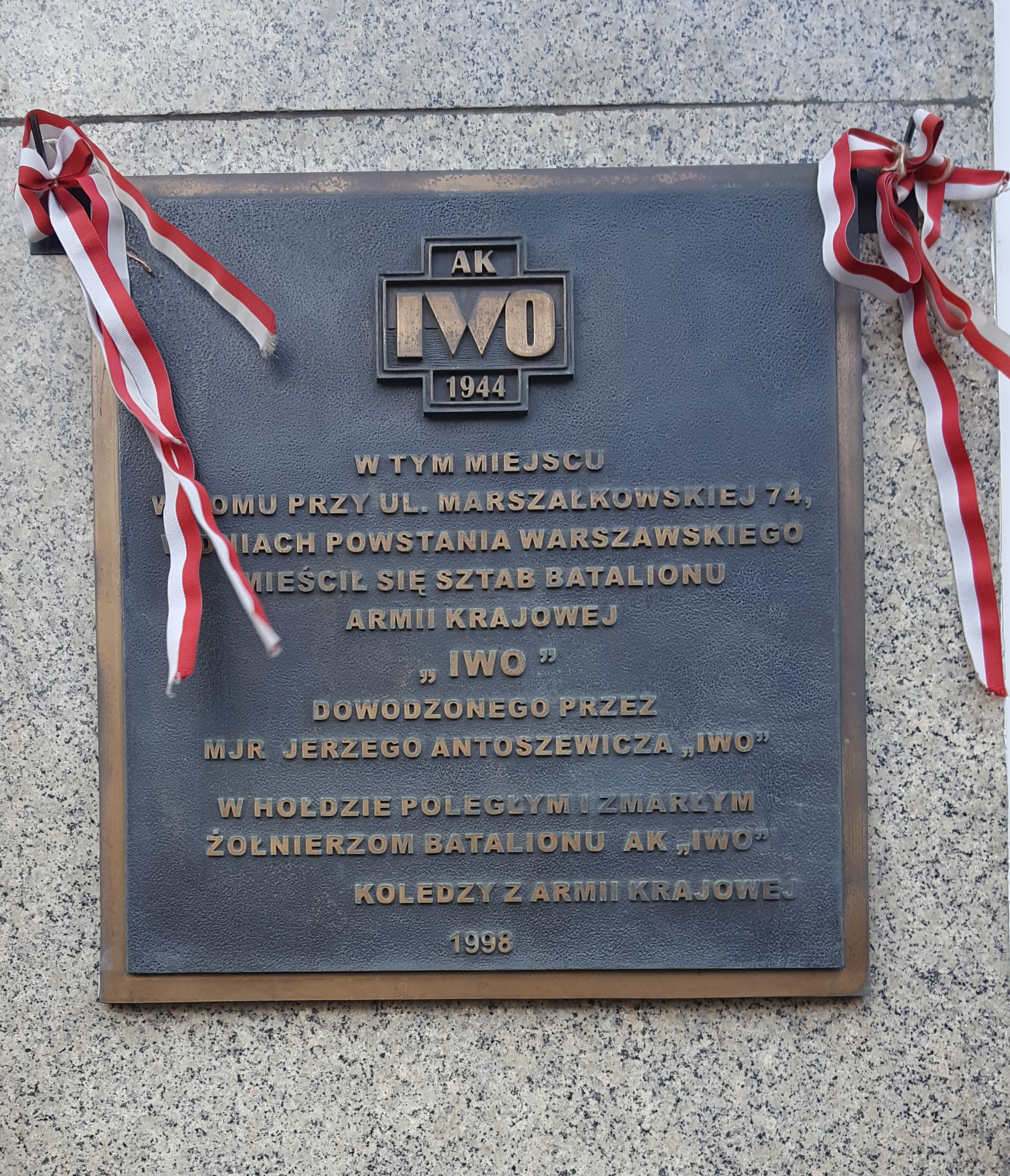
The plaque in memory of the Iwo Battalion

The construction of the Pod Husarzem Tenement was finished in 1898. It was located at 74 Marszałkowska Street, near the crossing with 31 Hoża Street. The corner of the building featured a sculpture depicting John III Sobieski, King of Poland and Grand Duke of Lithuania, wearing hussar armour, with two women holding shields, sitting at his feet.

In 1944, during the Warsaw Uprising, in the Second World War, the building housed the headquarters of the Iwo Battalion of the Home Army.

The building was destroyed during the Second World War, and was removed after 1944. In the 1960s, in its place was built a multifamily residential building designed in the socialist realism style, which exists to the present day. In 1998, on its front wall was placed a plaque commemorating the former location of the headquarters of the Iwo Battalion.
