= 74 Marszałkowska Street multifamily residential building =

Socialist realist multifamily residential building in Warsaw, Poland

74 Marszałkowska Street multifamily residential buildin
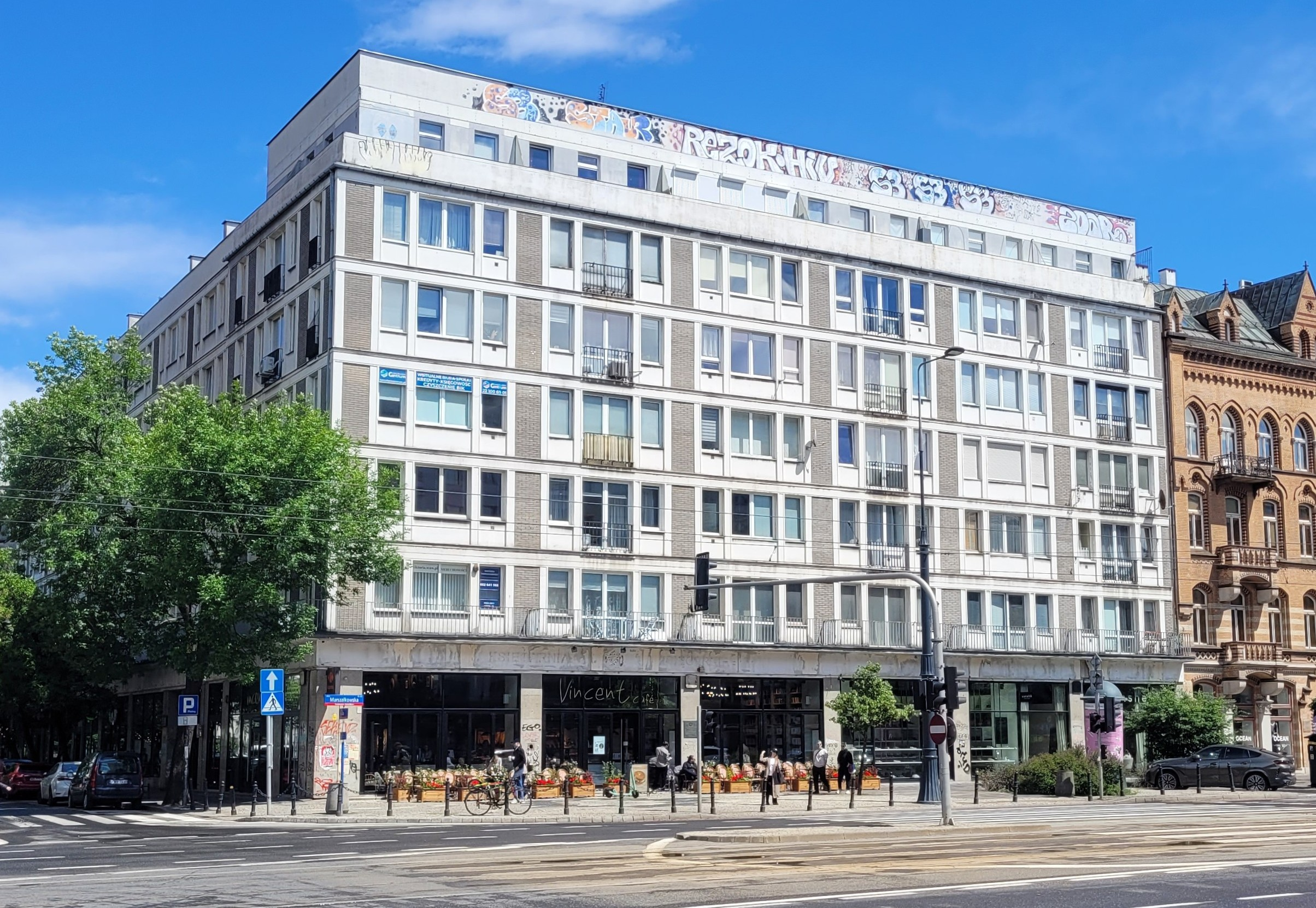
- The building in 2026, as seen from Marszałkowska Street.
- Interactive map of the 74 Marszałkowska Street multifamily residential buildin area

General information
- Type: Multifamily residential building
- Architectural style: Modernism; socialist realism
- Location: Downtown, Warsaw, Poland, 74 Marszałkowska Street; 29/31 Hoża Street
- Coordinates: 52°13′33.8″N 21°00′52.5″E
- Completed: 1960s

Technical details
- Floor count: 7

Design and construction
- Architects: Zbigniew Karpiński; Halina Woźniak

The 74 Marszałkowska Street multifamily residential building is a socialist realist modernist multifamily residential building, located in the city of Warsaw, Poland, within the neighbourhood of South Downtown. It is placed at the corner of 74 Marszałkowska Street and 29 and 31 Hoża Street. It was designed by Zbigniew Karpiński and Halina Woźniak, and built in the 1960s. Since 2016, it is included on the municipal heritage list of the city of Warsaw.

== History ==
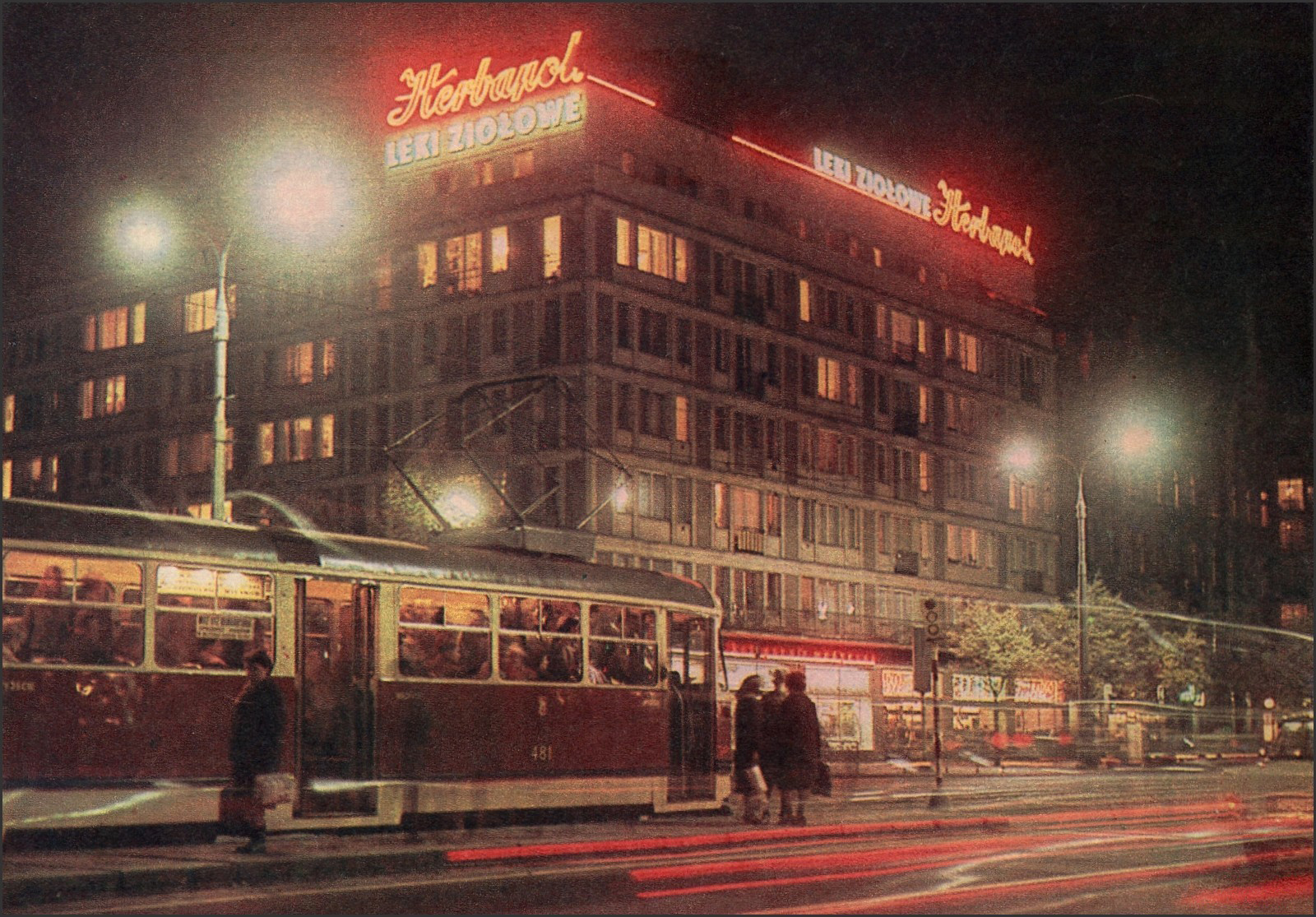
The building in 1968.

The building was constructed in the 1960s. It was designed by Zbigniew Karpiński and Halina Woźniak in socialist realist modernist style, meant to be reminiscent of the Marshal Residential District, which was built a few years prior to it. The latter was itself inspired by the neoclassical architecture. The building was a twin design of the Writers' House built nearby in 1960 at 68 and 70 Marszałkowska Street. It was constructed at the former location of the Hussar Tenement, which was destroyed in 1944 during the Warsaw Uprising in the Second World War. Its ruins were removed after 1944. During the uprising, the building housed the headquarters of the Iwo Battalion of the Home Army. In 1998, a commemorative plaque was installed on the façade of the building at 74 Marszałkowska Street, in dedication to the former headquarters location.

On 25 August 2016, the building was added to the municipal heritage list of the city of Warsaw.

== Design ==
The multifamily residential building has seven storeys, and features socialist realist modernist façade. Its structure is made from reinforced concrete, and the façade is clad with ceramic bricks. The building is placed at 74 Marszałkowska Street, with its eastern wing extending alongside Hoża Street, with address numbers of 29 and 31.

Its façade includes a commemorative plaque, informing of the Hussar Tenement, which formerly stood at the current location of the building, and housed the headquarters of the Iwo Battalion of the Home Army during the Warsaw Uprising in 1944.

== Gallery ==
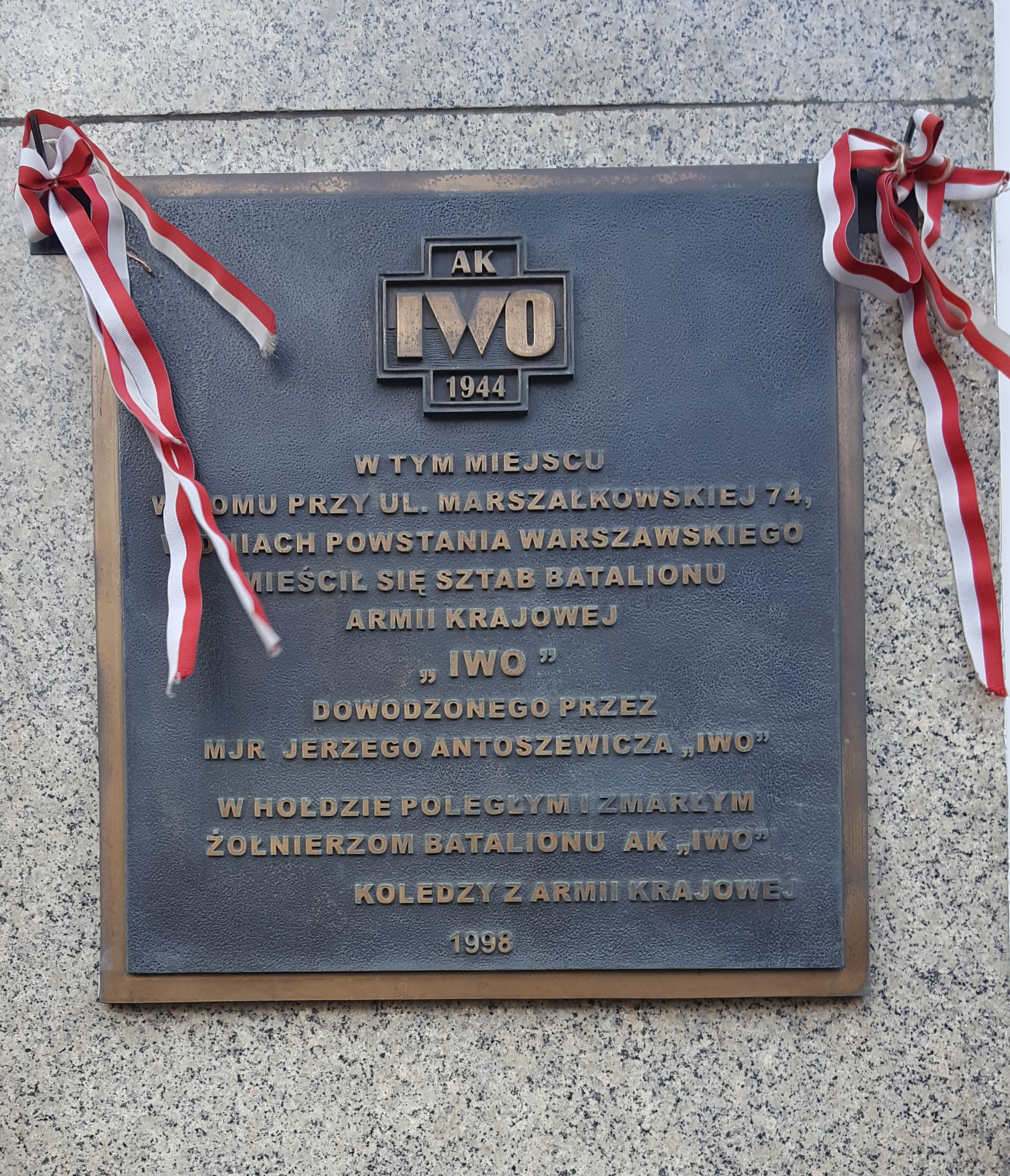
The commemorative plaque dedicated to the headquarters of the Iwo Battalion of the Home Army during the Warsaw Uprising, housed in 1944 at the current location of the building.
