= Mokotów Tollhouses =

Two historical tollhouses in Warsaw, Poland

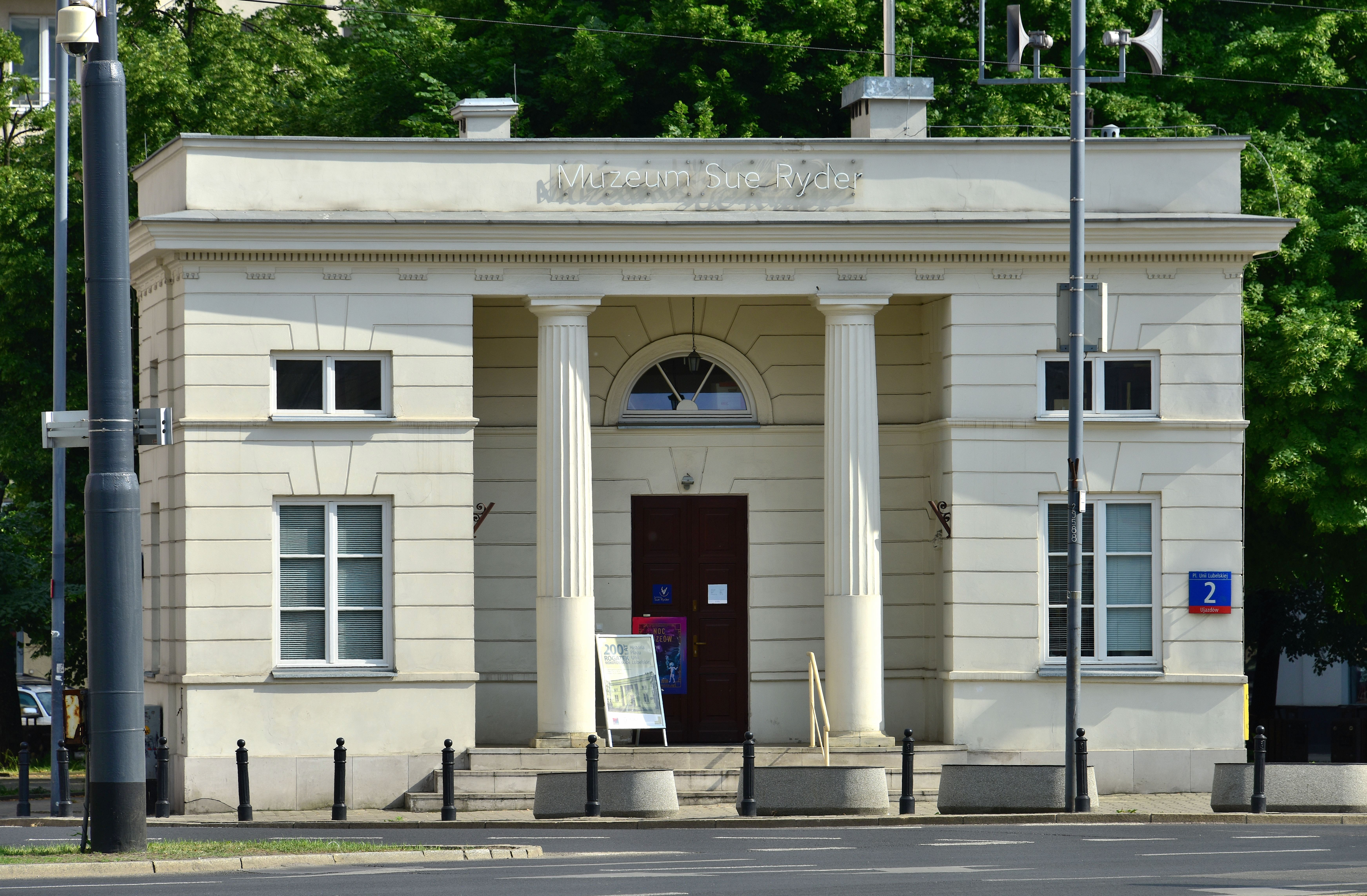
- The east pavilion of Mokotów Tollhouses in 2018.
- Interactive map of the Mokotów Tollhouses area

General information
- Architectural style: Neoclassical
- Location: Warsaw, Poland, 1 and 2 Union of Lublin Square
- Coordinates: 52°12′48″N 21°01′16″E
- Construction started: 1816
- Completed: 1818

Technical details
- Floor count: 1

Design and construction
- Architect: Jakub Kubicki

The Mokotów Tollhouses (Polish pronunciation: [mɔˈkɔ.tuf]; Polish: Rogatki Mokotowskie) are two Neoclassical tollhouse pavilions in Warsaw, Poland, within the Mokotów district. They are placed on both sides of the Puławska Street at the Union of Lublin Square. The tollhouses were designed by Jakub Kubicki and opened in 1818.

== History ==
The first tollhouses in Warsaw appeared after 1770, which coincided with the construction of the Lubomirski Ramparts, a fortifications line surrounding the city. They were placed at the largest roads leading in and outside the city. By the end of the 18th century, tollhouses were present in ten locations, including Mokotów.

Between 1816 and 1823, across the city, new tollhouse buildings were constructed, designed by architect Jakub Kubicki, in the Neoclassical style. In total 9 sets were constructed, each consisting of two identical pavilions. Each set was designed differently.

The Mokotów Tollhouses were constructed between 1816 and 1818. They were placed at the Union of Lublin Square, on both sides of today's Puławska Street. One pavilion housed a tax collector, whole the other, a police officer.

One of the pavilions was damaged in 1944 during the Warsaw Uprising in the Second World War, and renovated afterwards.

In 1965 the building received the status of a protected cultural property. Together with the Grochów Tollhouses, they are the only still remaining historical tollhouses in the city.

On 19 October 2016, a museum was opened in the west pavilion dedicated to Sue Ryder, a British volunteer with Special Operations Executive in the Second World War, and a member of the First Aid Nursing Yeomanry, who afterwards established charitable organisations, notably the Sue Ryder Foundation (now known as simply Sue Ryder).

== Characteristics ==
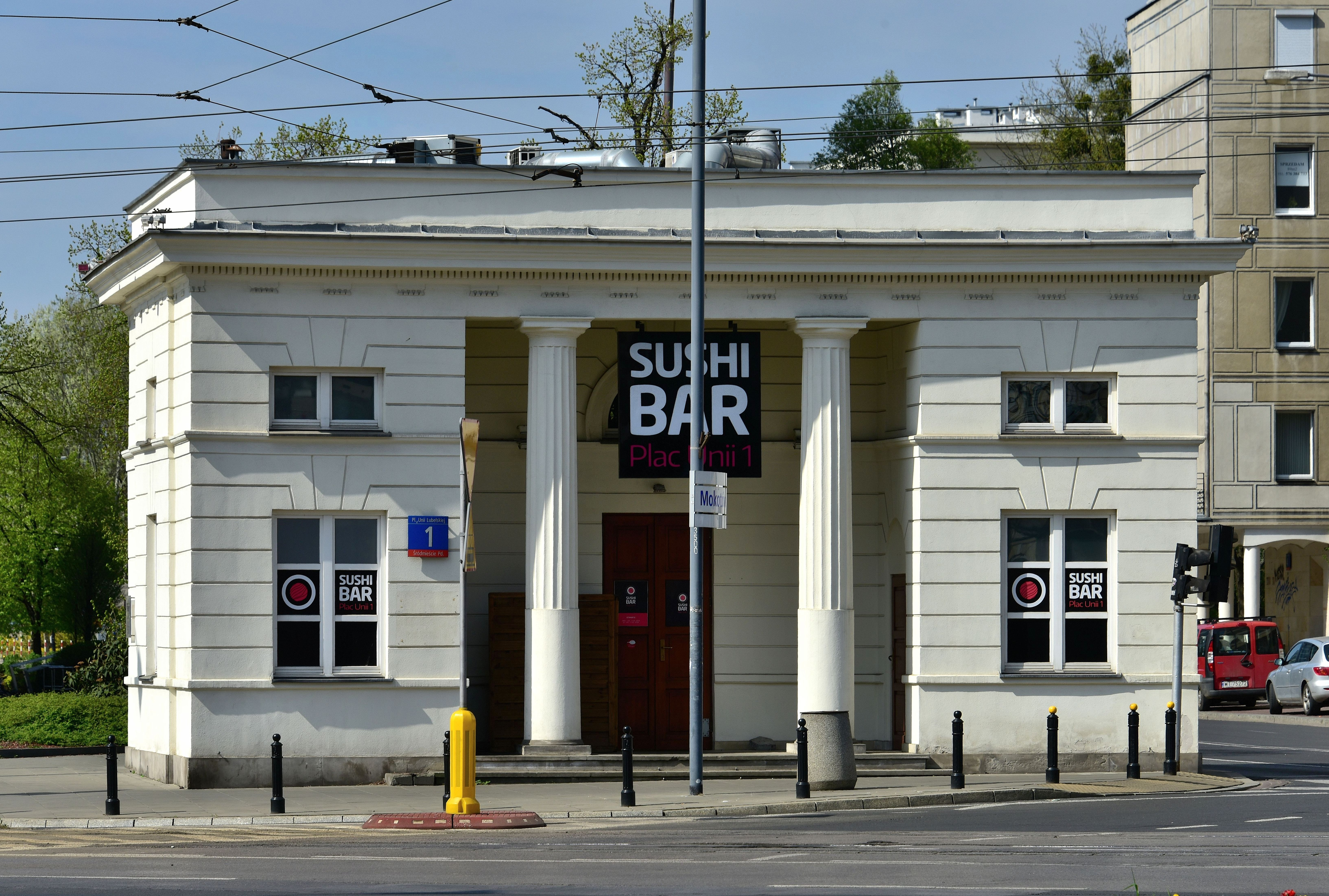
The west pavilion of the Mokotów Tollhouses in 2019.

Mokotów Tollhouses consist of two symmetrical pavilions, placed on both sides of the Puławska Street, at the Union of Lublin Square. They are listed under address numbers 1 for the east pavilion, and 2 for the west pavilion.

Each pavilion has a base in the shape of a curved rectangle, to match the curvature of the roundabout at the Union of Lublin Square. They were designed in the Neoclassical style, with a portico that has two Doric order columns.

The east pavilion houses a museum dedicated to Sue Ryder, a volunteer with Special Operations Executive in the Second World War, and a member of the First Aid Nursing Yeomanry, who afterwards established charitable organisations, notably the Sue Ryder Foundation (now known as simply Sue Ryder).
