= Union of Lublin Square =

Urban square and roundabout in Warsaw, Poland

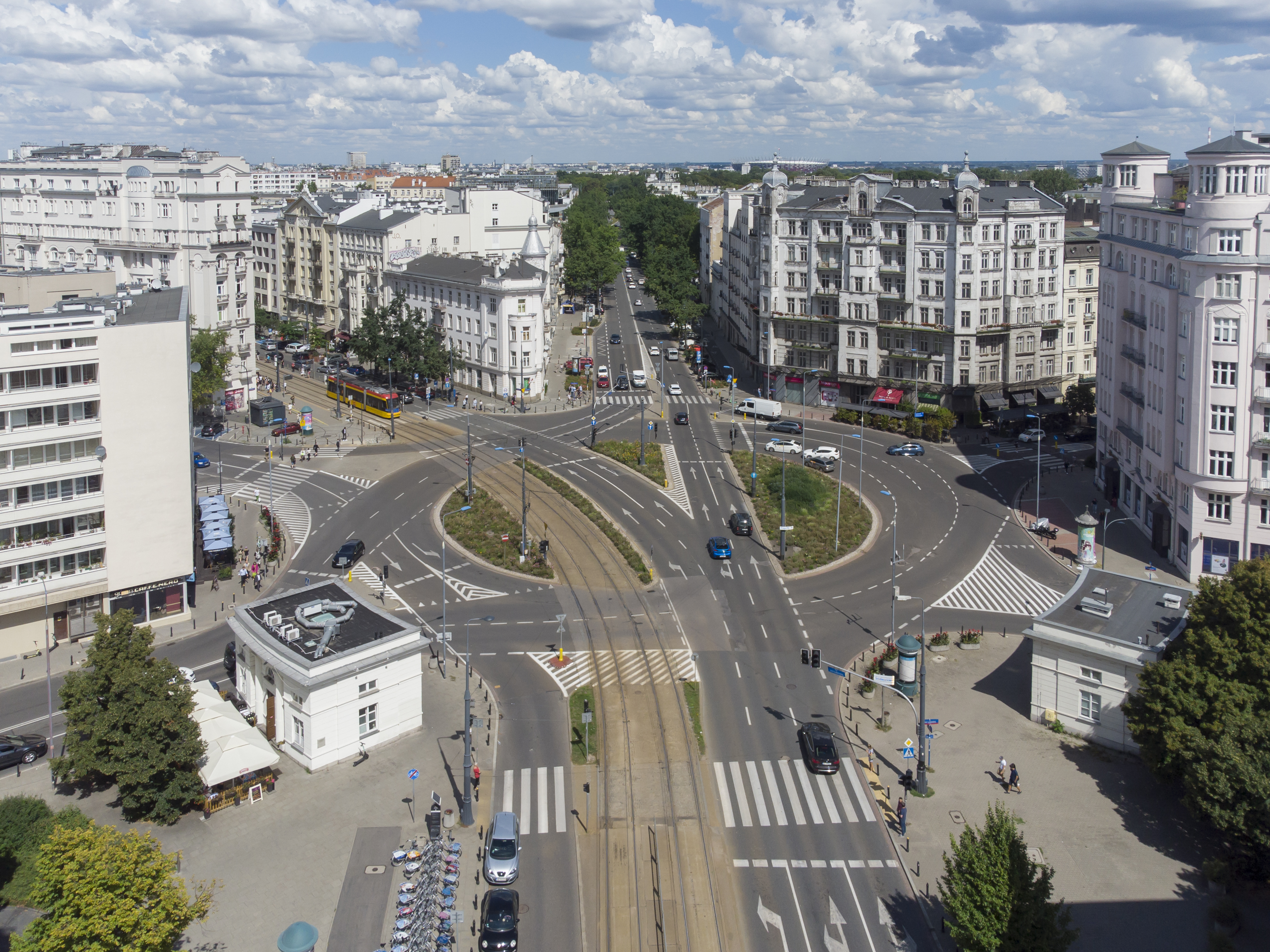
- Union of Lublin Square in 2022

- Location within Warsaw
- Namesake: Union of Lublin
- Location: Downtown, Warsaw, Poland
- Coordinates: 52°12′49″N 21°01′17″E
- North: Polna Street; Marszałkowska Street; Szucha Avenue
- East: Bagatela Street
- South: Puławska Street; Klonowa Street
- West: Boya-Żeleńskiego Street

Construction
- Completion: 1770

Union of Lublin Square (Polish: Plac Unii Lubelskiej) is an urban square and a roundabout in Warsaw, Poland, within the Downtown district. It forms an intersection of Polna, Marszałkowska, Bagatela, Puławska, Klonowa, and Boya-Żeleńskiego Streets, and Szucha Avenue. The square was constructed in 1770. It is surrounded by tenements.

== Name ==
The name of the square refers to the Union of Lublin, an agreement signed in 1569, which led to the creation of the Polish–Lithuanian Commonwealth. The name was given on 1 July 1919, on the 350th anniversary of the signing of the document.

Originally, it was known as the Mokotów Roundabout (Polish: Rondo Mokotowskie) due to its location near the village of Mokotów (now part of Warsaw). Around 1875, it began to be known as Kexholm Square (Polish: Plac Keksholmski; Russian: Кексгольмский площадь, transcription: Keksgol'mskiy ploshchad'), named after the nearby barracks of the Kexholm Life Guard Regiment of the Imperial Russian Army. The unit itself was named after the town of Priozersk in Russia, then known as Kexholm.

== History ==
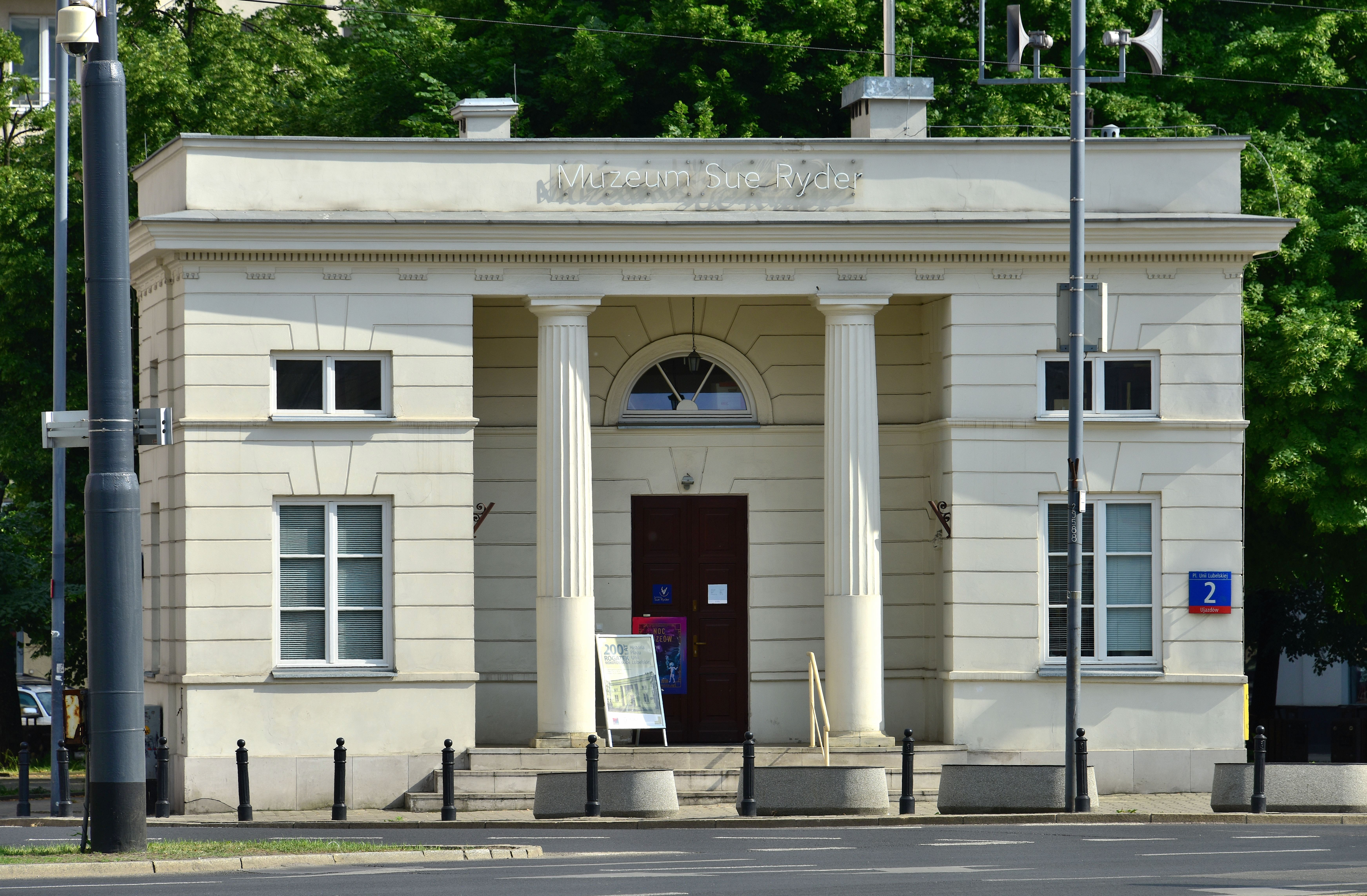
East pavilion of the Mokotów Tollhouses, opened in 1818

The square was developed in 1770 as the southernmost part of the Stanisław Axis, an urban layout made of five circular squares and roads, connecting Warsaw with Ujazdów Castle, developed from the initiative of King Stanisław August Poniatowski. The same year, it was surrounded to the south and west by the Lubomirski Ramparts, a line of fortifications erected around the city.

In 1818, the Mokotów Tollhouses, two entrance buildings to the city, were opened there. They were designed by Jakub Kubicki in the Neoclassical style.

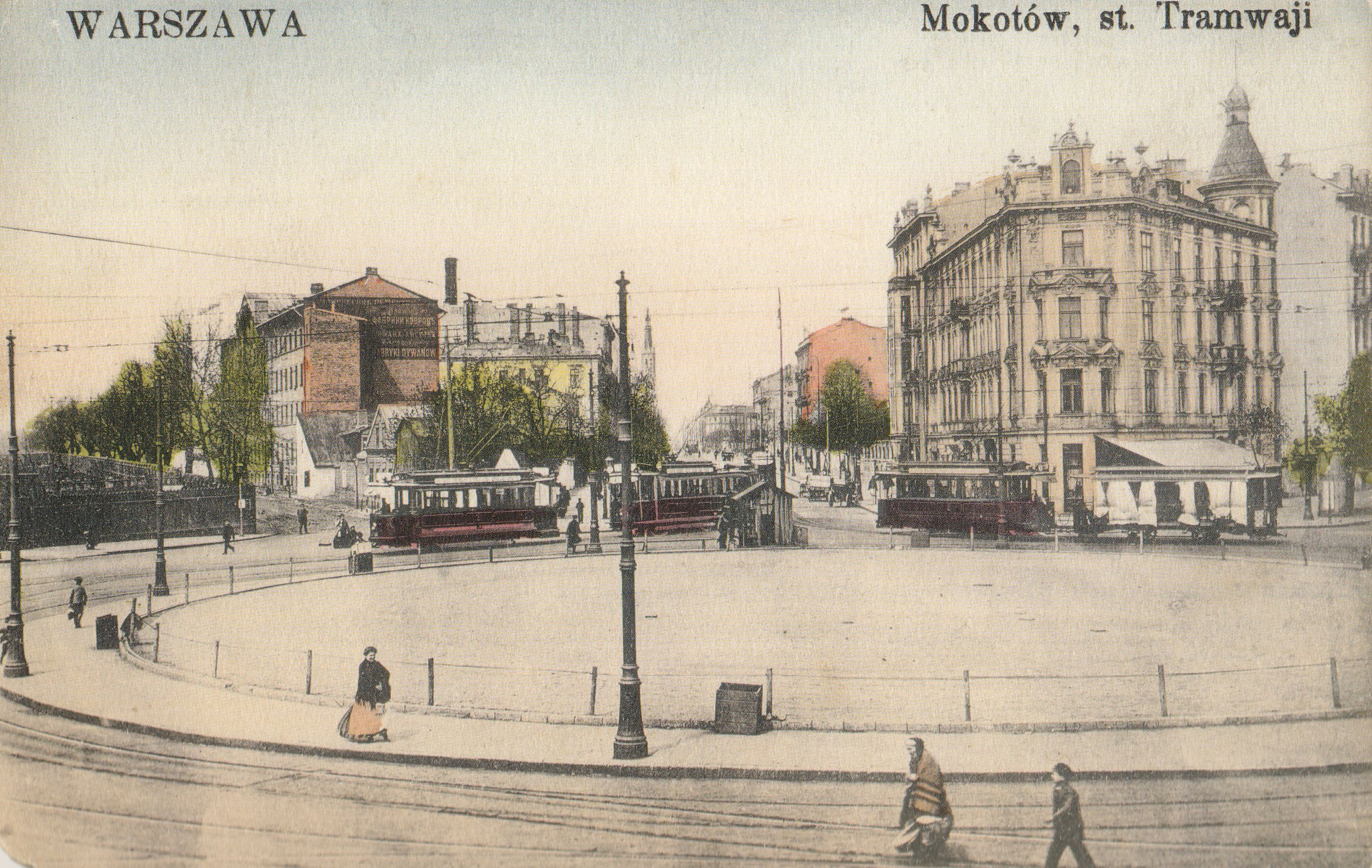
Union of Lublin Square around 1910

In 1881, at the square was constructed a turning loop of a horsecar line, connecting it with Muranów. In 1908, it was replaced with an electric tram line.

In 1892, next to the square, between Puławska and Chocimska Streets, the Warsaw narrow-gauge railway station was opened (later renamed to Warsaw Mokotów in 1930). It was part of two lines operated by the Wilanów Railway. In 1898, a line of the Grójec Commuter Railway was also added there. In 1935, the station was moved further south, to the intersection of Puławska and Odyńca Streets, where it operated until 1938.

At the beginning of the 20th century, six- and eight-storey-tall tenements were constructed around the square. This induced the Kacperski Tenement (1909), Bromke Tenement (1912), Łaski Tenement (1912), and Wielburski Tenement.

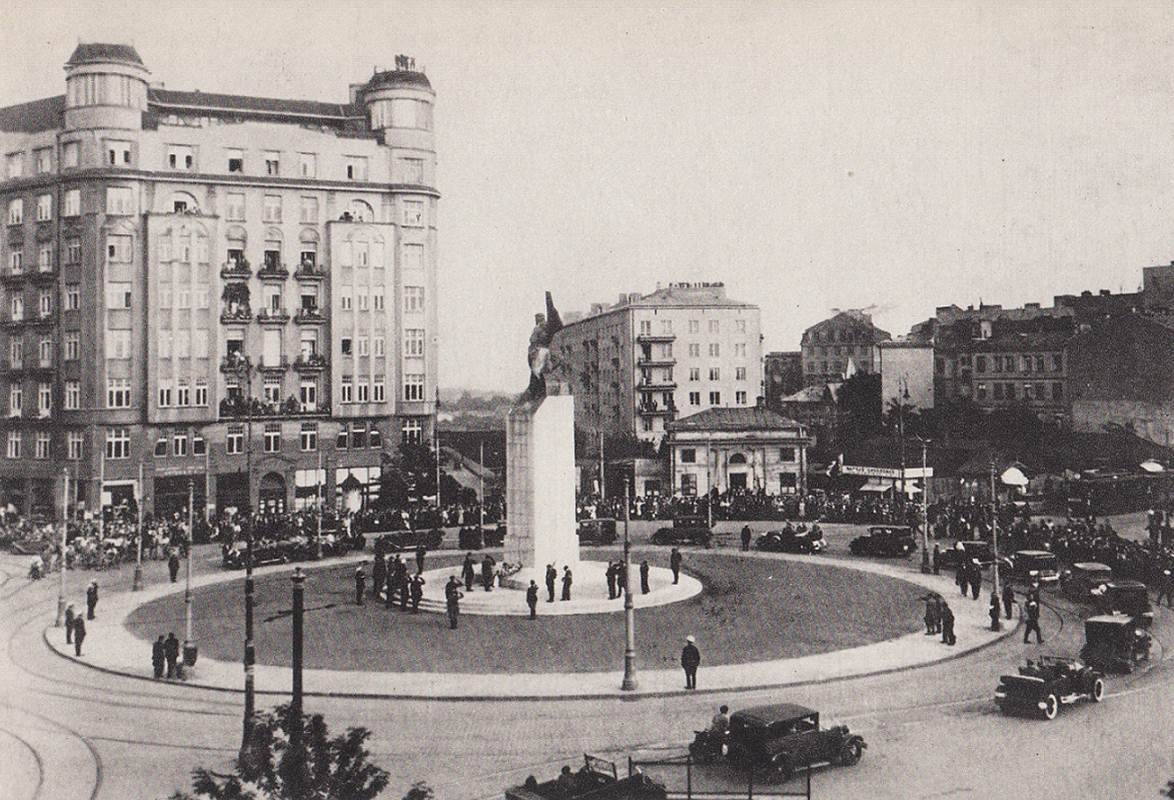
Union of Lublin Square in the 1930s

On 11 November 1932, at the square, the Aviator Monument, designed by Edward Wittig, was unveiled. It consisted of a sculpture depicting an aviator holding a propeller, placed on a tall granite pedestal. It was destroyed by German forces in 1944, during the Second World War. Its replica was unveiled on 9 November 1967 at the intersection of Żwirki i Wigury, Wawelskiej, and Raszyńskiej Streets.

In 1936, at 1 Polna Street near the square, the headquarters building of the Warsaw Fire Guard and its 3rd Division was opened. Later, until 2016, it was the headquarters of the State Fire Service, and currently, it is the headquarters of the city fire department.

In 1938, an office skyscraper designed by Bohdan Pniewski was planned to be constructed next to the square, as the headquarters of Polish Radio. Its construction began in 1939, but it was soon stopped by the outbreak of the Second World War.

In 1940, while under the German occupation, the square became part of the Police District, which was accessible only to the German population, and in which offices of occupant law enforcement structures, as well as the apartments for their employees, were housed. At the square, there was also a station of the tram line no. 0, which was designated only for German passengers.

On 1 August 1944, following the outbreak of the Warsaw Uprising, the square was captured by the Polish resistance fighters from the Jeleń Division. The unit continued fighting in the area for the next few days, unsuccessfully attacking buildings in the Police District. It suffered large loses, and was eventually forced to retreat. In revenge for the attack, the German forces massacred the local Polish population. During and after the uprising, several buildings at the square were destroyed and burned down, including a few tenements and one of two tollhouses. They were rebuilt after the war.

In March 1946, a trolleybus line, connecting the square with the Gdańsk Station, was set up there.

In October 1948, in the Bromski Tenement, at 14 Bagatela Street, the first book and newspaper store of Klub Międzynarodowej Prasy i Książki was opened. The company would eventually form Empik, one of the largest commercial chains in Poland, selling books, international press and media products.

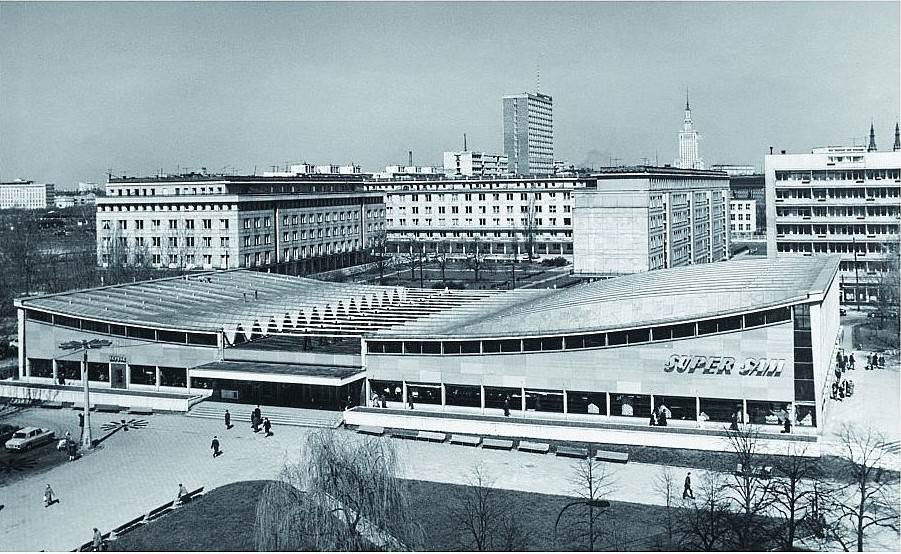
Supersam in 1969

In 1962, at 2 Puławska Street, next to the square, Supersam, the first supermarket in Poland, was opened. It was considered one of the notable examples of modern architecture in Poland. The building was constructed in the location of the former railway station.

In 1964, the roads at the square were renovated and remodeled, with the street layout being changed, and the tram tracks relocated to go through its middle rather than around it. In 1965, it was given the status of a protected cultural property.

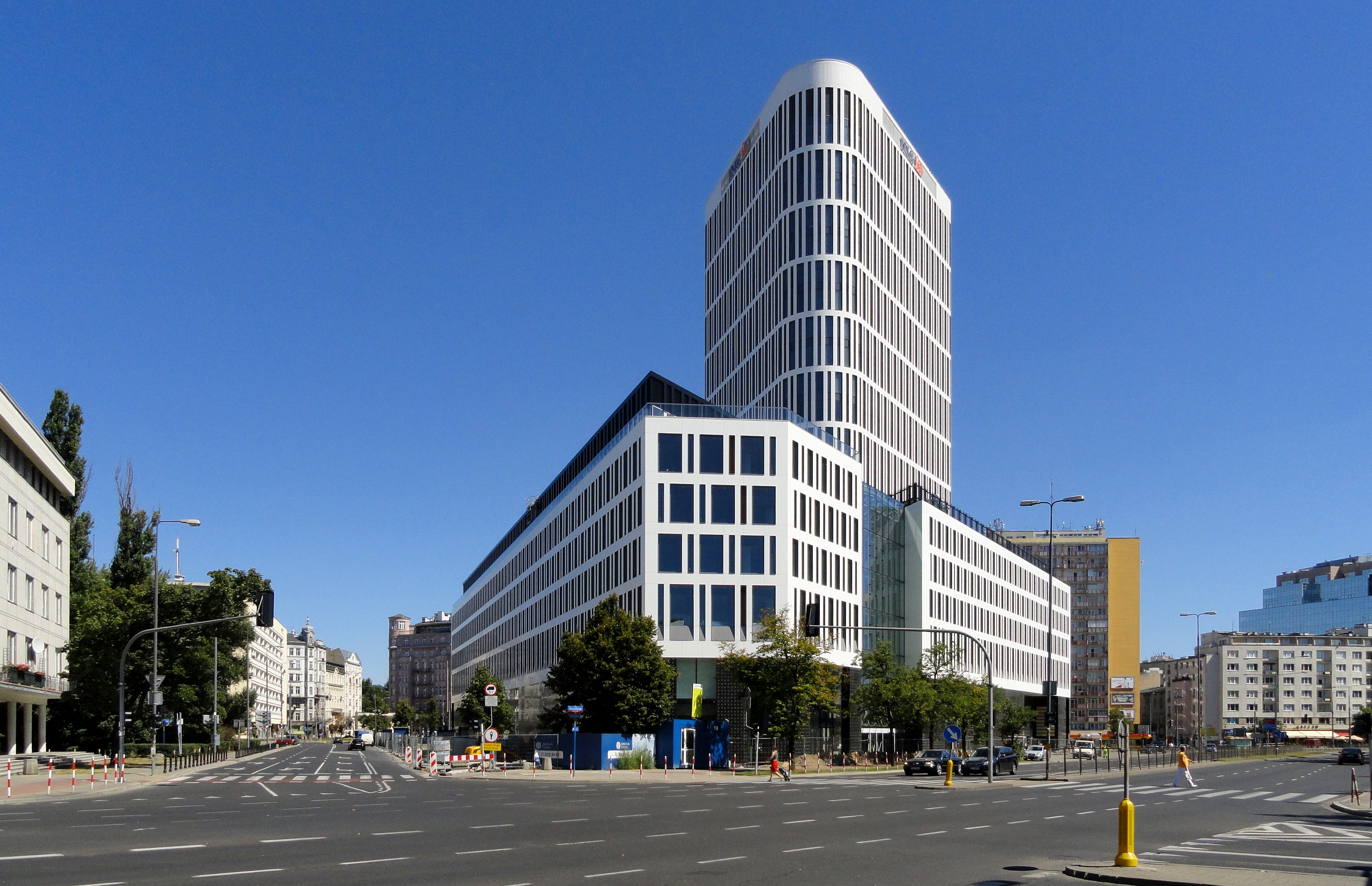
Plac Unii in 2013

On 1 July 1999, a plaque commemorating the Union of Lublin was unveiled on the façade of the building at 15 Bagatela Street. This event took place on the 430th anniversary of the signing, and was funded by the population of Lublin.

Supersam was demolished in 2006. In its place, in 2013, the Plac Unii skyscraper, that serves as an office building and a shopping centre, was opened.

== Characteristics ==
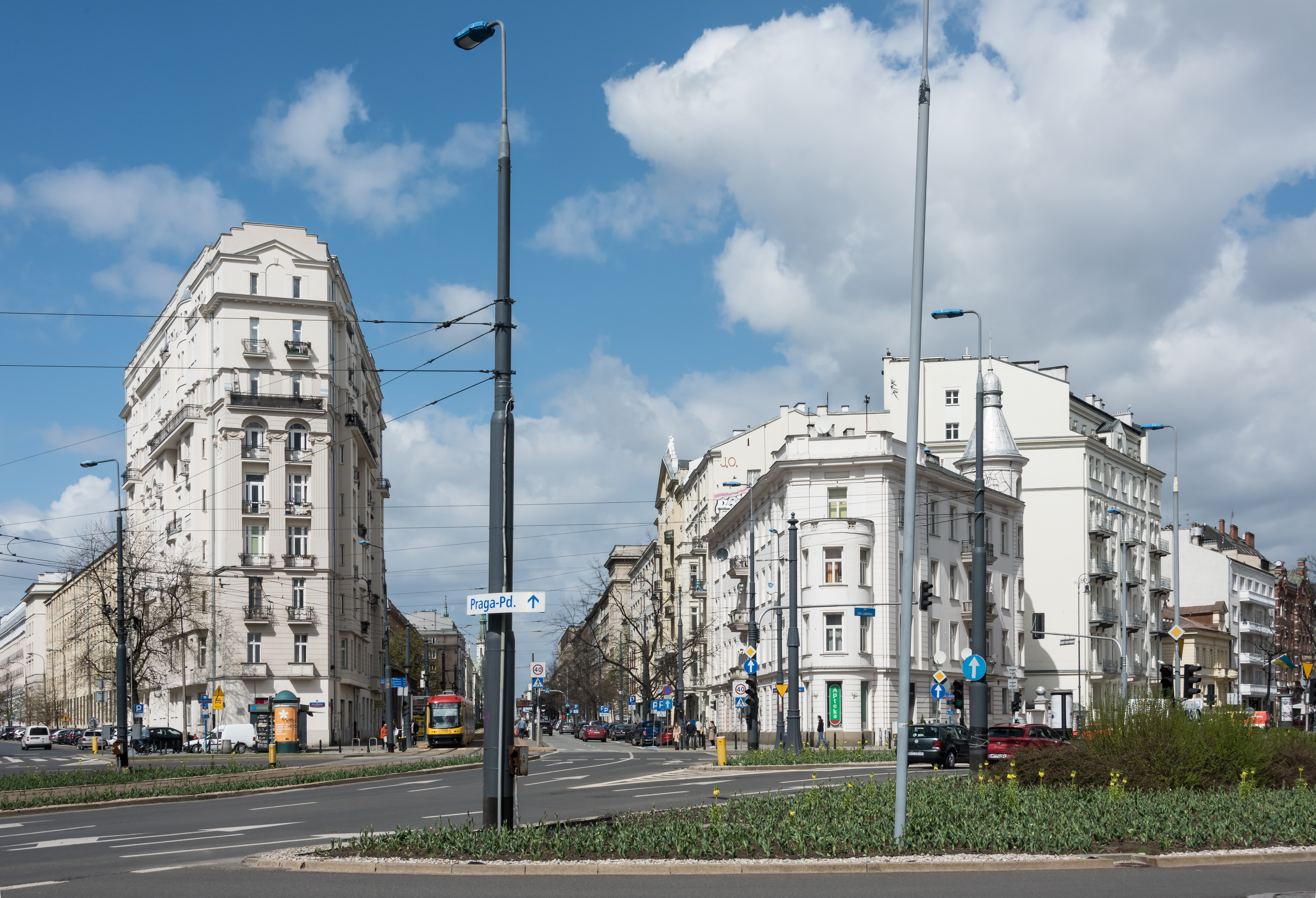
Kacperski and Wielburski tenements near the square in 2021

Union of Lublin Square forms a roundabout at the intersection of Polna Street, Marszałkowska Street, and Szucha Avenue to the north, Bagatela Street to the east, Puławska Street and Klonowa Street to the south, and Boya-Żeleńskiego Street to the west. There are also two roads going through its middle, connecting Puławska Street with Marszałkowska Street and Szucha Avenue. There are also tram tracks going through the middle, connecting Puławska and Marszałkowska Streets.

The square is surrounded mostly by six- and eight-storey-tall tenements, including historical buildings dating from the early 20th century. They are: Bromke Tenement, Łaski Tenement, Kacperski Tenement, and Wielburski Tenement. In the south, on both sides of Puławska Street are the Mokotów Tollhouses, two historical buildings dating from 1818.

Next to the square, at 2 Puławska Street, is the Plac Unii skyscraper, which serves as an office building and a shopping centre. It has a total height of 90 m (295.28 ft).

The square has the status of a protected cultural property.
