= Juda Wielburski Tenement =

Historical neoclassical tenement building in Warsaw, Poland; survived WWII

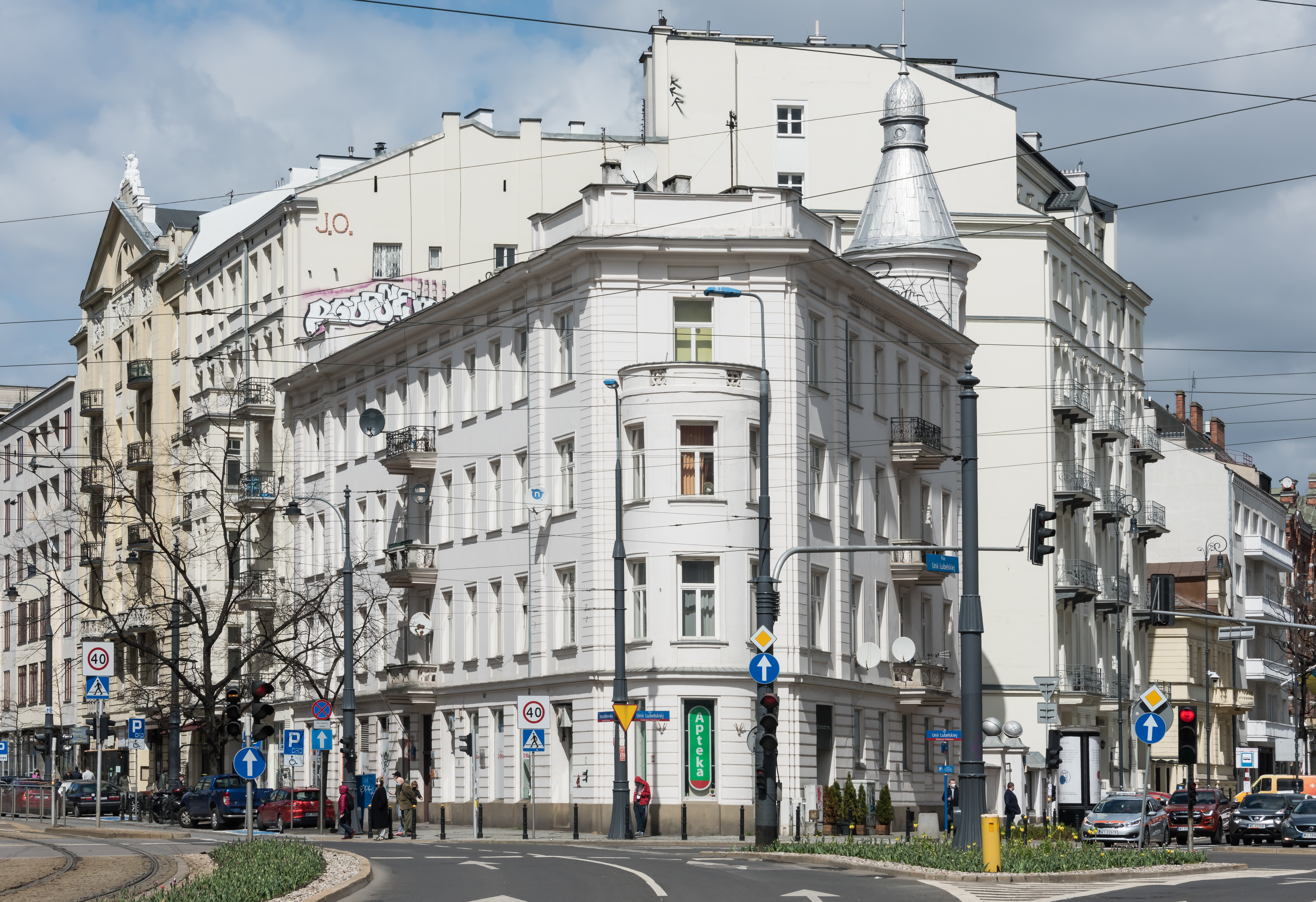
- The Juda Wielburski Tenement in 2021.
- Interactive map of the Juda Wielburski Tenement area

General information
- Status: Completed
- Type: Residential building
- Location: Warsaw, Poland, 2 Marszałkowska Street / 1 Szucha Avenue
- Coordinates: 52°12′51″N 21°01′01.18″E
- Completed: 20th century

The Juda Wielburski Tenement, (Note: Polish: kamienica Judy Wielburskiego) also known as the Potempski Tenement, (Note: Polish: kamienica Potempskich) is a neoclassical tenement house in Warsaw, Poland, located at the corner of 2 Marszałkowska Street and 1 Szucha Avenue? near the Union of Lublin Square, within the South Downtown. It was built in the early 20th century, and currently holds the status of a cultural property.

== History ==
The tenement was built in the early 20th century, during the development of the area around the Union of Lublin Square, and alongside Marszałkowska Street. The building survived the Second World War and the 1944 destruction of Warsaw.

On 24 July 2012, it was given the status of the cultural property protected by the city of Warsaw.

== Characteristics ==
The tenement is placed at the 2 Marszałkowska Street, and 1 Szucha Avenue. It has characteristic white elevation with the subtle neoclassical details. From the side of the Szucha Avenue it has a tower with staircase ended with the tented roof.
