= Marszałkowska Street, Warsaw =

Street in downtown Warsaw

Coordinates: 52°13′45″N 21°00′44″E

Marszałkowska Street
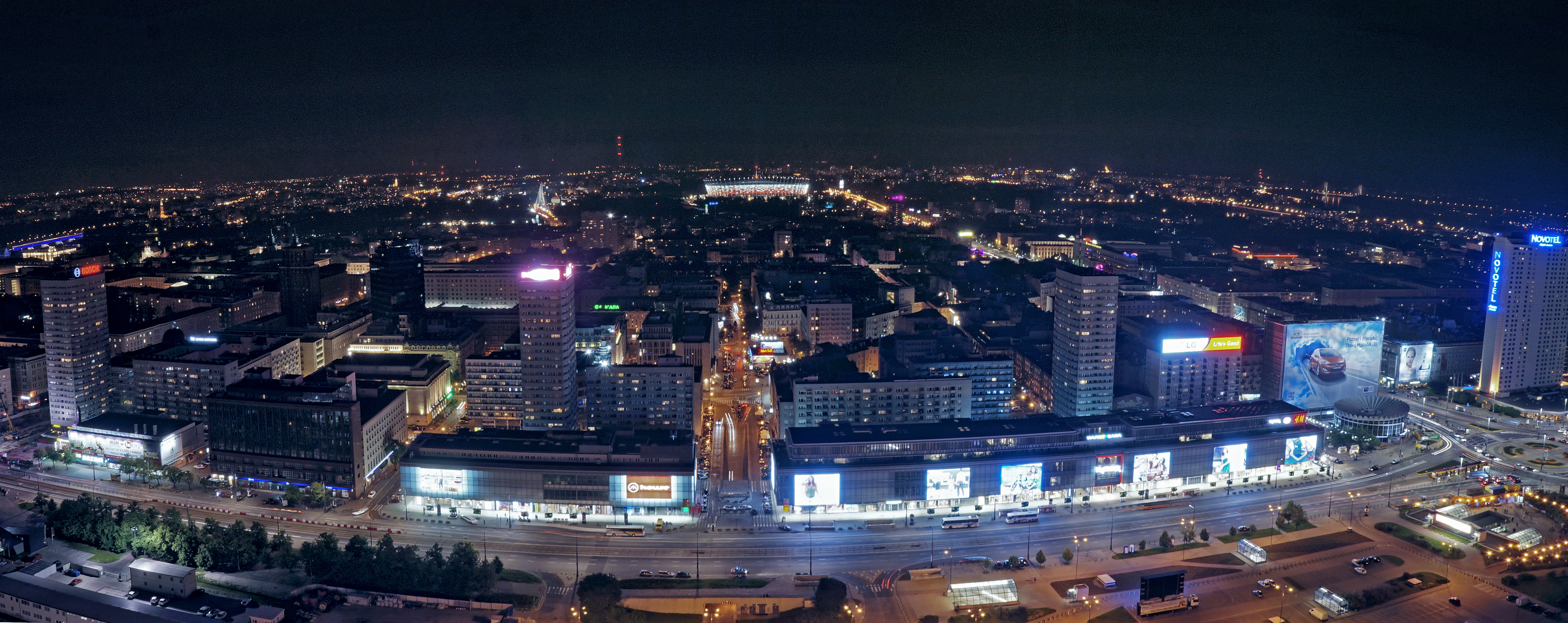
- Interactive map of Marszałkowska Street
- Length: 3.6 km (2.2 mi)
- Location: Warsaw, Poland
- South end: Union of Lublin Square
- North end: Bank Square

Construction
- Inauguration: 1757

Marszałkowska Street (Polish: ulica Marszałkowska), also known by its English name Marshal Street, is one of the main thoroughfares of Warsaw, Poland, located in the district of Śródmieście. It runs along the north–south axis, from Bank Square in the north to the Union of Lublin Square in the south.

== History ==
Contrary to a common urban legend that attributes the name to Marshal of Poland Józef Piłsudski, the street's name actually relates to 18th-century Grand Marshal of the Crown Franciszek Bieliński.

Marszałkowska Street was established by Franciszek Bieliński and opened in 1757. It was much shorter then, running only from Królewska Street to Widok Street.

The street was almost entirely destroyed during the Warsaw Uprising of 1944. Rebuilding of Warsaw after World War II coincided with emergence of socialist realism, which greatly influenced the surrounding urban architecture.

== Gallery ==
=== Historical images ===
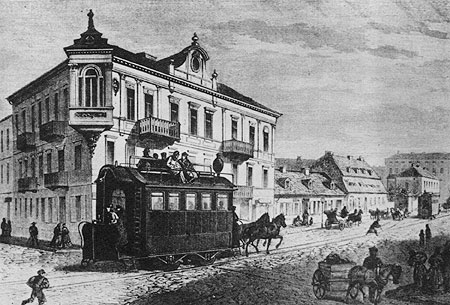
Marszałkowska Street in 1867

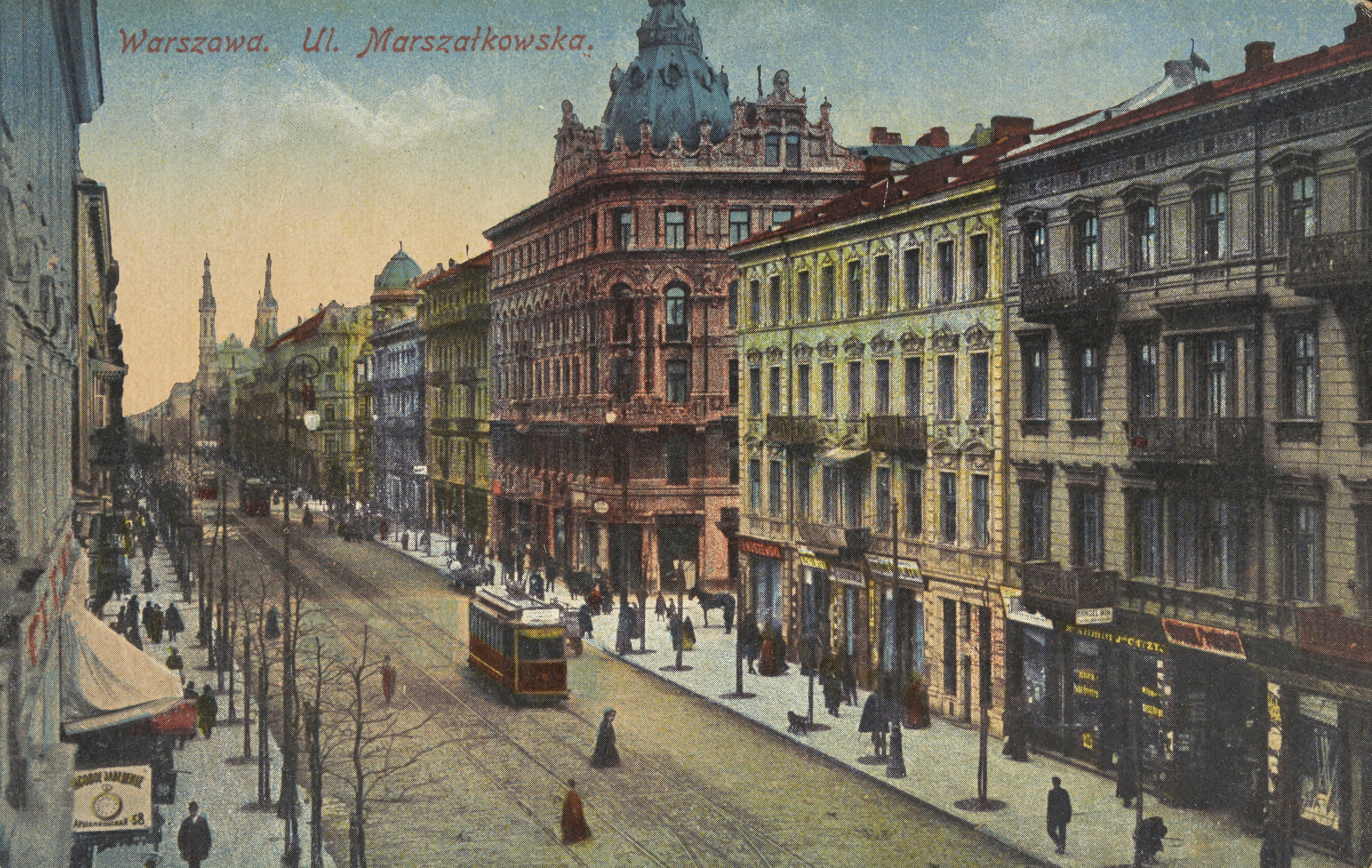
General view in about 1912

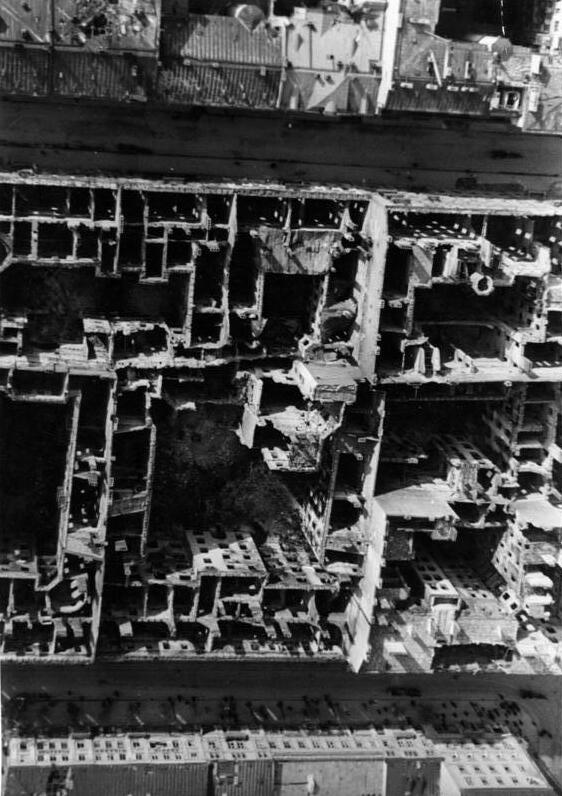
Warsaw during World War II: destroyed townhouses between Zielna (top) and Marszałkowska streets (bottom). In bottom right corner building Marszałkowska 156 on the corner with Królewskia street, also visible Bloch Palace at Marszałkowska 154. September 1939

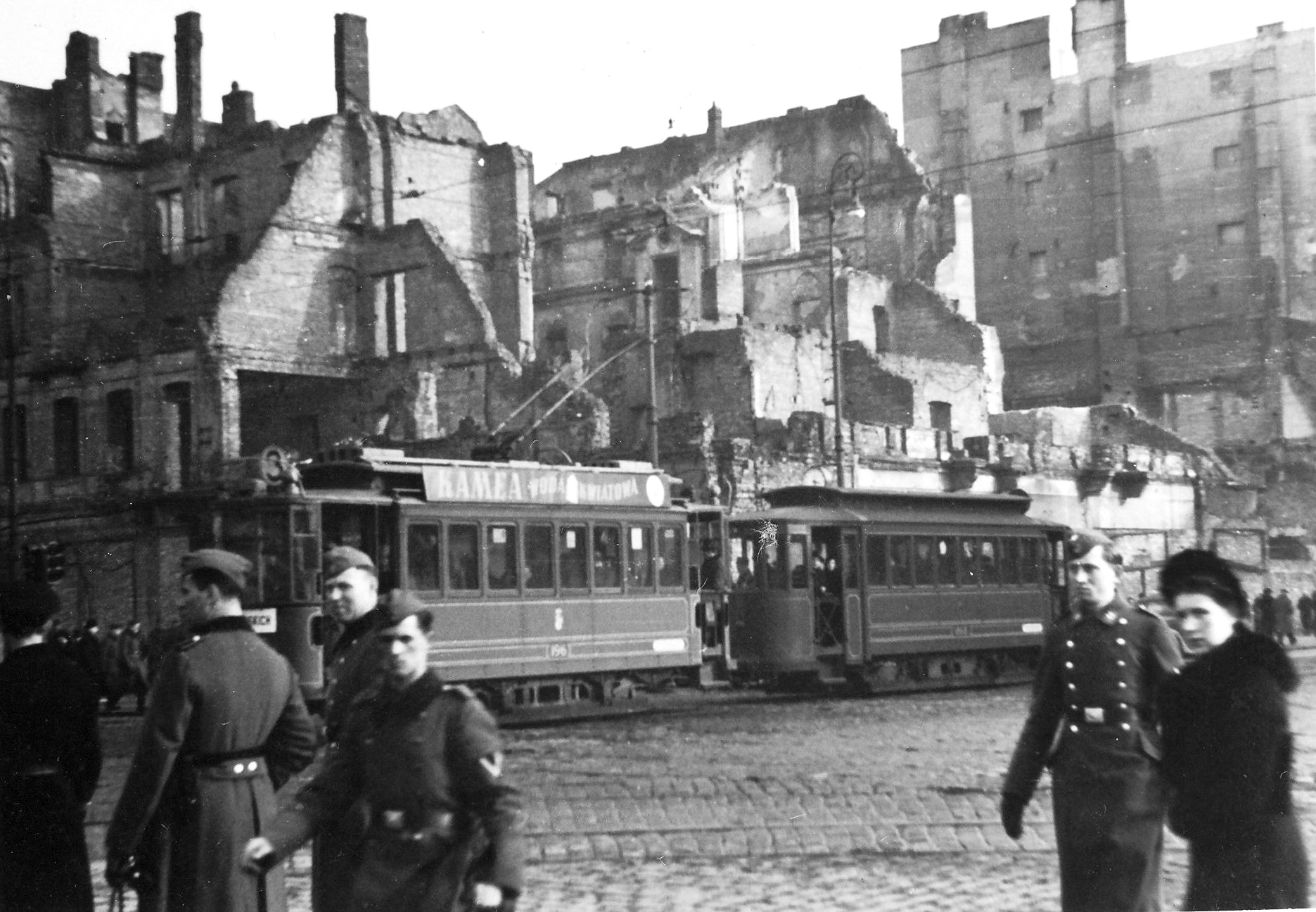
Intersection of Marszałkowska Street and Aleje Jerozolimskie (Jerusalem Avenue) in Warsaw during German occupation. Visible tramway #3 with a billboard "Kamea woda kwiatowa". Behind it ruins of a destroyed townhouse from 1939 at Marszałkowska 98/al. Jerozolimskie 33 streets.

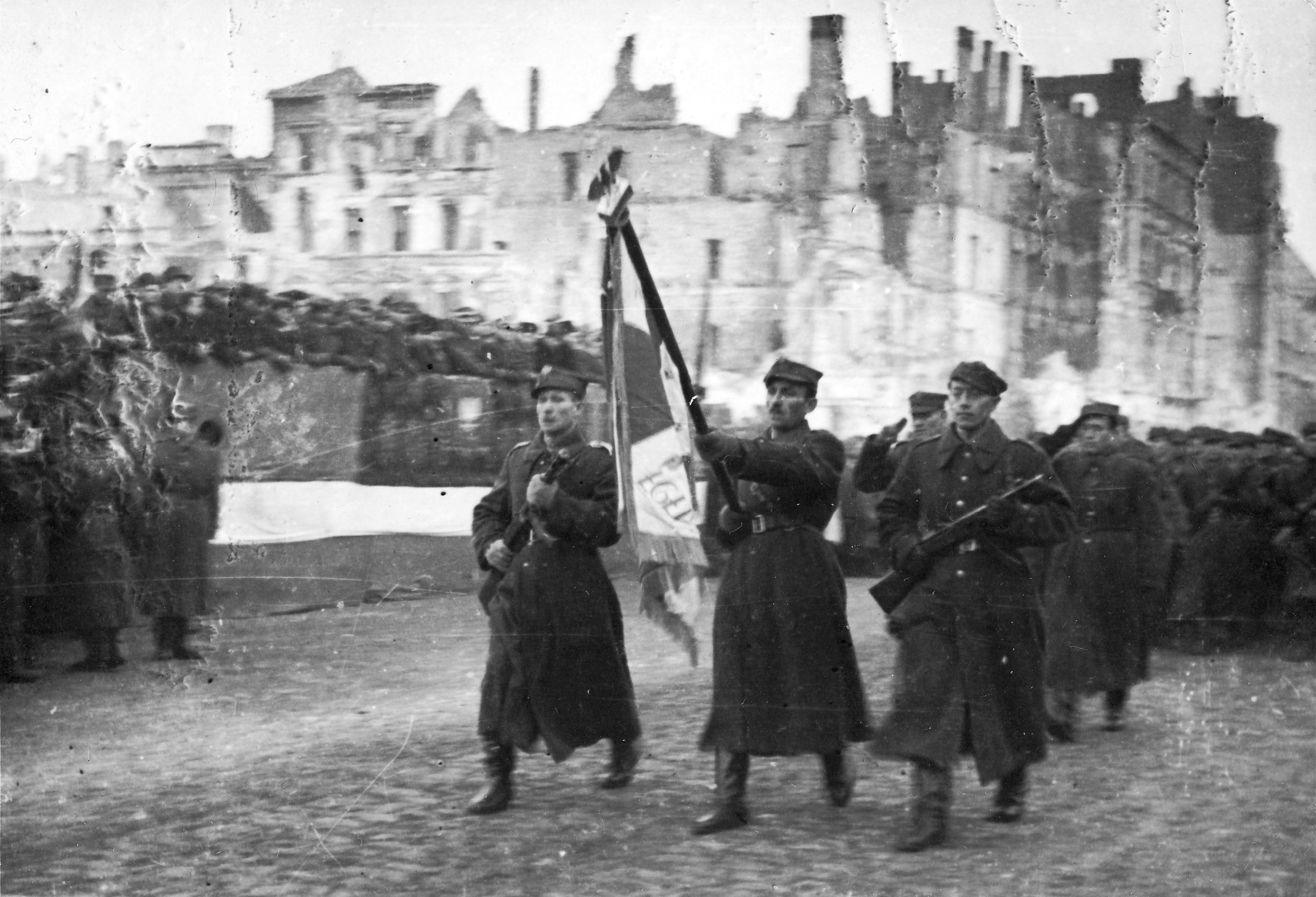
Shortly after the war, January 19, 1945. 1st Polish Army of the East Marszałkowska Street Warsaw

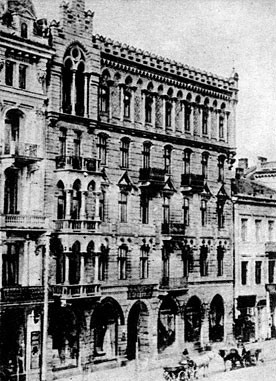
Zamboni Brothers Tenement built in 1894

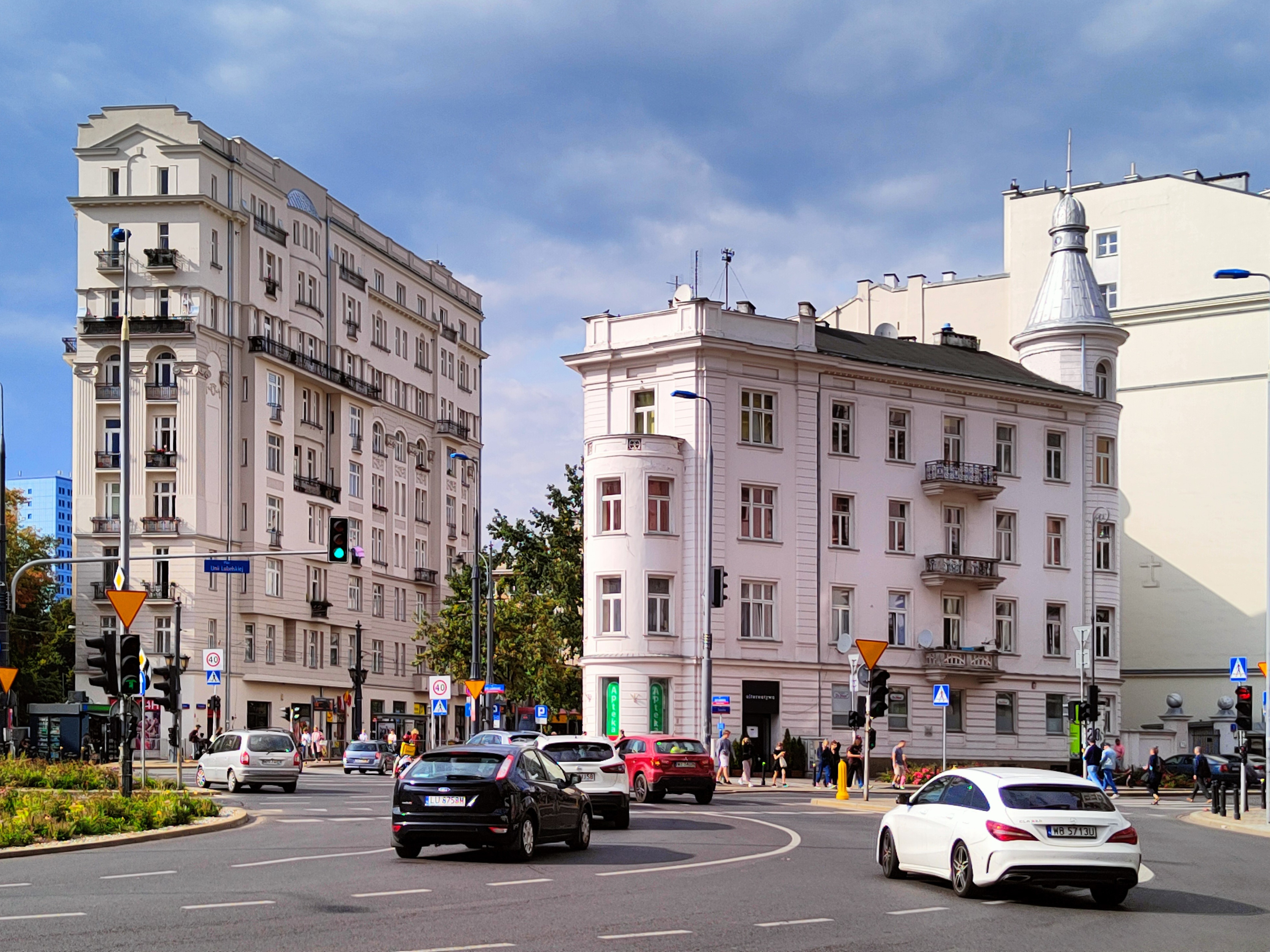
Juda Wielburski Tenement (aka Potempski Tenement) at the intersection of 2 Marszałkowska and 1 Szucha. Survived the War.

=== Features (before the war) ===
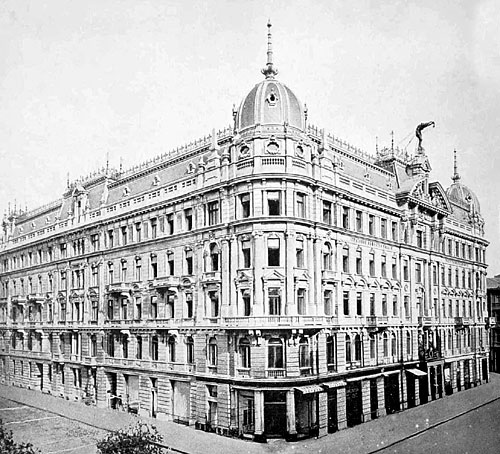
Insurance Company "Rosja" in 1901

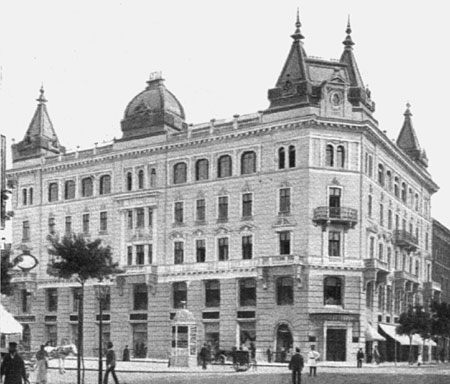
Herse Tenement in 1904

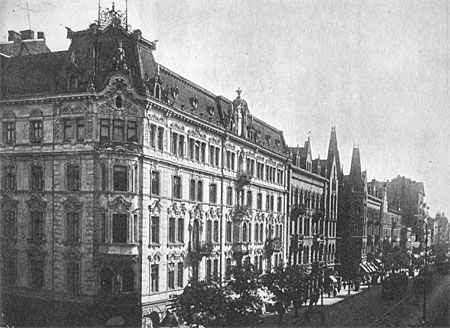
Rothberg Tenement in 1914

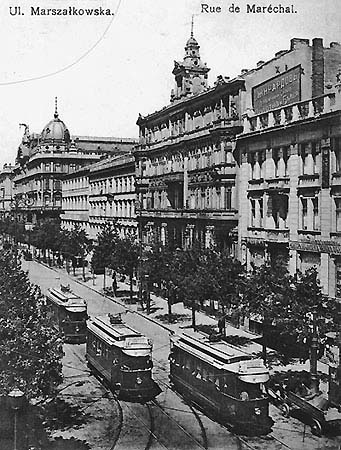
Marszałkowska in 1914

== See also ==
- Henryk Poddębski
