= Crossroads Square =

Urban square in Warsaw, Poland

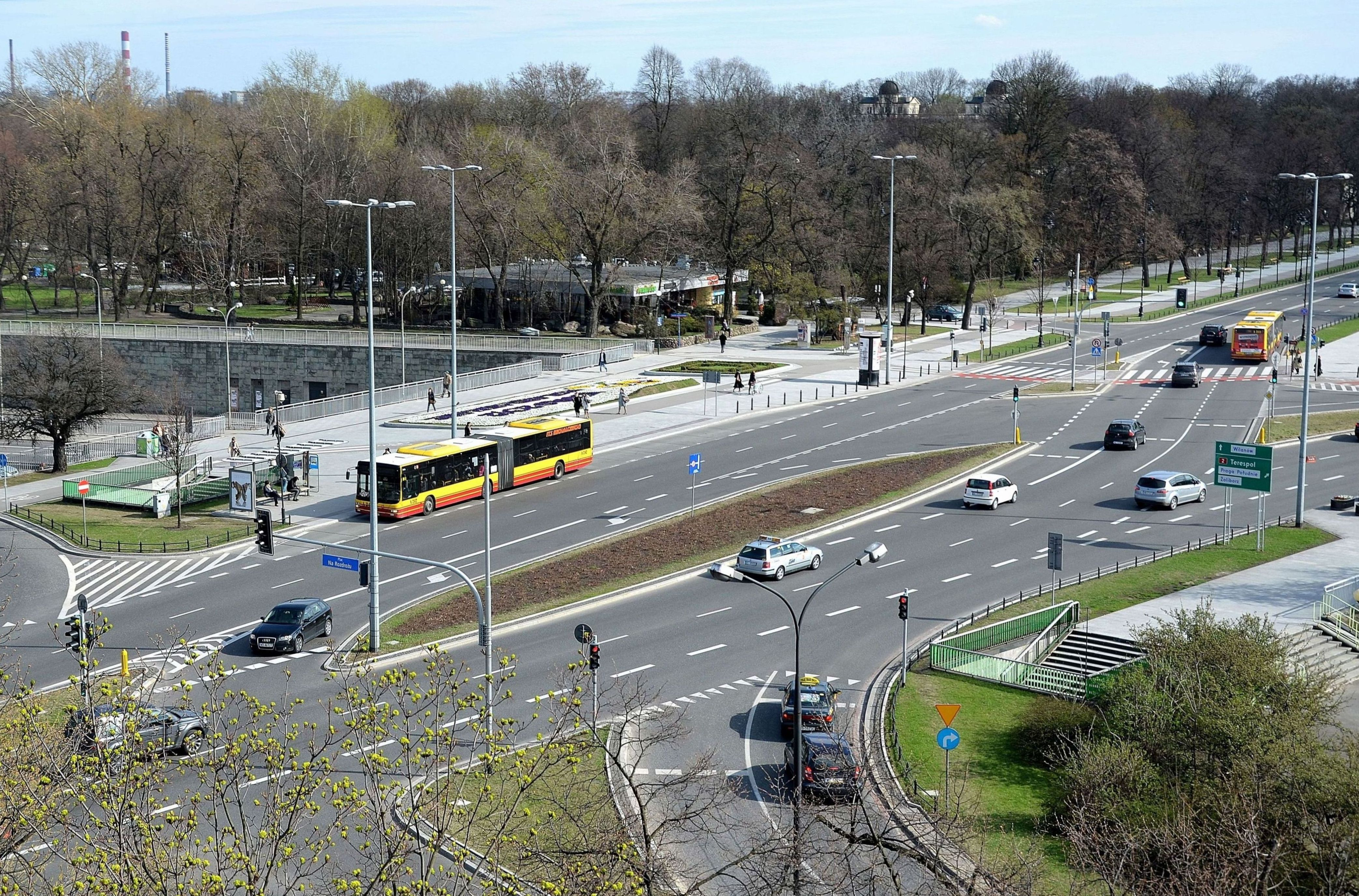
- Crossroads Square in 2012

- Location within Warsaw
- Former name: Freedom Square
- Location: Warsaw, Poland
- Coordinates: 52°13′10.2″N 21°01′29.5″E
- North: Ujazdów Avenue
- East: People's Army Avenue
- South: Szuch Avenue; Ujazdów Avenue
- West: Koszykowa Street; People's Army Avenue; Emancipation Avenue

Construction
- Completion: 1768

Other
- Designer: August Fryderyk Moszyński

The Crossroads Square (Polish: Plac Na Rozdrożu) is an urban square and a road interchange in Warsaw, Poland. It is located in the district of Downtown, at the crossing of Emancipation Avenue, Koszykowa Street, Szuch Avenue, People's Army Avenue, and Ujazdów Avenue. It was built in 1768.

== History ==
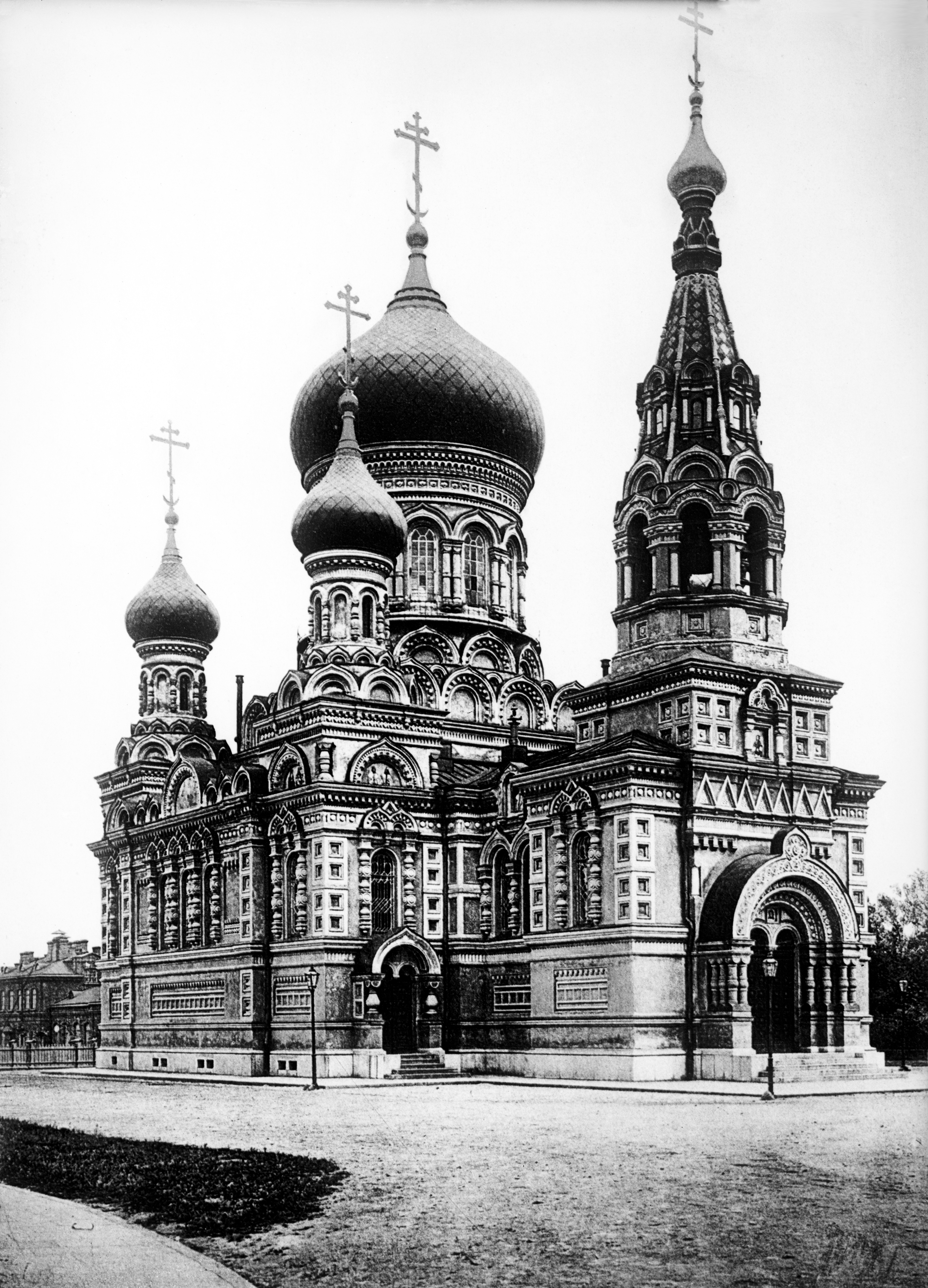
The St. Michael the Archangel Church, sometime between 1909 and 1919

Crossroads Square was built in 1768, as part of the Stanisław Axis, which included the creation of several urban squares connected with roads, with the main road centred on Ujazdów Castle. It was designed by August Fryderyk Moszyński. Crossroads Square was placed at the crossing of the Royal Route and the Wolska Road (now Emancipation Avenue and Nowowiejska Street respectively). From it four avenues branched off, of which three survive to the modern day. They are: Koszykowa Street, Szuch Avenue, and Emancipation Avenue.

In 1894, next to the square, at 12 Ujazdów Avenue, the Russian Orthodox St. Michael the Archangel Church was opened, which mainly served Russian soldiers and civilians living in the area. Following the retreat of Russian forces from Warsaw in 1915, the building remained mostly unoccupied and unused, deteriorating, and was eventually torn down in 1923.

In the late 1930s, it was planned to place a large monument dedicated to Józef Piłsudski, former Chief of State of Poland. It was part of the proposed Józef Piłsudski District, which was designed at nearby Mokotów Field. Neither plans were realised. During the interwar period, the square was known as Freedom Square (Polish: Plac Wolności).

From 1939 to 1944, during the German occupation in the Second World War, the tenement building next to the park, at 11 Ujazdów Avenue, was the headquarters of the Criminal Police. After the war, from 1945 to 1954, it was the headquarters of the Ministry of Public Security.

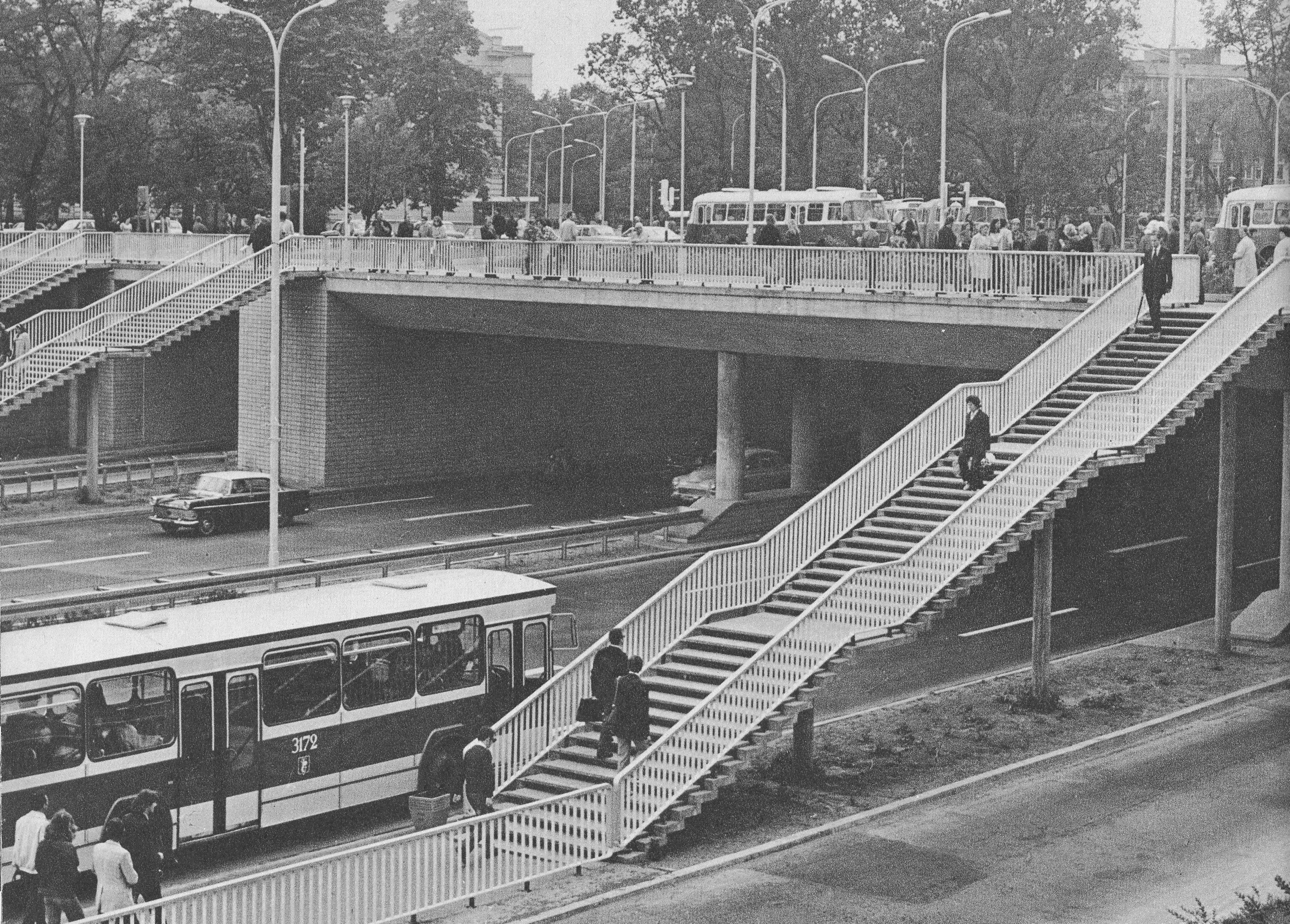
The People's Army Avenue and Crossroads Square in 1974

Between 1971 and 1974, the People's Army Avenue, which was part of the Baths Route, an expressway connecting the city centre with the east side, was built. It crossed the square, which was severely altered in the process, including building a 46-metre-long tunnel underneath. Among other changes, in the western portion, a small square with a fountain was added. The Baths Way was placed diagonally in relation to the park, distorting the shape of the historical Stanisław Axis.

In 1990, it was again proposed to place a monument dedicated to Józef Piłsudski at the square. On 11 November 1990, the National Independence Day of Poland, there was installed a plaque informing about of such decision, remaining until 1994. It was eventually decided to place the monument at the Piłsudski Square instead, where it was unveiled in 1995.

On 10 November 2006, at the crossing of Szuch Avenue and Ujazdów Avenue, was unveiled a statue of Roman Dmowski, the Ministry of Foreign Affairs of Poland from 1923, as well as activist for Polish independence, and the founder of the National Democracy. The monument became an object of controversies and protests due to Dmowski's racists and antisemitic views and policies. It was designed by Wojciech Mendzelewski, Maria Marek-Prus, and Piotr Prus.

In May 2018, at the square, was established an urban vegetable garden.

On 11 November 2018, at the square, near the Ujazdów Avenue, was unveiled the statue to Ignacy Mościcki, a politician and chairperson of the Polish Socialist Party, and the Prime Minister of the Provisional People's Government of the Republic of Poland in 1918. It was designed by Jacek Kucaba.

On 4 June 2023, the square was the starting point of the march of the anti-government protest against actions of the ruling Law and Justice Party. The protest was organized and led by Donald Tusk, Rafał Trzaskowski, and Lech Wałęsa, and was attended by over 500,000 people.

Currently, it is planned to place a monument dedicated to the 1920 Battle of Warsaw at the square. It was originally announced in 2019, and planned to be unveiled in 2020, before being rescheduled to 2021, and then to 2023, and again, to a currently indeterminate date in the future. At the same time, it is also planned to modify the square itself, including remodeling the bus stops at Baths Route, as well as the stairs connecting them with the rest of the square, and the addition of lifts. A crossing will also be created on Wyzwolenia Avenue, replacing the underground crossings that will be deconstructed.

== Characteristics ==
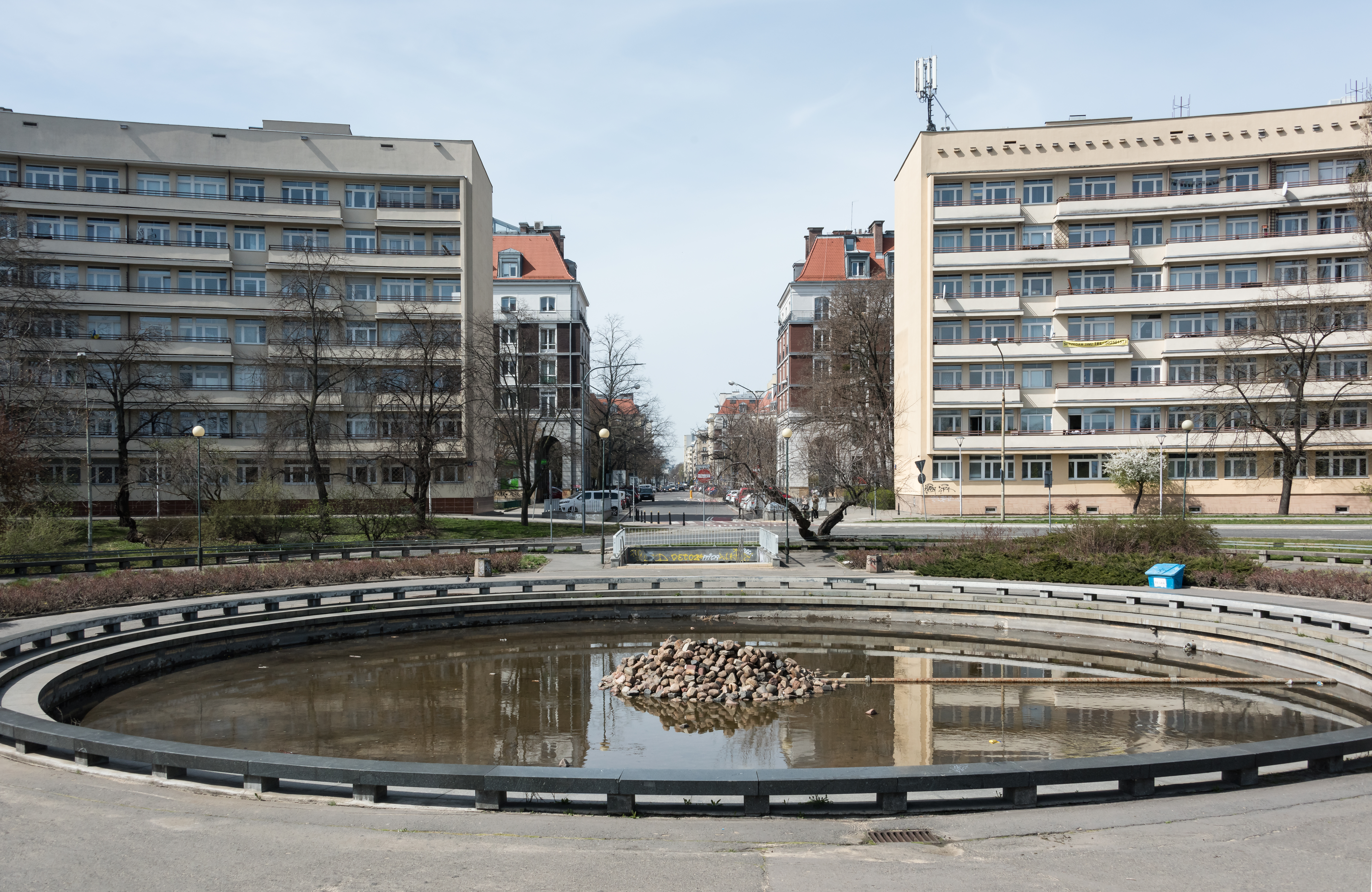
The fountain at Crossroads Square in 2022

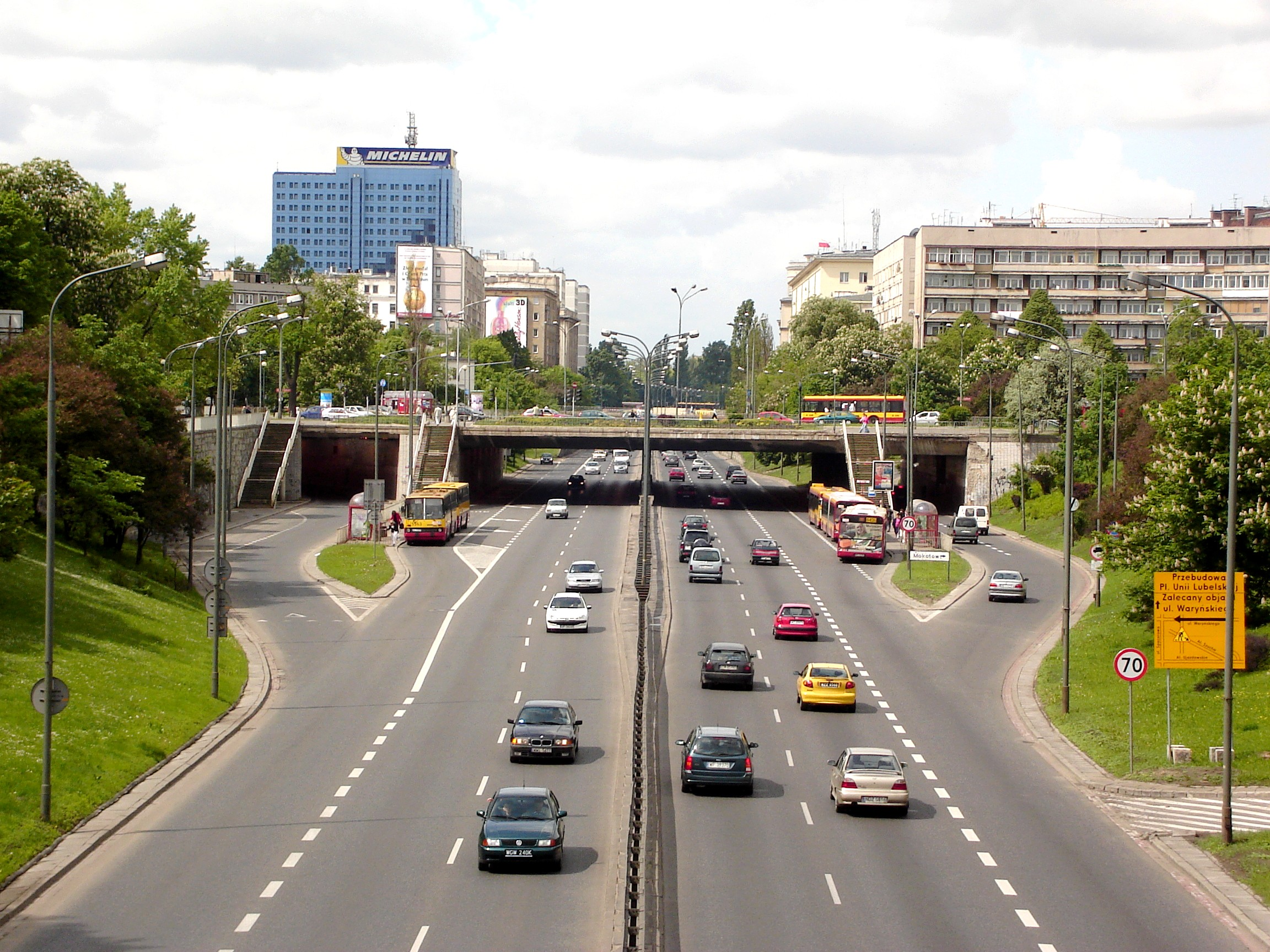
A view on Crossroads Square, and the tunnels underneath, as seen from the People's Army Avenue in 2006

Crossroads Square is located at the crossing of Emancipation Avenue, Koszykowa Street, Szuch Avenue, People's Army Avenue, and Ujazdów Avenue. It has the total area of 1.96 ha.

The square is divided into two parts on two different levels. The top portion includes the main portion of the square, connected to the surroundings. In its western portion, there is a small circular square with a fountain in it. Below is the People's Army Avenue, which is a part of the Baths Route, an expressway connecting the city centre with the east side. Its portion goes through the 46-metre-long tunnel under the square. On its side are the bus stops, which are connected to the square via staircases.

The square includes the Ignacy Daszyński Monument by Jacek Kucaba, and Roman Dmowski Monument by Wojciech Mendzelewski, Maria Marek-Prus, and Piotr Prus. It borders the Ujazdów Park, the Botanical Garden of the University of Warsaw, and Stefan Kisielewski "Kisiel" Square.

== Gallery ==
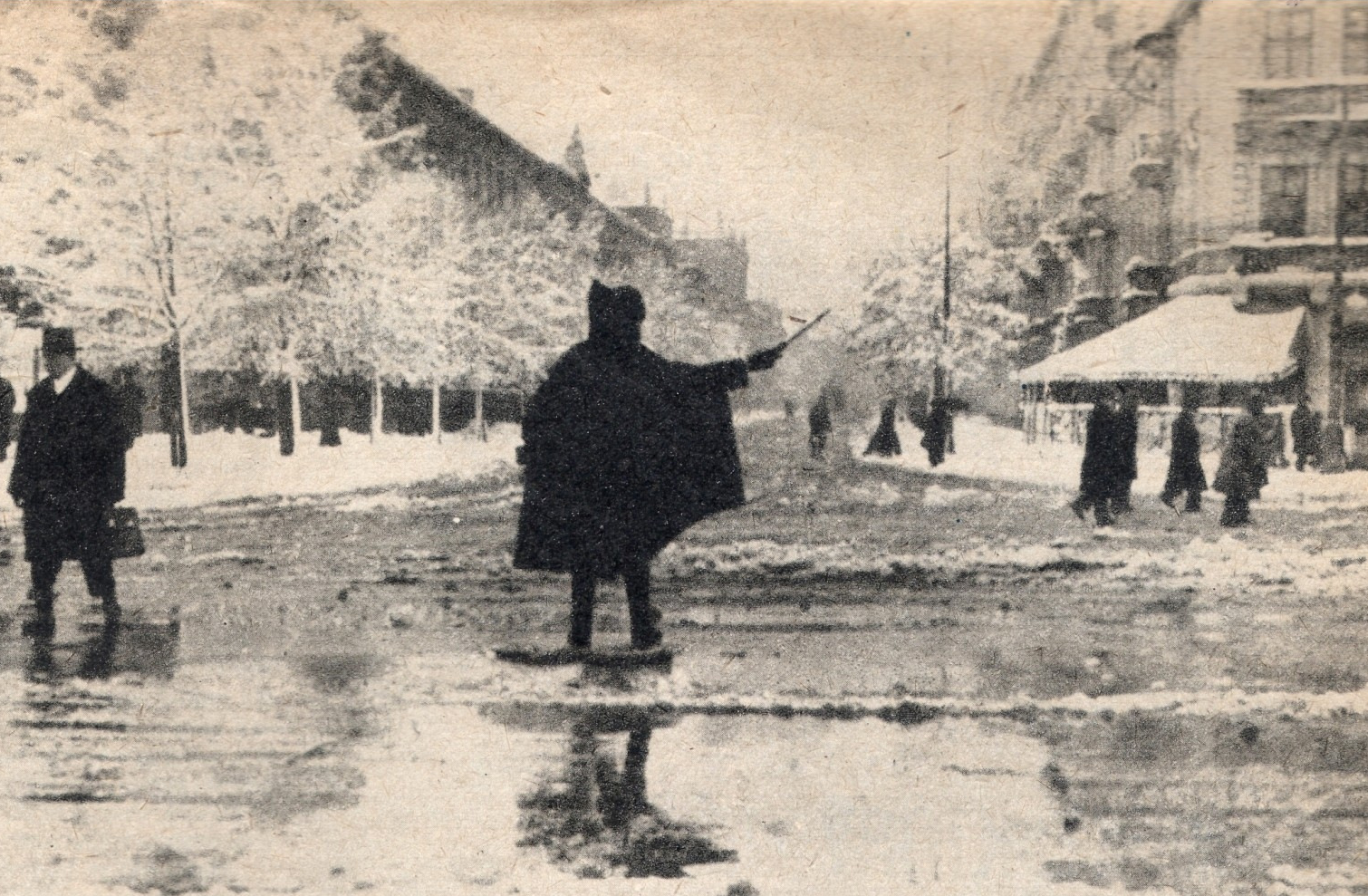
Crossroads Square in 1935

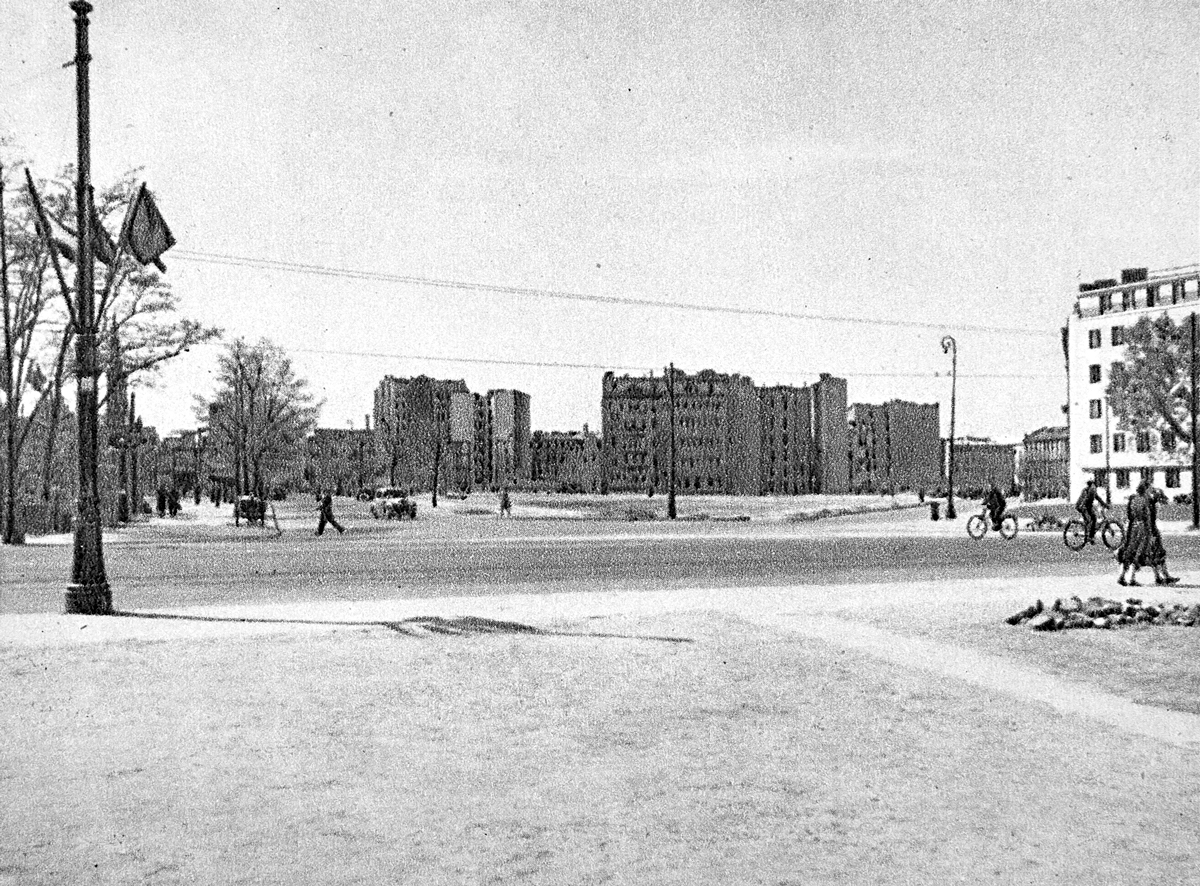
Crossroads Square in 1949

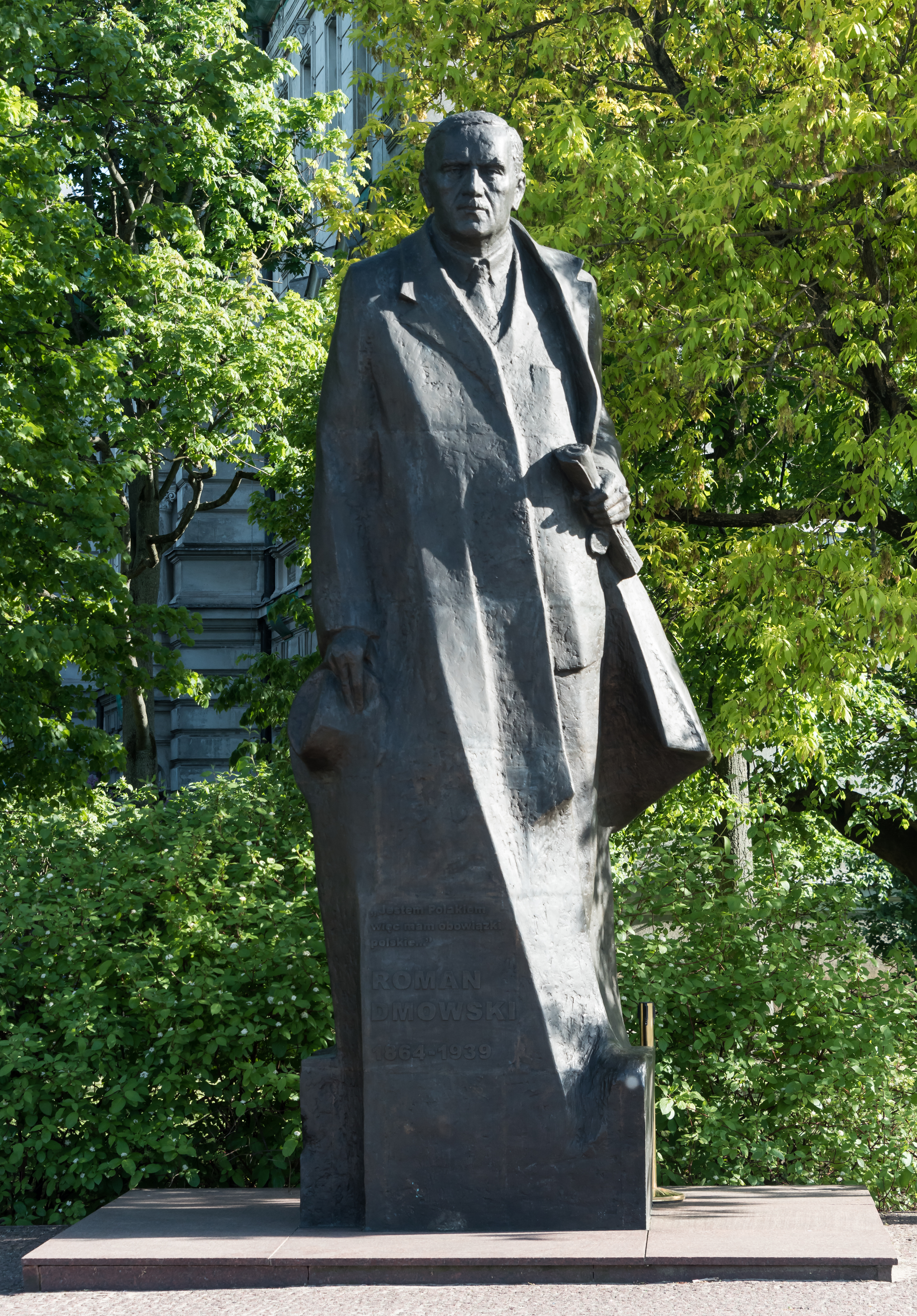
Roman Dmowski Monument at Crossroads Square

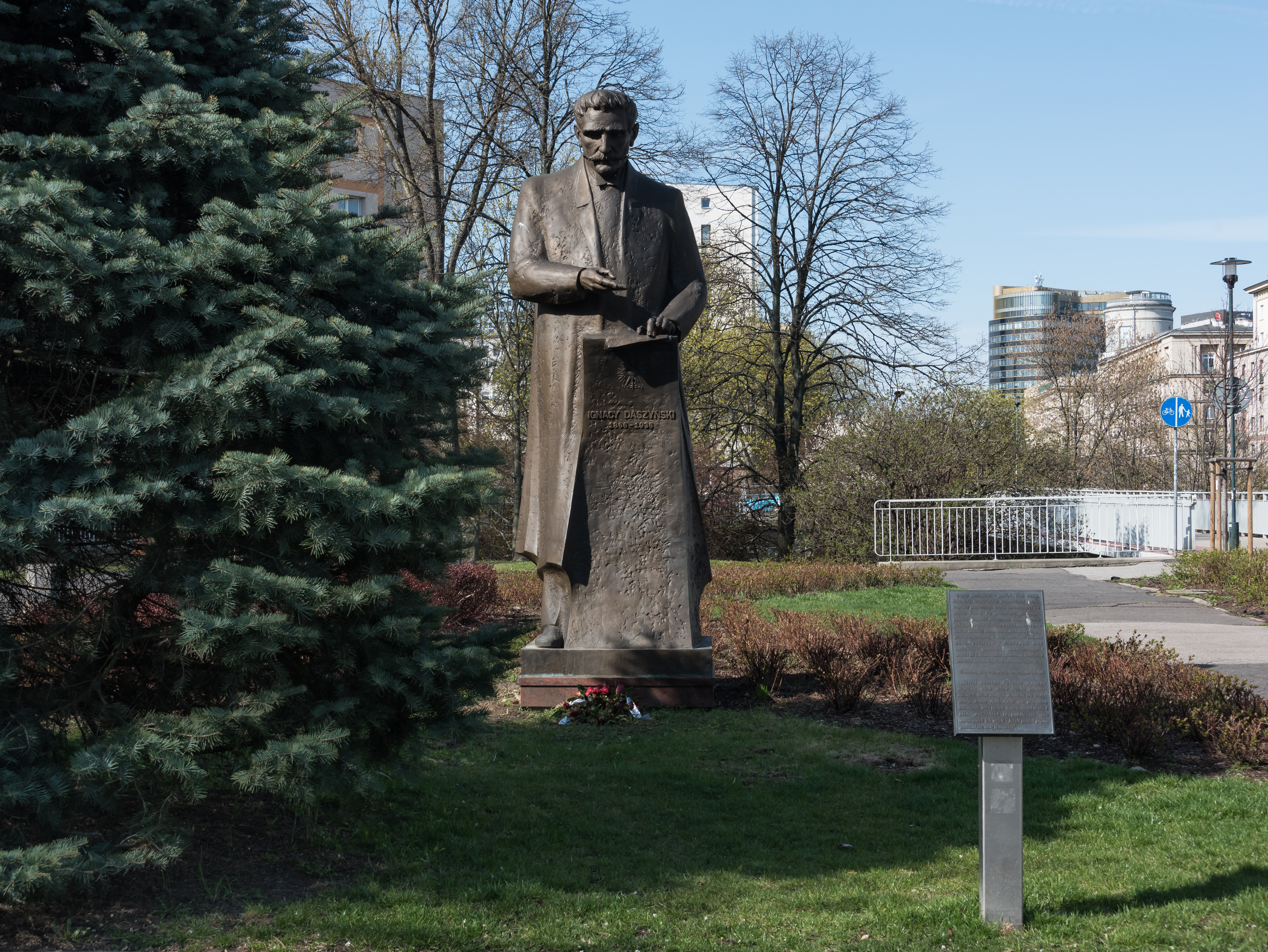
Ignacy Daszyński Monument at Crossroads Square

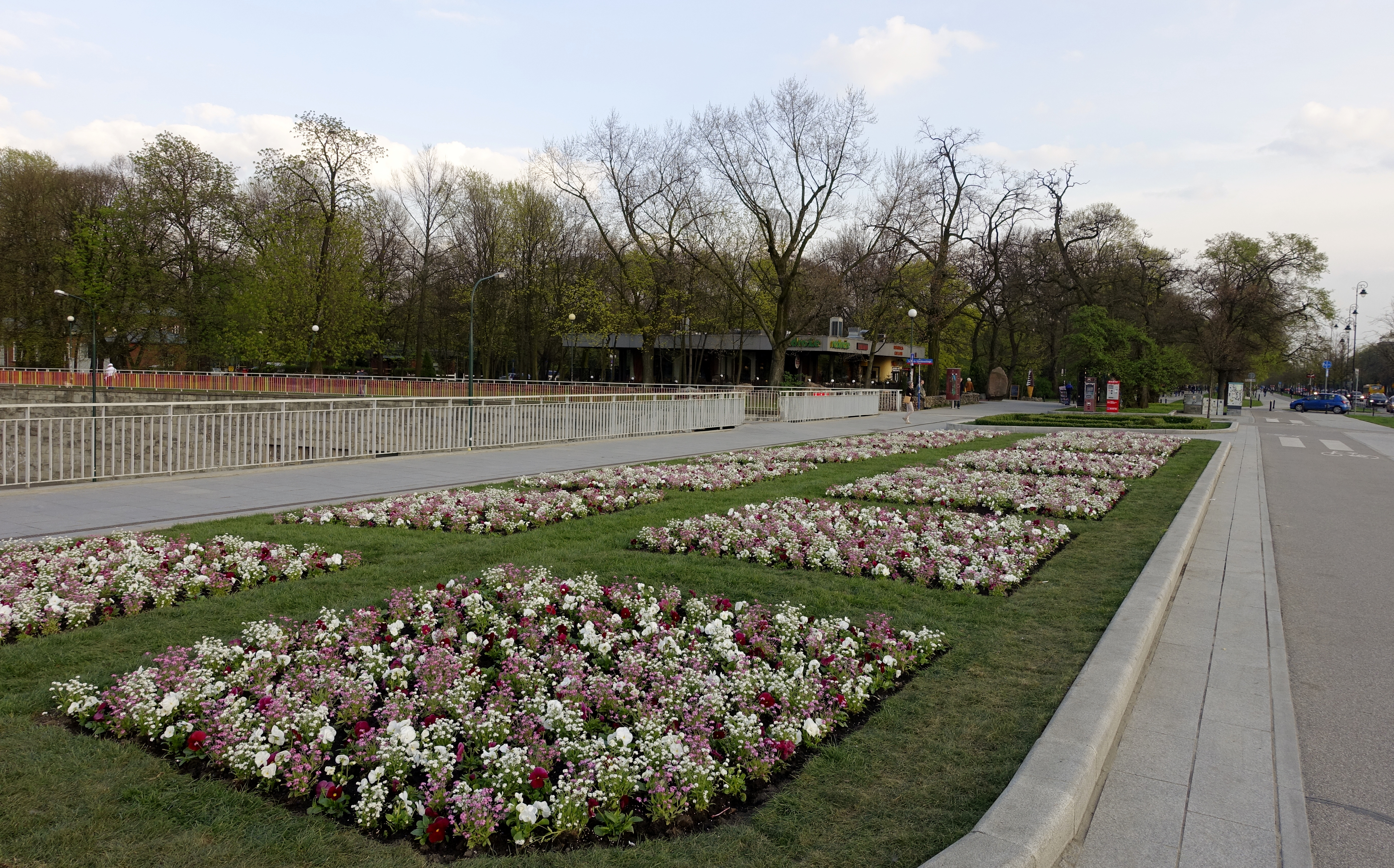
Flowerbeds at Crossroads Square

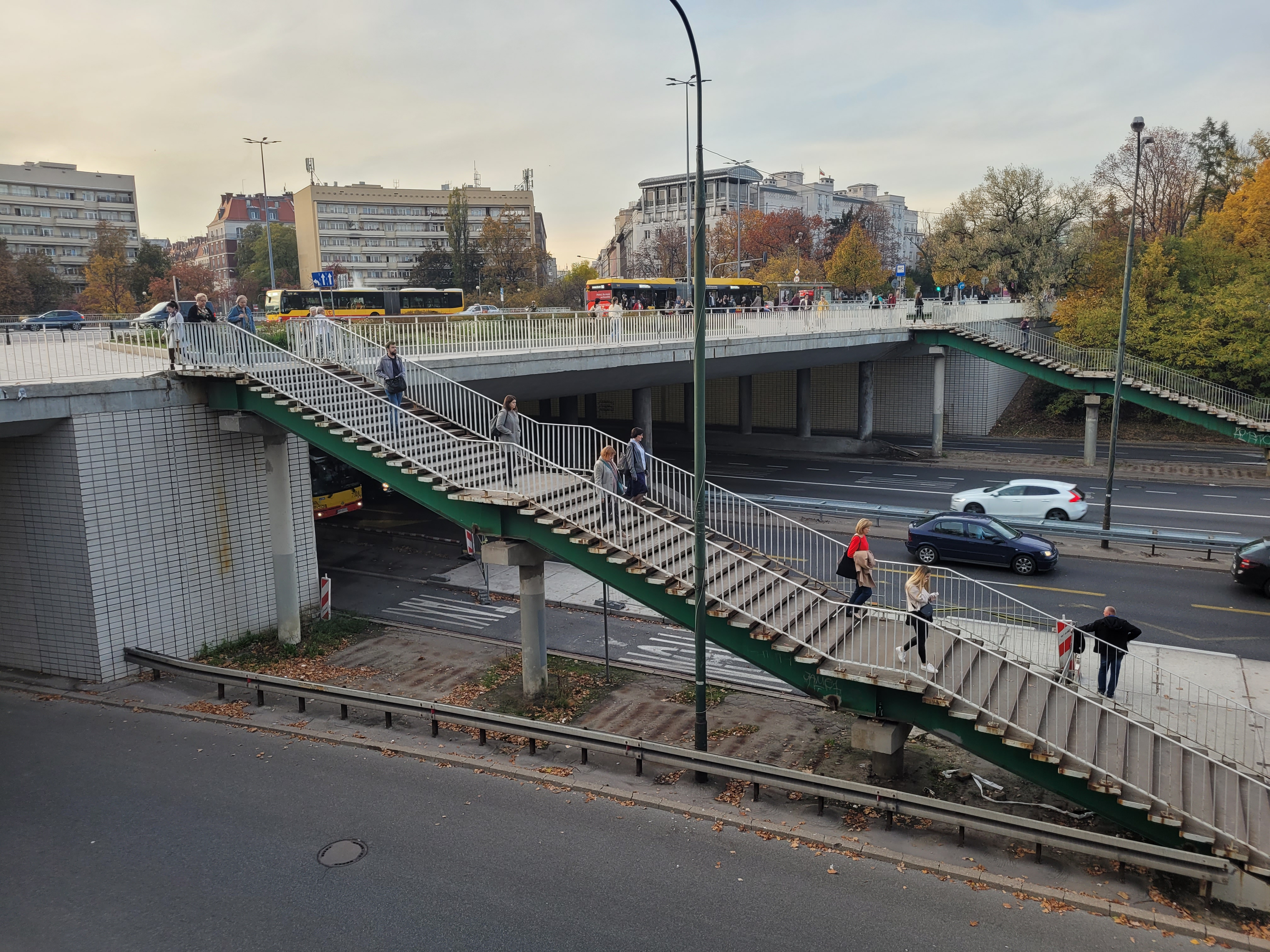
The stairscases connecting Crossroads Square with the bus stops at People's Army Avenue

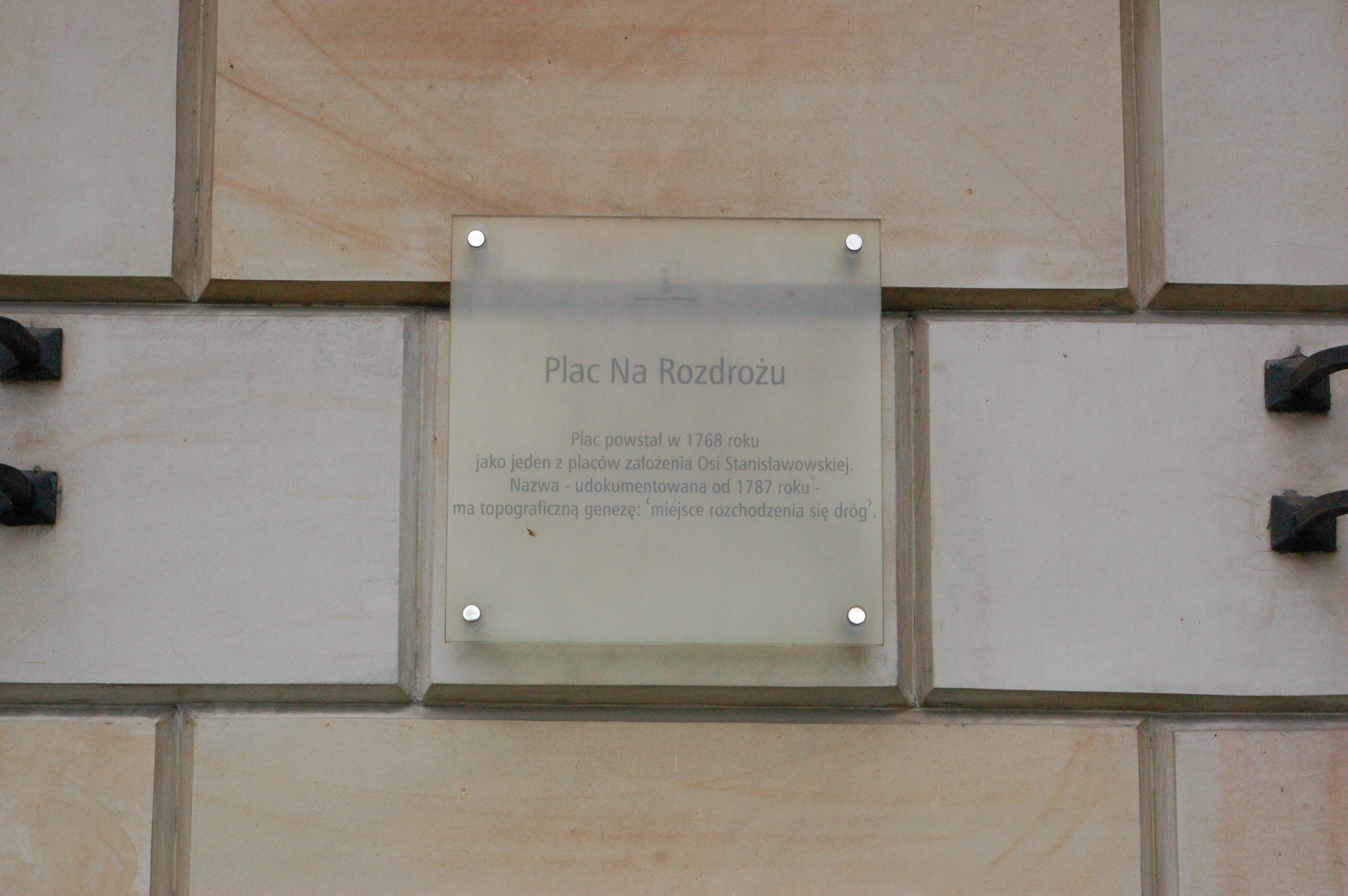
Commemorative plaque at the square
