= Fryderyk Józef Moszyński =

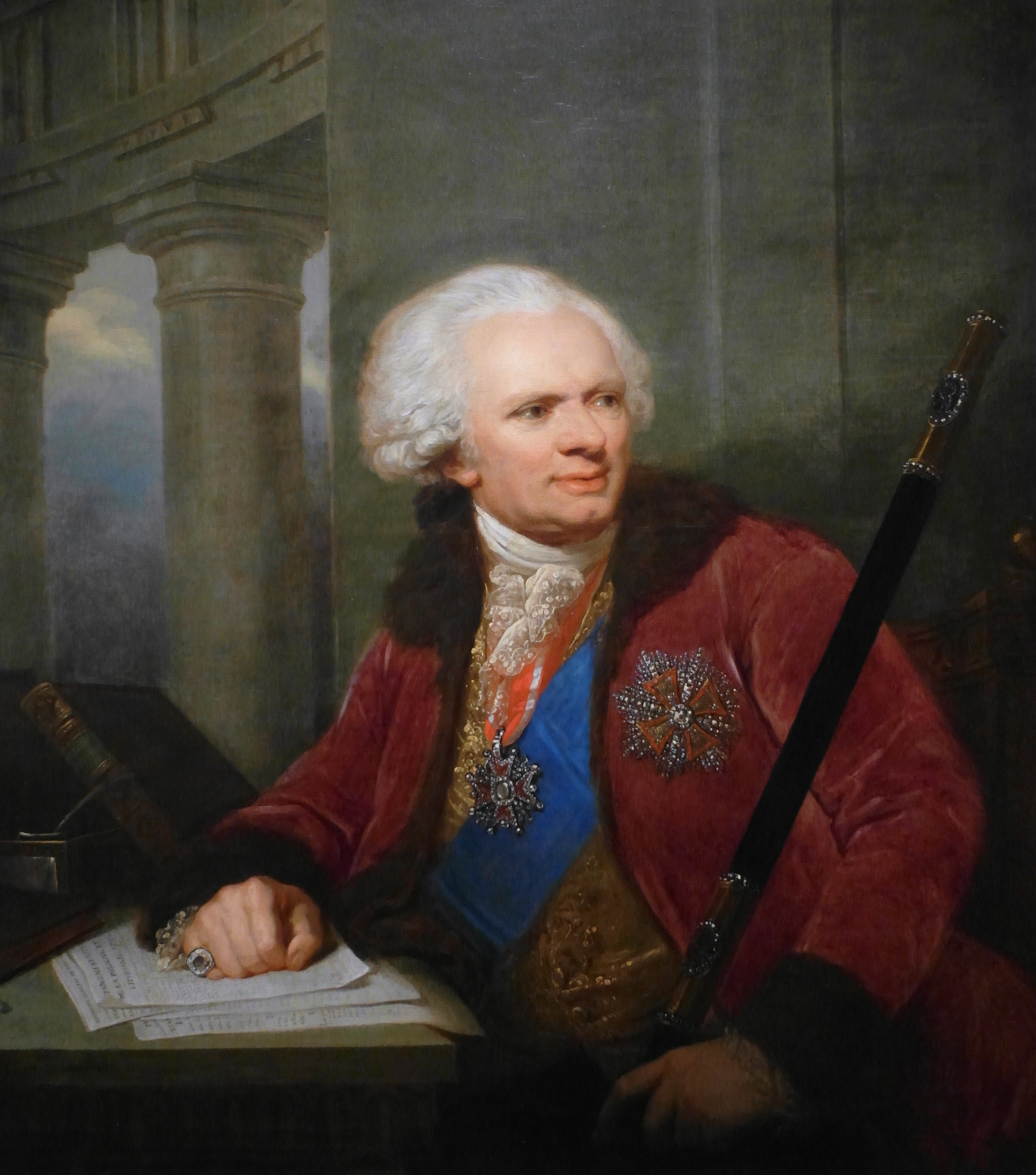
- Coat of arms: Nałęcz
- Full name: Fryderyk Józef Jan Kanty Moszyński
- Born: Dresden
- Baptised: 14 March 1738; Dresden
- Died: 22 January 1817; Kiev
- Buried: Dolsk
- Spouses: Barbara Rudzieńska, Salomea Rzyszczewska
- Father: Jan Kanty Moszyński
- Mother: Fryderyka Augusta

Fryderyk Józef Jan Kanty Moszyński (1738 in Dresden – 21 January 1817 in Kiev) of Nałęcz coat of arms was a noble (szlachcic) in the Polish–Lithuanian Commonwealth. He held the offices of Lithuanian Referendary, Lithuanian Grand Secretary and Crown Grand Marshal.

Fryderyk Józef Moszyński was a son of Jan Kanty Moszyński, Grand Treasurer of the Crown (podskarbi wielki koronny), and Fryderyka Augusta, an illegitimate daughter of Augustus II the Strong, king of Poland, and his mistress Countess of Cosel. He was posthumus (his father died on 15 September 1737). He had an older brother, August Fryderyk Moszyński.

Fryderyk Józef Moszyński was born in Dresden. He was baptised on 14 March 1738. Fryderyk Józef Moszyński spent his childhood in Dresden under the tutelage of Heinrich von Brühl. He was well educated. Moszyński knew a few languages. He was also interested in maths. In 1766–68 he was the member of Crown Treasury Commission, and from 1768 a vice-commander of the Cadet Corps, a function he performed well, even donating some of his funds to the Szkoła Rycerska. However, in 1792 he joined the Targowica Confederation, whose actions resulted in the fall of the Constitution of 3 May and the Second Partition of Poland. In 1793 he was a member of commission investigating a banking crisis in the Commonwealth, and the member of the Permanent Council in charge of police. In the aftermath of the Warsaw Uprising during the Kościuszko Uprising, he was imprisoned by the Polish revolutionaries. On 28 June 1794 an angry mob stormed the prison with the intention of hanging many of the people considered traitors; Moszyński was saved by the intervention of Ignacy Wyssogota Zakrzewski, although many others – like bishop Ignacy Jakub Massalski or prince Antoni Stanisław Czetwertyński-Światopełk – were hanged that day.
