= Statue of Ignacy Daszyński =

Monument in Warsaw, Poland

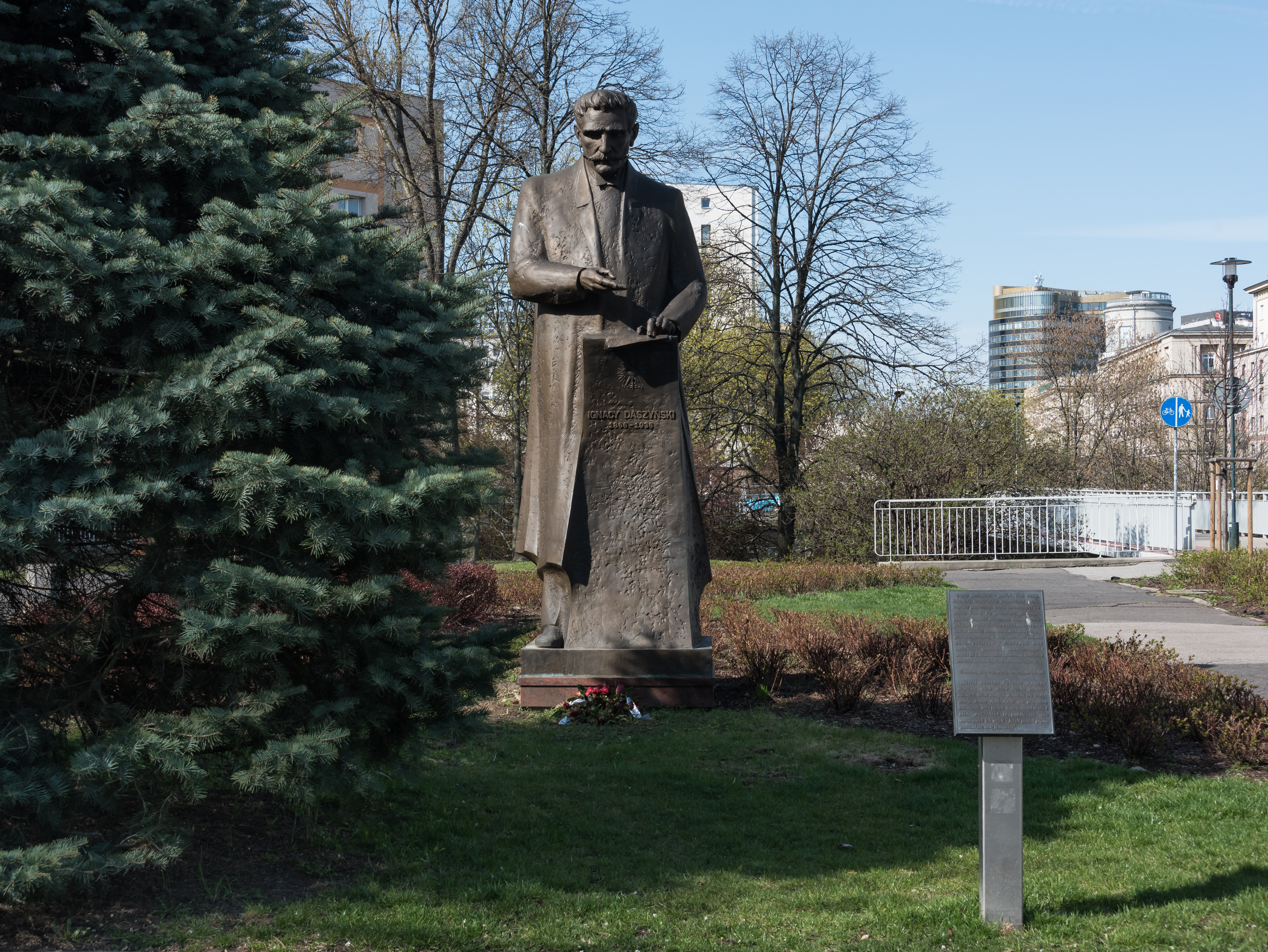
- The monument in 2022
- Interactive map of Statue of Ignacy Daszyński
- Location: Crossroads Square, Downtown, Warsaw, Poland
- Coordinates: 52°13′07.0″N 21°01′25.5″E
- Designer: Jacek Kucaba
- Type: Statue
- Material: Bronze
- Height: 4.5 m (15 ft)
- Opening date: 11 November 2018
- Dedicated to: Ignacy Daszyński

The statue of Ignacy Daszyński (Polish: Pomnik Ignacego Daszyńskiego) is a bronze statue in Warsaw, Poland, placed in the Crossroads Square, at the intersection of Szucha Avenue and People's Army Avenue. It is dedicated to Ignacy Daszyński, a socialist and politician who was the first prime minister of Poland in 1918. The monument was designed by Jacek Kucaba and unveiled on 11 November 2018.

== History ==
In 2012, Bronisław Komorowski, the president of Poland, gave his support to the long-proposed idea of erecting monument dedicated to Ignacy Daszyński (1866–1936), a socialist and politician who was the first prime minister of Poland in 1918. The monument was designed by sculptor Jacek Kucaba.

It was unveiled on 11 November 2018, in the 100th National Independence Day of Poland. The ceremony was attended, among others, by the deputy prime minister and minister of culture and national heritage Piotr Gliński, the Deputy Marshal of the Senate Bogdan Borusewicz, former President of Poland Aleksander Kwaśniewski, and the chairperson of the All-Poland Alliance of Trade Unions, Jan Guz. There were also representatives of the Democratic Left Alliance, Polish People's Party, Labour Union, Greens, Left Together, and Ignacy Daszyński Centre. During the ceremony, a letter from President of Poland Andrzej Duda was read.

== Characteristics ==
The monument is located in the Crossroads Square, at the intersection of Szucha Avenue and People's Army Avenue. It consists of a bronze statue of Ignacy Daszyński standing behind a small lectern. It has a height of 4.5 m.
