= Józef Piłsudski Monument (Piłsudski Square) =

Statue in Warsaw

- Pomnik Józefa Piłsudskiego w Warszawie
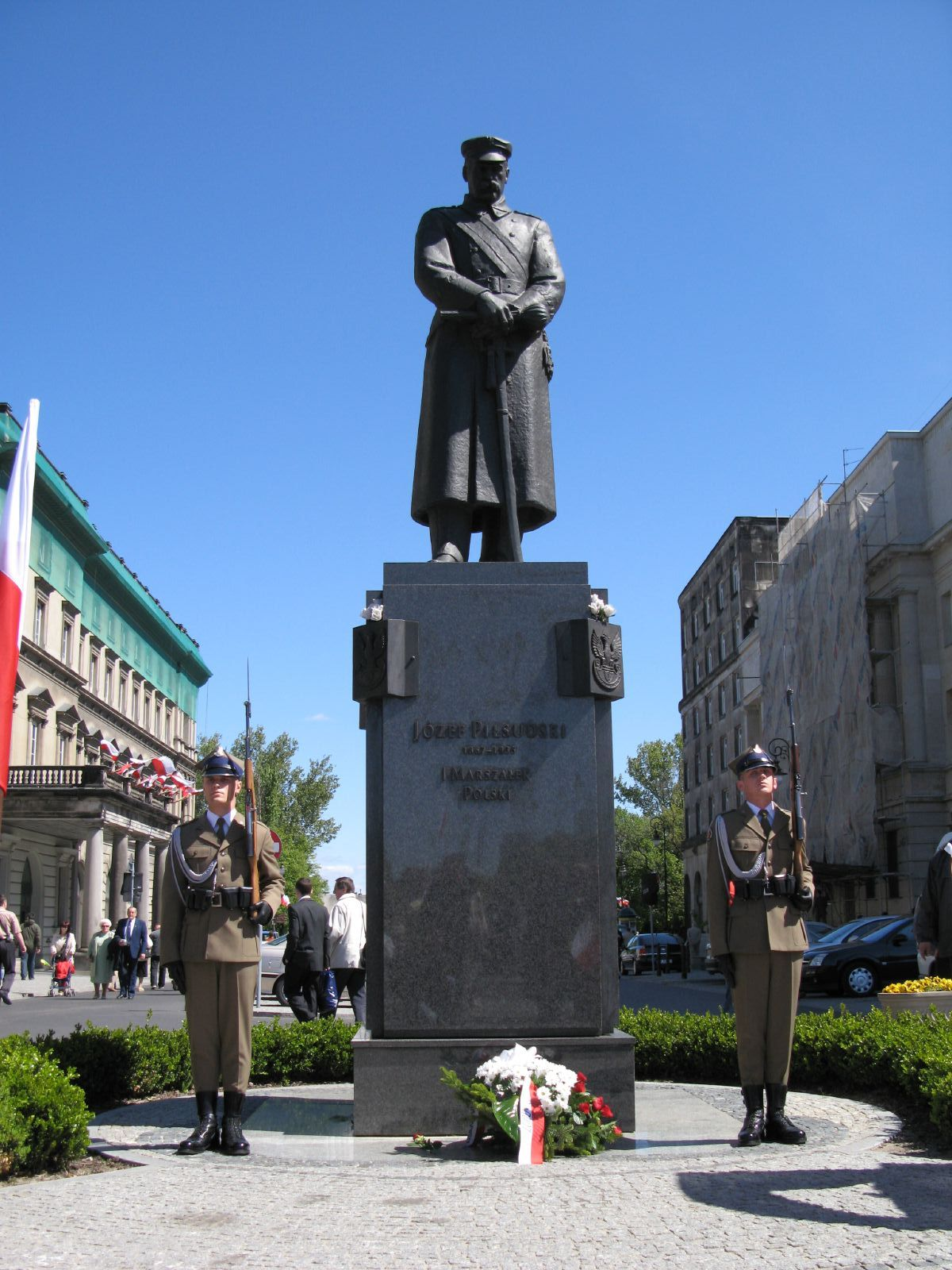
- Piłusdski statue and honour guards
- Interactive map of Józef Piłsudski Monument
- Location: ul. Tokarzewskiego-Karaszewicza, in front of the Piłsudski Square, Warsaw, Poland
- Coordinates: 52°14′29″N 21°00′50″E
- Designer: Tadeusz Łodziana
- Material: bronze, granite
- Height: 3 metres (9.8 ft) (statue only)
- Completion date: 14 August 1995
- Dedicated to: Józef Piłsudski

The Józef Piłsudski Monument in Warsaw was erected to honor Józef Piłsudski, a military leader, Marshal of Poland and one of the main figures responsible for Poland's regaining its independence. This 3 metres (9.8 ft) tall, bronze and granite statue is located near Piłsudski's Square and the Hotel Europejski, at Tokarzewski-Karaszewicz Street. It bears the inscriptions "Józef Piłsudski" and "Marshal of Poland".

Plans to raise the monument can be traced to 1990, when the president of Warsaw Stanisław Wyganowski endorsed the request of a group campaigning for the creation of a monument to Piłsudski. The monument, cast in the Polish Navy Shipyards, was unveiled on 14 August 1995, on the 75th anniversary of the Battle of Warsaw, which was commanded by Piłsudski. The unveiling was attended by the President of Poland, Lech Wałęsa, and Piłsudski's daughter, Jadwiga Piłsudska.

The original plans called for the monument to be raised at Na Rozdrożu Square, but were later modified to site it near the Łazienki. This decision was protested by the supporters of the monument, who declared the new location too minor, and the monument was moved to the current location. The current location has been and still is seen as controversial; for example the statue's designer, Tadeusz Łodziana, expressed his opposition to it in a letter shortly before the monument was unveiled, pointing out that it would cause the monument to be isolated from most ceremonies that take place on the square. Others have specifically criticized the fact that the location of the monument causes Polish soldiers to often face away from it during the guard change ceremony at the nearby Tomb of the Unknown Soldier, Warsaw, and during the observances for Polish Independence Day, which they regard as disrespectful.

== See also ==
- Józef Piłsudski Monument (Belweder), another monument in Warsaw dedicated to Piłsudski
