= Statue of Józef Piłsudski (Belweder) =

Monument in Warsaw, Poland

Józef Piłsudski Monument
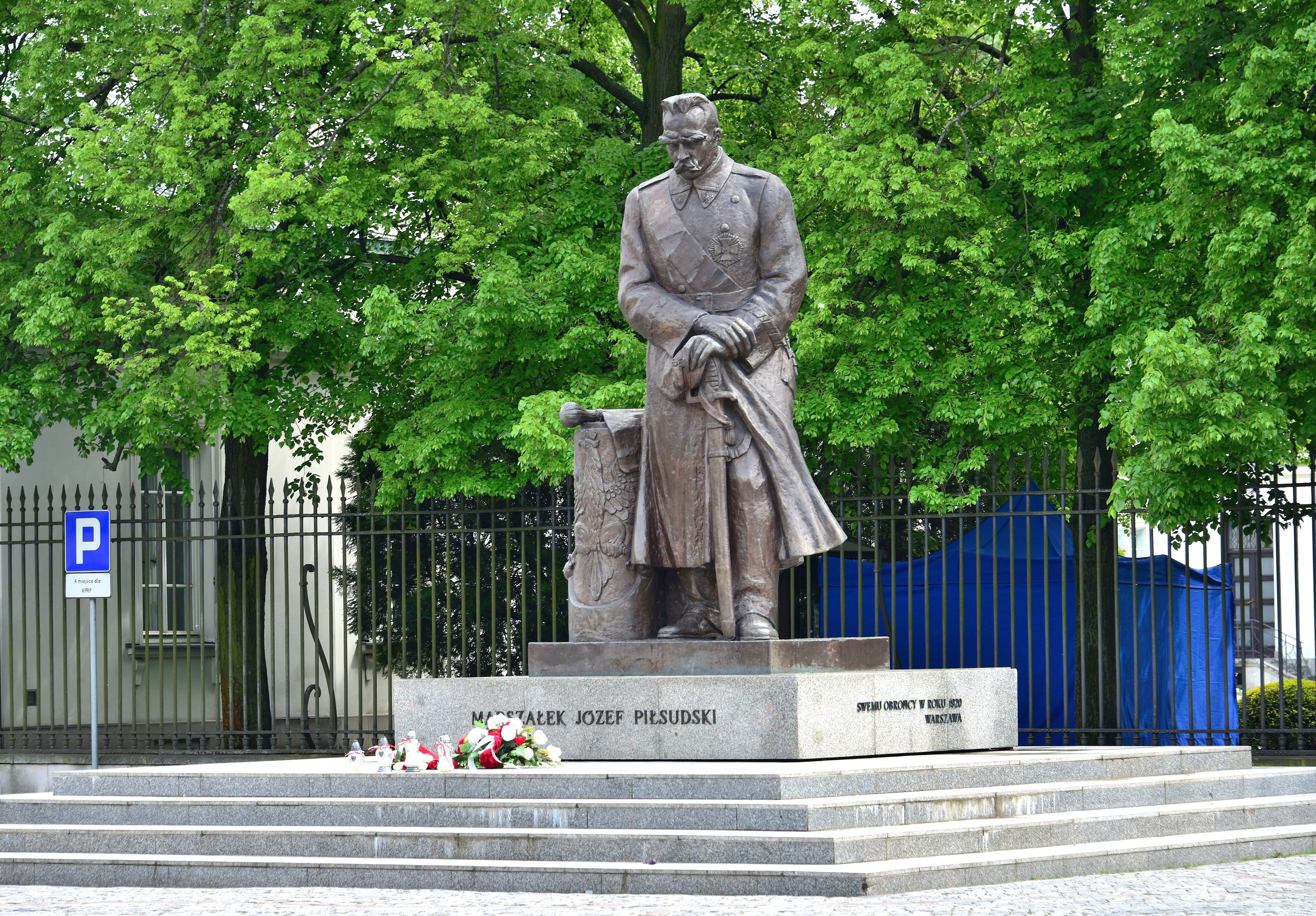
- The monument in 2019.
- Interactive map of Józef Piłsudski Monument
- Location: Belwederska Street, Downtown, Warsaw, Poland
- Coordinates: 52°12′48.56″N 21°01′36.42″E
- Designer: Stanisław Kazimierz Ostrowski
- Type: Statue
- Material: Gunmetal (statue); marble (pedestal)
- Height: 4.5 m (total); 3.5 m (statue)
- Opening date: 8 November 1998
- Dedicated to: Józef Piłsudski

The Józef Piłsudski Monument (Polish: Pomnik Józefa Piłsudskiego) is a gunmetal statue in Warsaw, Poland, within the Downtown district, placed next to the Belweder Palace, near the intersection of Belwederska Street, Ujazdów Avenue, and Bagatela Street. It is dedicated to Józef Piłsudski, a military officer and statesman who served as the Chief of State of Poland from 1918 to 1922, the Prime Minister of Poland from 1926 to 1928, and in 1930, as well as the commander-in-chief of the Polish Armed Forces and the Marshal of Poland. The monument was based on a sculpture made by Stanisław Kazimierz Ostrowski, prior to the Second World War. It was unveiled on 8 November 1998.

== History ==
The monument was proposed in 1997 by writer Jerzy Waldorff, and the next year, the idea was approved by the local municipal authorities. It was dedicated to Józef Piłsudski, a military officer and statesman who served as the Chief of State of Poland from 1918 to 1922, the Prime Minister of Poland from 1926 to 1928, and in 1930, as well as the commander-in-chief of the Polish Armed Forces and the Marshal of Poland. The design was based on a sculpture made by Stanisław Kazimierz Ostrowski, prior to the Second World War. It was cast in gunmetal from melted artillery shells that were donated by the Ministry of National Defence. It was unveiled on 8 November 1998, in the presence of Jerzy Waldorff, Marcin Święcicki, the mayor of Warsaw, and Jadwiga Piłsudska, Józef Piłsudski's daughter.

== Characteristics ==
The monument is placed next to the Belweder Palace, near the intersection of Belwederska Street, Ujazdów Avenue, and Bagatela Street.

The gunmetal statue depicts Józef Piłsudski wearing a military longcoat and a maciejówka cap, standing while resting his arms on a vertically placed sable. Next to him is a pedestal with an engraving of an eagle with a crown, from the coat of arms of Poland. On top of it is placed the bulava of the Marshal of Poland. The statue has a height of 3.5 m. It is placed on a 1-metre-tall marble pedestal. It features Polish inscriptions that read "Marszałek Józef Piłsudski" (translation: Marshal Józef Piłsudski), and "Swemu Obrońcy w 1920 r. – Warszawa" (translation: To its Defender of 1920, Warsaw).

== See also ==
- Statue of Józef Piłsudski (Piłsudski Square), another monument in Warsaw dedicated to Piłsudski
