= St. Michael the Archangel Church (Warsaw) =

- Cerkiew św. Michała Archanioła w Warszawie
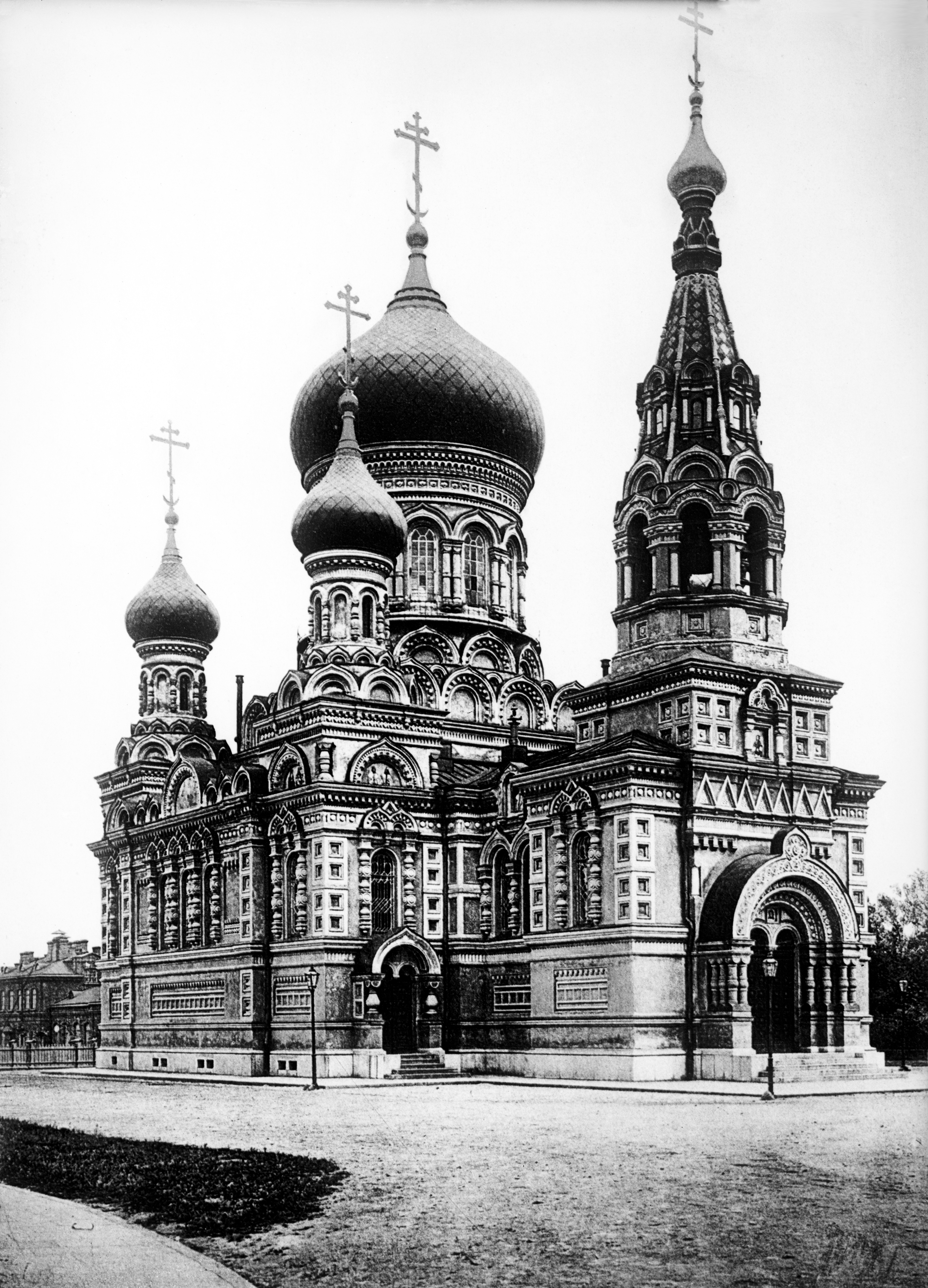
- A general view of the church.
- St. Michael the Archangel Church
- 52.220278°N 21.025556°E
- Location: Warsaw
- Country: Poland
- Denomination: Russian Orthodox Church

Architecture
- Architect: Captain Lüders
- Style: Russian Revival
- Groundbreaking: 1892
- Completed: 1894
- Closed: 1915
- Demolished: 1923

The St. Michael the Archangel Church (Polish: Cerkiew św. Michała Archanioła w Warszawie; Russian: Церковь Михаила Архангела) was an Orthodox church in Warsaw, located on Ujazdowskie Avenue (aleje Ujazdowskie), in the area of the current Plac na Rozdrożu (Crossroads Square). It was one of the military churches built for the needs of the Russian troops stationed in Warsaw, in particular the Lithuanian Regiment. Built in the 1890s, it was destroyed in 1923, during the recovery of churches recognized as symbols of Russian power during the Second Polish Republic.

== History ==
=== Circumstances of the construction ===
The building of the church of St. Archangel Michael in Warsaw falls within a period of increased investment in church building, which took place in the last years of the reign of Alexander III and the beginning of the rule of Nicholas II in the western borderlands of the Russian Empire. One of the main reasons for building new Orthodox churches was to supply their own churches for individual Russian military units. This church was an example of this.

The building was located at 12 Ujazdowskie Avenue, in the area of the city that had large numbers of Russian civilians. The area was particularly attractive to wealthy Russians. The building work was directed by engineer Captain Lüders and carried out between 1892 and 1894. The foundation stone of the new church was laid on June 16, 1892 at the site of an older, temporary military church. On December 21 of the same year, it was consecrated.

The church was part of a complex of barracks for a Lithuanian regiment that stretched between Szucha Avenue and Litewska and Nowowiejska streets. The construction was considered one of the most architecturally successful Orthodox churches built by the Russians in Warsaw. This was due to the elite nature of the regiment, for which it was intended. It had not been built according to a unified plan for military churches, but from a draft prepared specially for the occasion, which included a way of designing the building with regard to the environment (in particular with neighboring parks).

=== After World War I ===
Once Russian troops left Warsaw in 1915, the church lost its original purpose. Abandoned, it began to fall into disrepair. It was used for a short time as a parish church of the Evangelical Church but because of the past association with the Russian authorities in Warsaw it was demolished in 1923. Richard Mączewski believes that the main reason for the demolition was its bad condition due to abandonment and lack of maintenance. The destruction of the church was one of the episodes of the recovery of churches from the Orthodox church, which had been publicized abroad as evidence of the religious intolerance prevailing in Poland. Briefly in its place, there was "Łobzowianki" exhibition pavilions and a concert shell. Currently, the site is cut through by the Łazienkowska Thoroughfare.

== Architecture ==
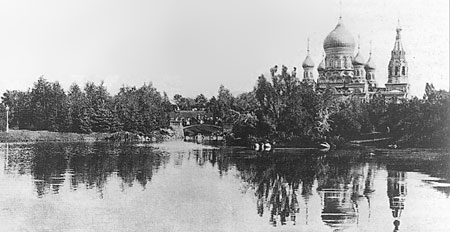
View of the church from Ujazdów Park.

The church had five domes with crosses and a bell tower with an additional dome over the entrance. It was designed in a late variety of Russian Revival architecture, the official style of the Russian Empire. All the domes were covered with galvanized zinc and painted green. Peter Paszkiewicz compares the layout of the temple of the church to Saint Basil's Cathedral in Moscow - as, in the case of this building, the entire design of the building was made up of seemingly independent elements. Between them there was a difference - the domes were a reduced version of the original.

The main church portal supported rich columns and was flanked by two smaller ones. Above the entrance stood a small domed bell tower finished in the traditional onion-shape. The richness of detailed decorations covering the walls of the church, as in the case of the church of St. Tatiana the Roman, covered the basic shape of the building. The interior of the church was as richly decorated. Frescoes on its walls were made by painter Alexandr Murashko, while the iconostasis was worked on by Belevich. The walls had copies of icons from St Volodymyr's Cathedral. The interior domes were gilded, and the floor of the temple was made of terracotta, imitating marble.

== Bibliography ==
- Paszkiewicz, P. Under the Scepter of the Romanovs: Russian Art in Warsaw 1815-1915 . Warsaw 1991.
- Sienkiewicz, H. Churches in the Land of Churches. Warsaw: TRIO, 2006. ISBN 978-83-60623-04-6.
- Sokol K., A. Pine. Domes on the Vistula River: Orthodox Churches in Central Poland in the years 1815-1915. Moscow: MID "Synergy" 2003, OCLC 749634498.
- Sokol K. Russkaya Varshava. MID Synergia, Moskva 2002, ISBN 5-7368-0252-X.
