= August Fryderyk Moszyński =

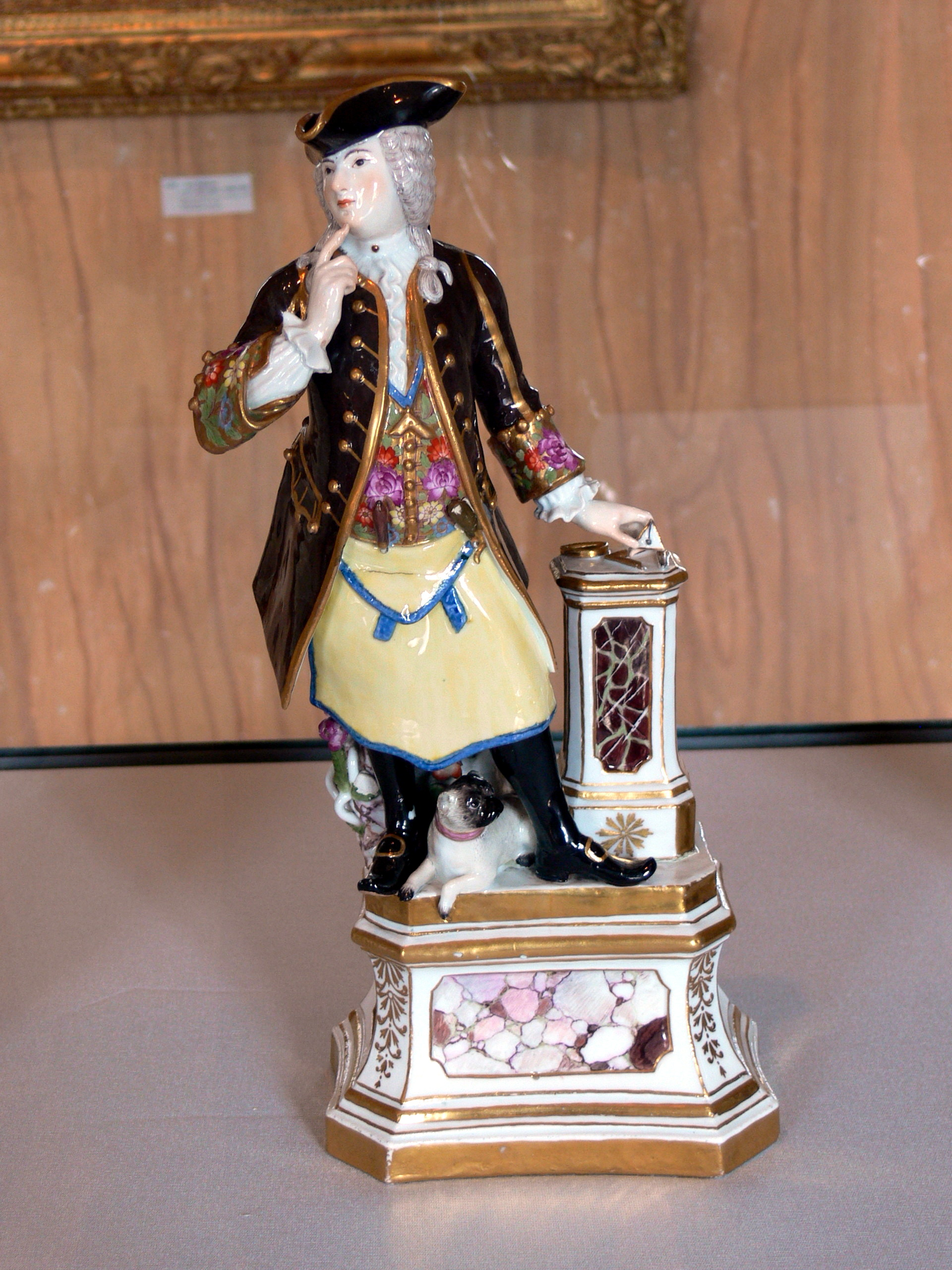
Moszyński represented on a Meissen porcelain figurine, circa 1769

August Fryderyk Moszyński (25 January 1731 – 11 June 1786) was Great Pantler of the Kingdom of Poland, collector, economist and freemason.

Moszyński was born in Dresden to Jan Kanty Moszyński, the Under Treasurer of August II the Strong, and Fredericka Alexandrine Cosel, the daughter of the same king. After attending a military school, he was taught architecture by Gaetano Chiaveri. He became close acquaintances with Stanisław August Poniatowski who, after becoming the king of Poland, invited him to the royal court in Warsaw. Poniatowski appointed Moszyński a member of the Treasury Council and commissioner of the Royal Mint. In 1765, Moszyński began to work as director of royal construction and director of the theater. After 1772, he was also in charge of the king's private collections. Moszyński designed churches in Tarnopol and Mikulińce. He died in Padua, Italy.
