= Jan Kanty Moszyński =

Polish-Lithuanian politician, noble (?-1737)

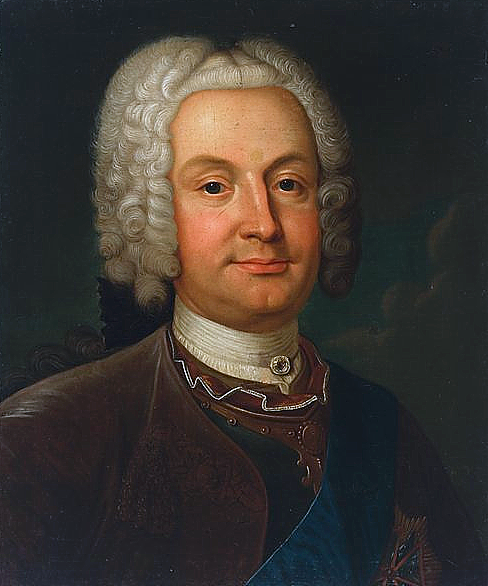
Jan Kanty Moszyński

Jan Kanty Moszyński (c. 1690 – 14 September 1737) was a Polish-Lithuanian nobleman and politician, Treasurer of the Crown Court from 1729. He came from a poor noble family but married the daughter of Augustus II the Strong. His grandfather was Andrzej Ludwik Moszyński (died 1683). His father, Aleksander Michał, lived in a small village in Podlasie and served as its treasurer. He was awarded the Order of White Eagle on 18 February 1730. Moszyński and more so his son Frederyk August Moszyński (1739–1786) built a notable museum collection.

== Bibliography ==
- Julian Bartoszewicz: Znakomici mężowie Polscy w XVIII w. Vol. 2, Petersburg 1856, pp. 117–198
