= Rainbow (Warsaw) =

- Tęcza
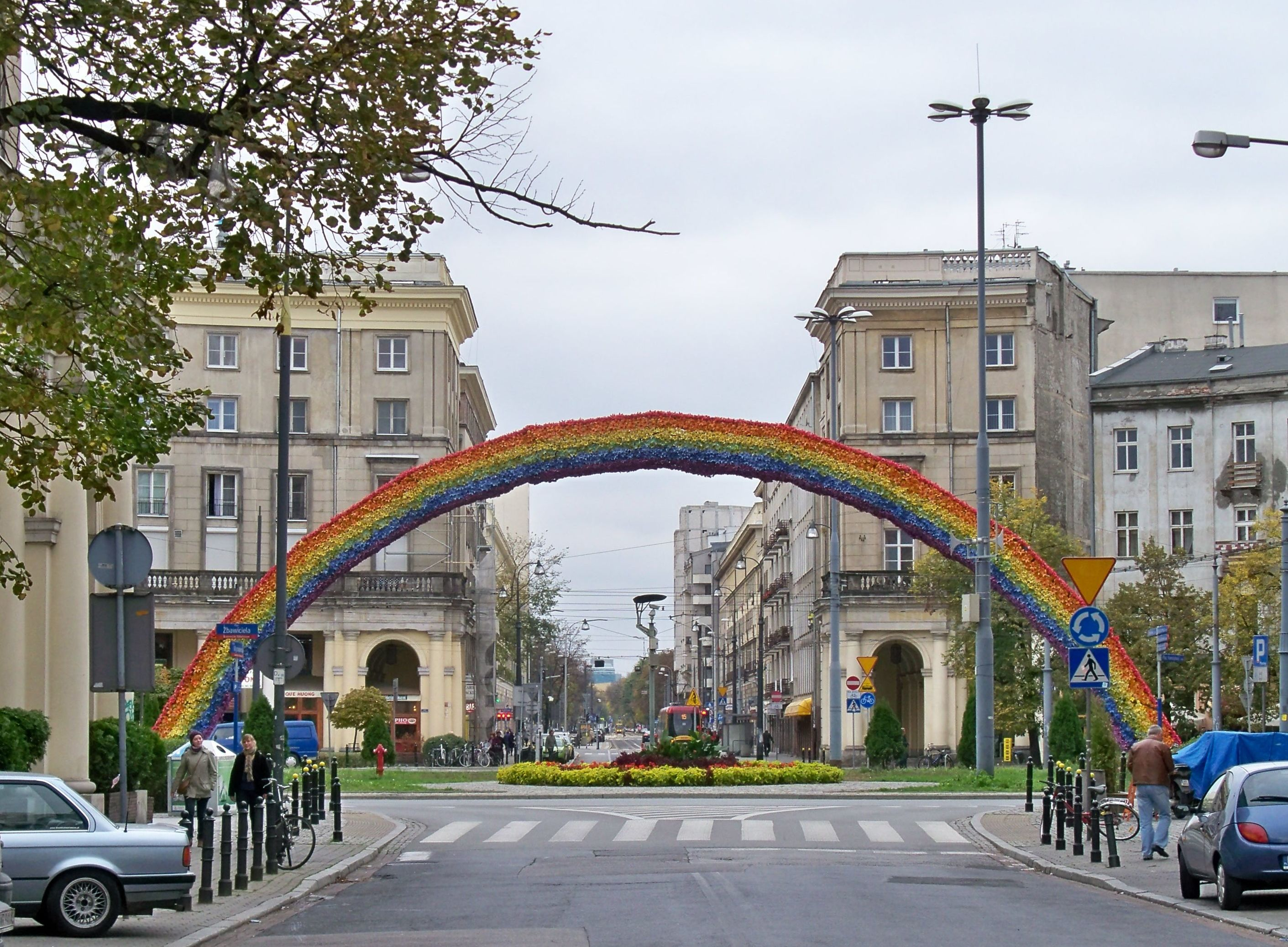
- The Tęcza fully constructed in October 2012
- Interactive map of Rainbow
- Location: Warsaw, Poland
- Coordinates: 52°13′11″N 21°01′05″E
- Designer: Julita Wójcik

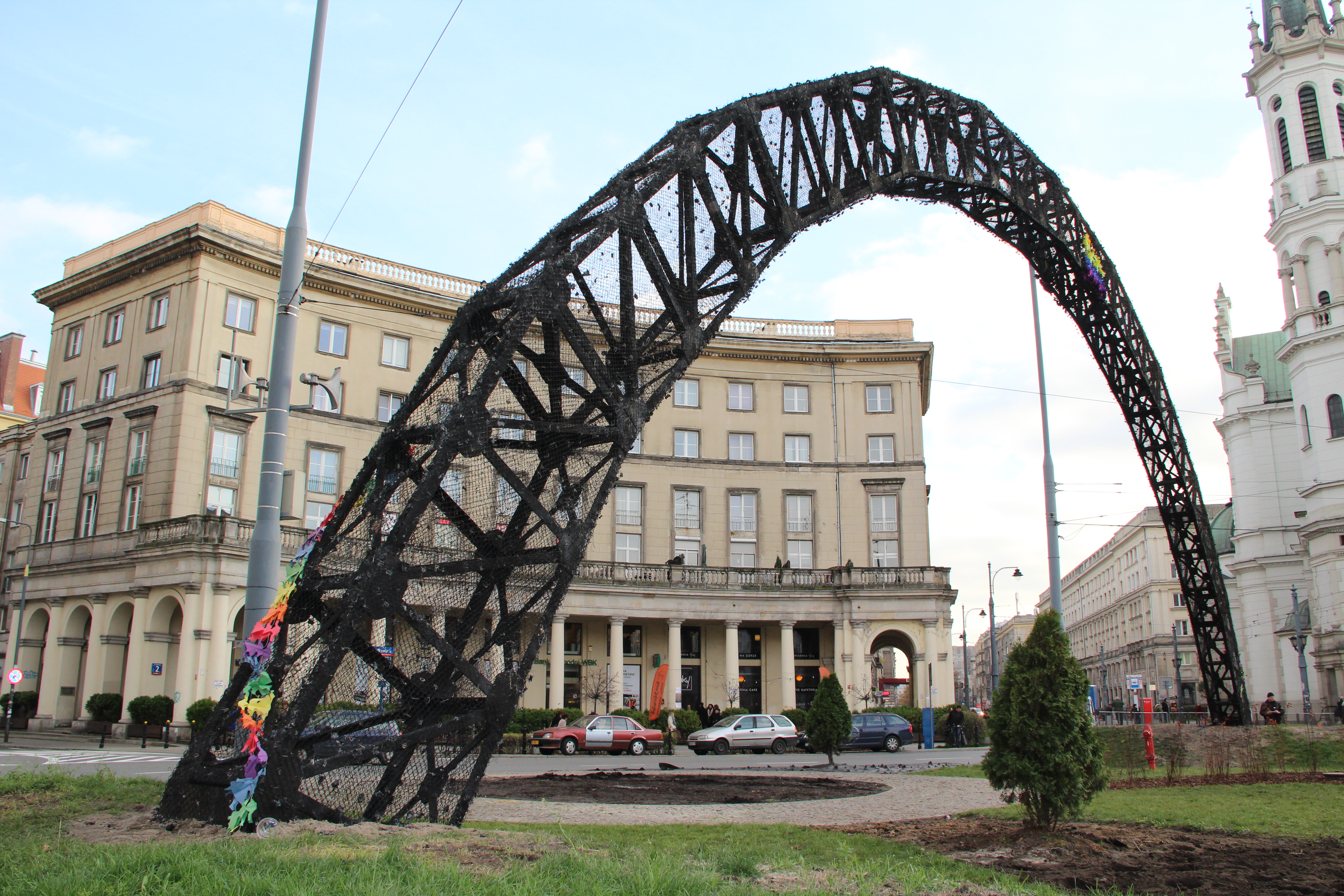
Tęcza, burned after riots, November 2013

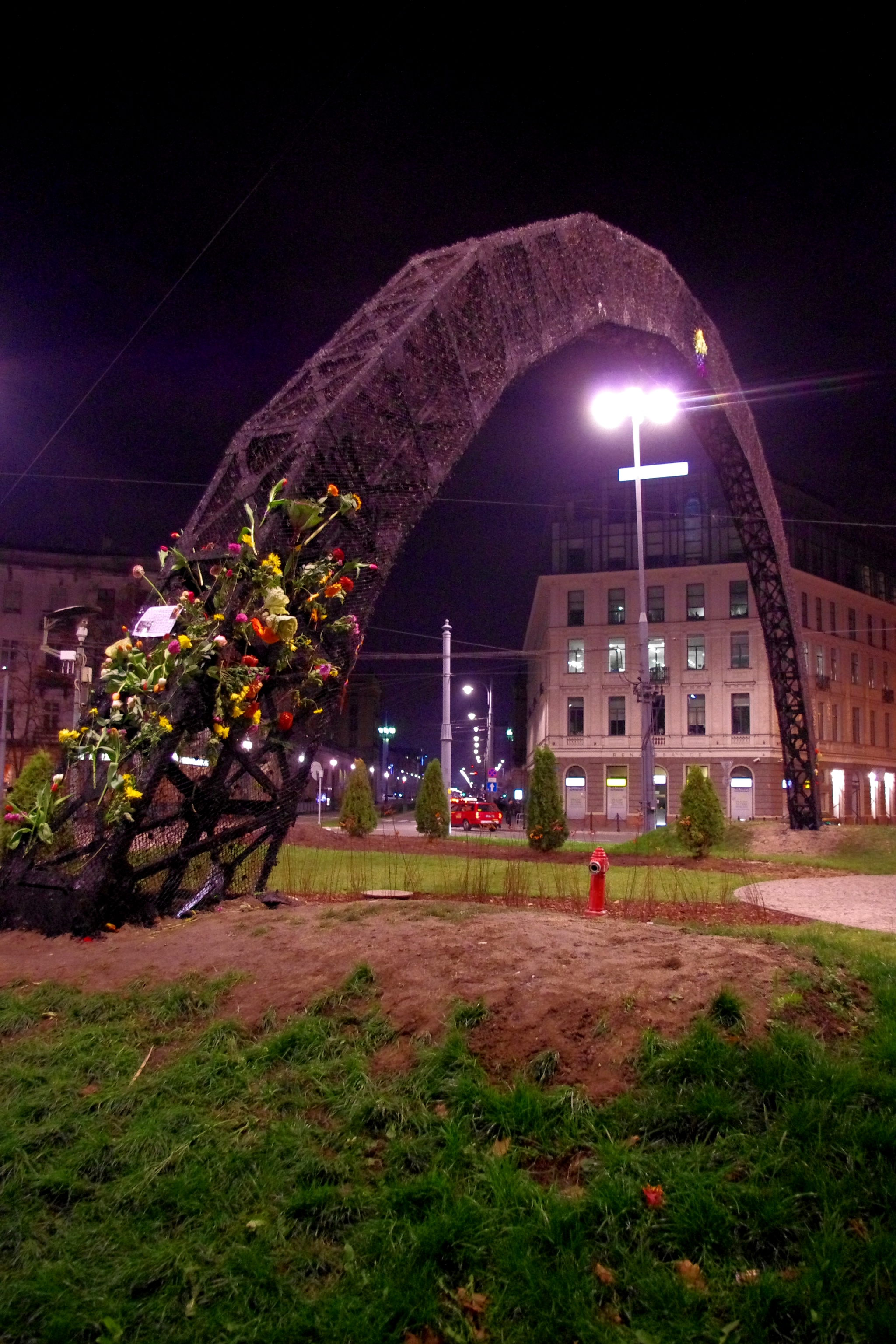
Tęcza, burned after riots, November 2012, with some volunteer decorations

The Rainbow (Polish: Tęcza (pronounced [ˈtɛntʂa])) was an artistic construction in the form of a giant rainbow made of artificial flowers erected on the Savior Square (Plac Zbawiciela) in the Polish capital of Warsaw in the summer of 2012. It was designed by Julita Wójcik and maintained by the Adam Mickiewicz Institute. It was vandalized several times, generating significant media coverage in Polish media, usually in the context of LGBT rights in Poland. The construction was permanently removed in August 2015.

== History ==
This installation is the third in a series of similar installations created; the second one was featured in front of the European Parliament in Brussels from 8 September 2011 during the Polish presidency of the European Union. The Warsaw Tęcza was based on the Brussels one, which was moved to Warsaw on 8 June 2012. For this project, Wójcik received the Paszport Polityki award. The installation was supposed to evoke positive feelings related to the rainbow, such as love, peace and hope, and was intended to be a universal, apolitical symbol. However, far-right nationalist and Catholic groups identified it with the rainbow flag, a symbol of the LGBT movement.

During the night of 26–27 August 2015, the construction for holding flowers was officially and permanently dismantled. Three years later, on 9 June 2018, a new water and light-based installation was unveiled, but it was active only for a few hours for the 2018 Parada Równości event.

== Vandalism and controversies ==
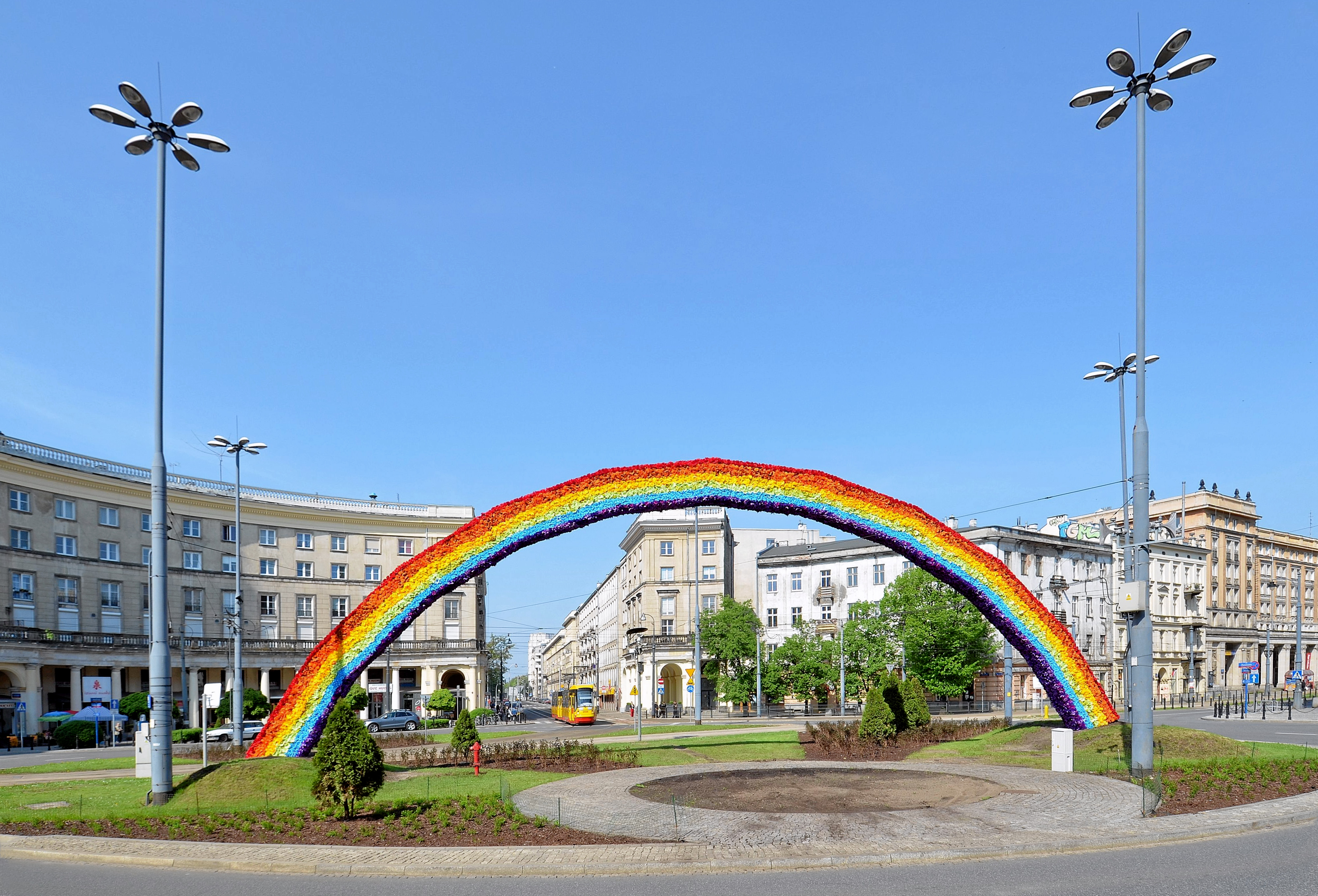
Tęcza, fully constructed again, May 2014

As the rainbow symbol is also associated with the LGBT movement, and because it contains six colors just like the LGBT flag, the Tęcza in the Savior Square in Warsaw proved controversial, in part because it was placed in front of a church. The installation was damaged five times as of November 2013, with the usual method of vandalism being arson. The installation was damaged on 13 September 2012; on 1 January 2013 (ruled to be accidental fireworks damage) and again three days later on 4 January; in July 2013; and once again during marches on Polish Independence Day on 11 November 2013. The November 2013 incident occurred in the background of a wider riot by right-wing nationalists, who clashed with police and vandalized other parts of the city as well, also attacking the Russian embassy.

On 7 December 2014, the rainbow was set on fire by an unknown man just before 01:30. The flames were put out quickly by a police officer. The man who lit the fire was not apprehended.

The installation was criticized by conservative and right-wing figures. Law and Justice politician Bartosz Kownacki derogatorily called the installation a "faggot rainbow" (pedalska tęcza). Another Law and Justice politician, Stanisław Pięta, complained that the "hideous rainbow had hurt the feelings of believers" attending the nearby Church of the Holiest Saviour. Priest Tadeusz Rydzyk, of Radio Maryja fame, described it as a "symbol of deviancy".

== See also ==
- Parada Równości
