= Weronika Kostyrko =

Polish journalist and writer (born 1962)

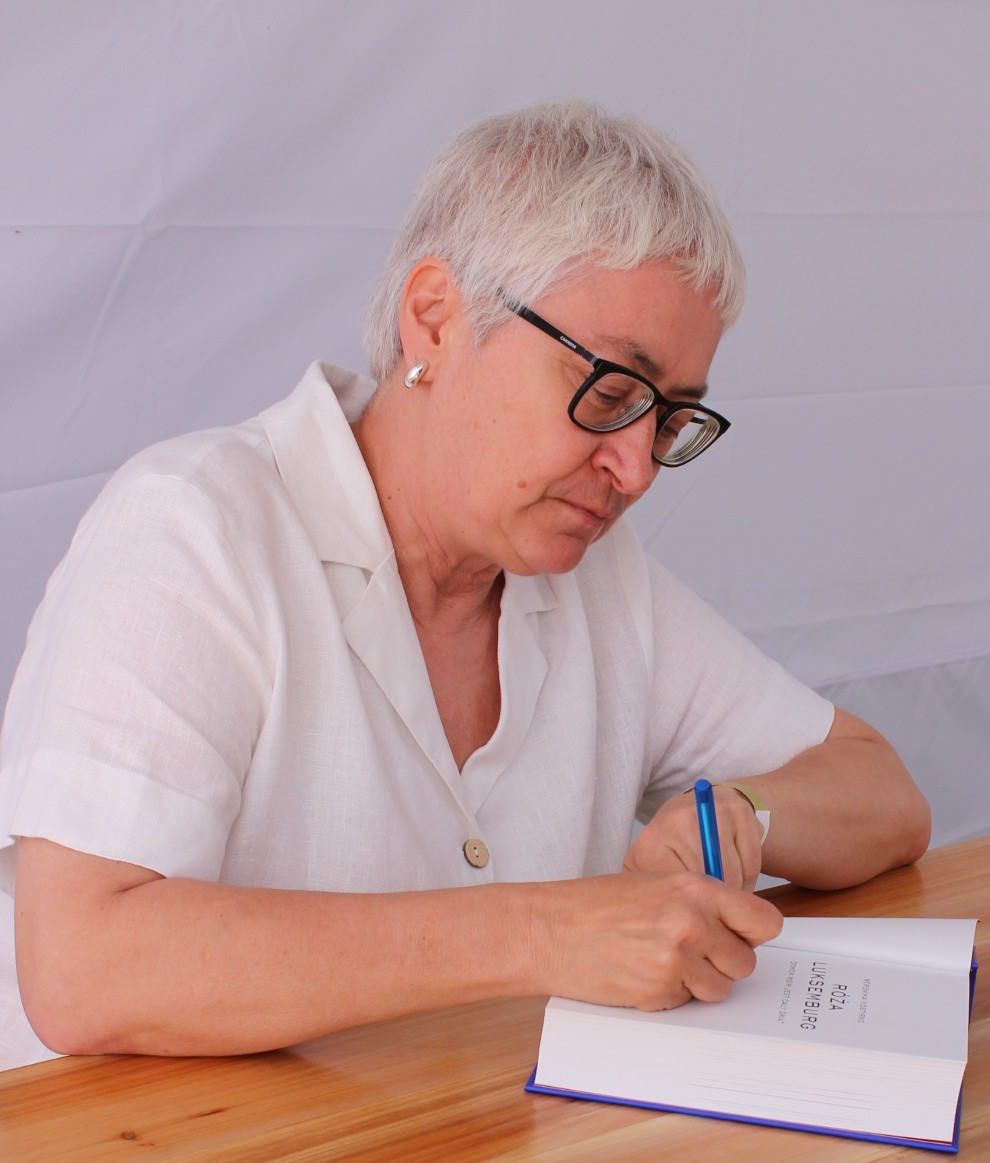
- Weronika Kostyrko, 2025
- Born: 14 August 1962 (age 63)
- Citizenship: Polish
- Occupations: Writer, journalist

Weronika Kostyrko (born 14 August 1962) is a journalist and writer.

== Biography ==
She graduated from the University of Warsaw. She worked at Gazeta Wyborcza from 1991 until 2011, in the international section, and as the editor-in-chief of the Culture.pl website. She worked as a lecturer at Collegium Civitas.

== Books ==
- Tancerka i zagłada. Historia Poli Nireńskiej. Warszawa: Wydawnictwo Czerwone i Czarne. 2019. ISBN 978-83-66219-09-0.
- Róża Luksemburg. Domem moim jest cały świat. Warszawa: Wydawnictwo Marginesy. 2024. ISBN 978-83-68226-71-3.

== Awards and honours ==
- Nomination for the Nike Award for Tancerka i zagłada. Historia Poli Nireńskiej (2020)
- Nomination for the Nike Award for Róża Luksemburg. Domem moim jest cały świat (2025)
- Finalist of the Upper Silesian Literary Award "Juliusz" for Róża Luksemburg. Domem moim jest cały świat (2025)
- Nomination for the Marcin Król Award for Róża Luksemburg. Domem moim jest cały świat (2025)
- Julian Tuwim Literary Award (2025)
