= Confectioners Palace =

- Pałacyk Cukrowników
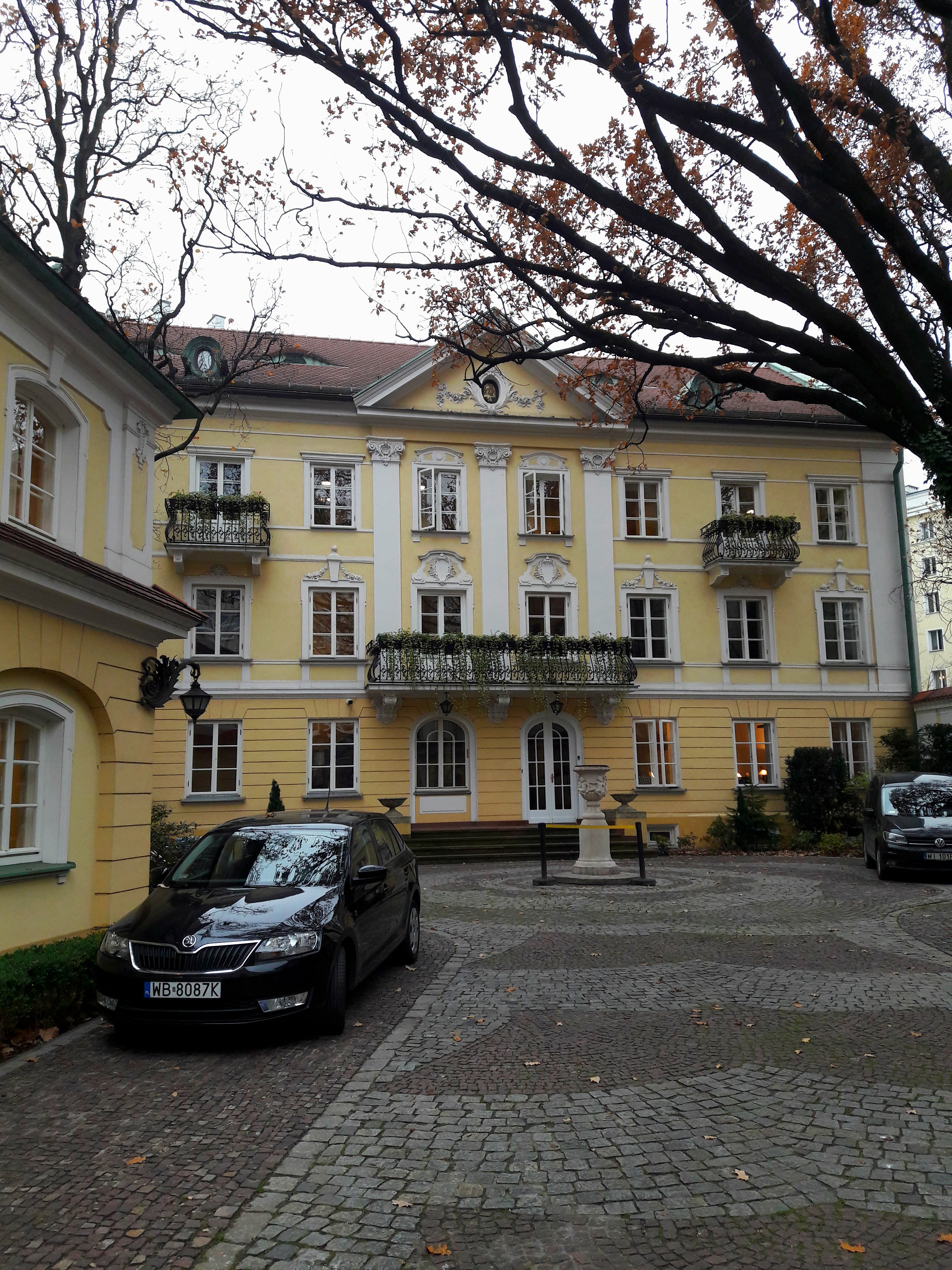
- The building in 2011

- Location of the Sugar Palace in Poland
- 52°13′N 21°01′E
- Location: Warsaw, Mazowsze Province, Poland

History
- Built: 1877
- Rebuilt: 1926

Site notes
- Architectural style: Neoclassical
- Restored: 1987
- Current use: Adam Mickiewicz Institute

The Confectioners Palace (Polish: Pałacyk Cukrowników; official name: Pałacyk Zarządu Spółek Cukrowni Lubelskich, "Palace of the Board of Lublin Province Sugar Producers") is a historic building at 25 Mokotowska Street in Warsaw, Poland. It now houses the Adam Mickiewicz Institute.

== History ==
In the second half of the 19th century, this site on Warsaw's ulica Mokotowska (Mokotów Street) belonged to Józef Kaczyński. In 1877, on part of the parcel, a cottage was built for Kazimiera Ćwierczakiewiczowa (née Kaczyńska). In 1907, the cottage was taken over by the first owner's descendant, Mieczysław Kaczyński, who with Wacław Cywiński set up there a printing house, a lithography establishment, and a bag factory.

In 1910, the building was leased by the Board of Lublin Province Sugar Producers "Lubelskie", "Garbów", "Lublin", and "Nielepów". About 1915, architect Tadeusz Zieliński was commissioned to remodel the facility; according to some sources, it was completely rebuilt. In 1922, the Board of Lublin Province Sugar Producers (Zarząd Cukrowni Lubelskich) purchased the building, and its reconstruction was completed in 1926. The cottage, in the rear, was given a rococo stylization, and two wings were added in front, enclosing the entrance to a courtyard.

In 1935, the palace was bought by Mieczysław Broniewski, a sugar industrialist, who adapted the building as a family residence to a design by Antoni Jawornicki. The Board of Lublin Province Sugar Producers moved to 8 ulica Koszykowa in Warsaw.

During World War II, the building was occupied by the German Gestapo. It was not destroyed, due to its location in Warsaw's "German district".

After World War II, the building was renovated to house, among other institutions, the Polish Academy of Sciences Mathematics Institute. In 1987 the building underwent extensive renovation of its façade. It now houses the Adam Mickiewicz Institute.
