= Saviour Square =

Urban square and roundabout in Warsaw, Poland

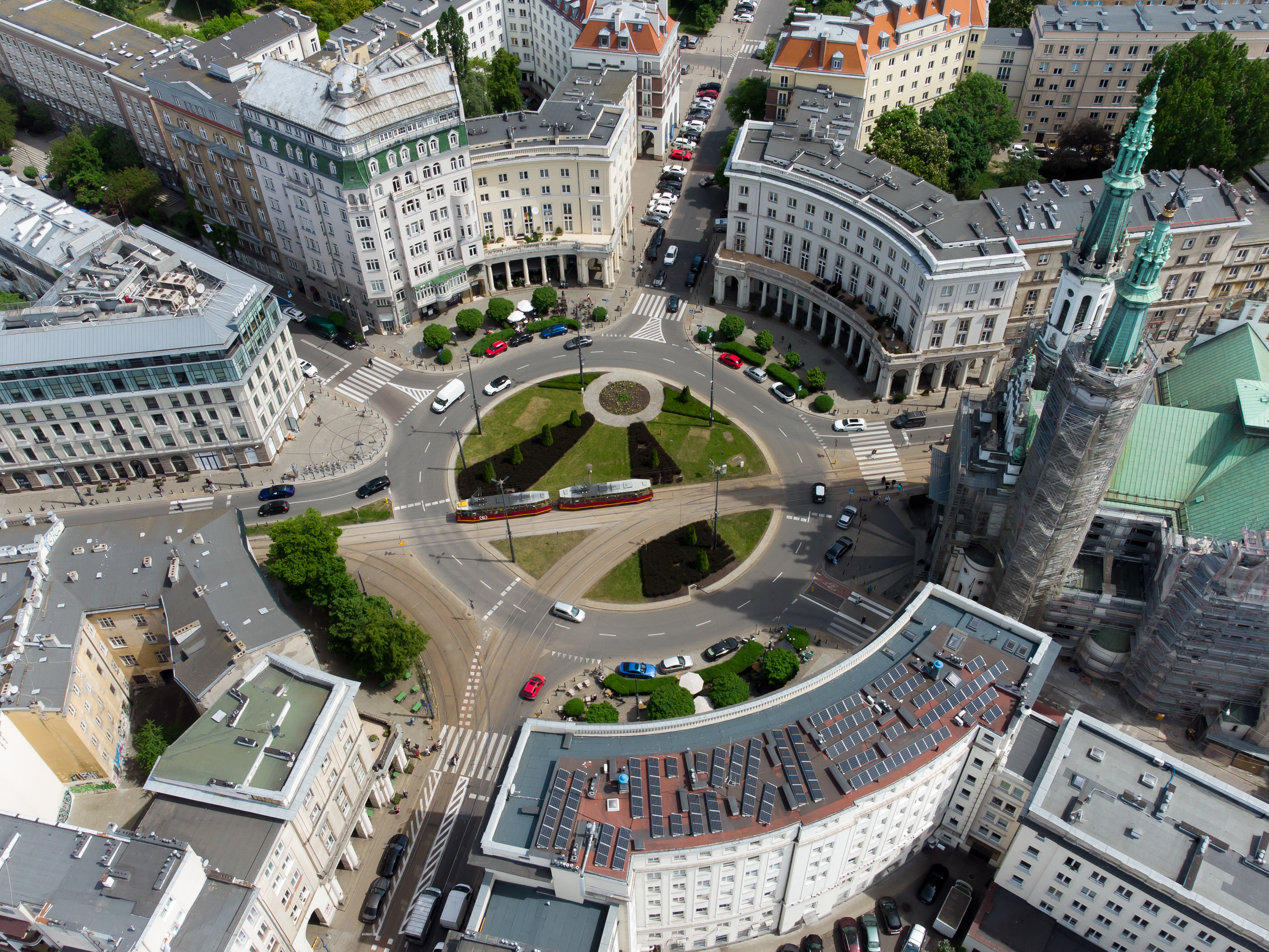
- Saviour Square in 2022

- Location within Warsaw
- Location: Downtown, Warsaw, Poland
- Coordinates: 52°13′11″N 21°01′04″E
- North: Marszałkowska Street; Mokotowska Street
- East: Wyzwolenia Avenue
- South: Marszałkowska Street; Mokotowska Street
- West: Nowowiejska Street

Construction
- Completion: c. 1768

Other
- Designer: Jan Chrystian Schuch

Saviour Square (Polish: Plac Zbawiciela) is an urban square and roundabout in Downtown, Warsaw, Poland. It is formed by the intersection of Marszałkowska Street, Mokotowska Street, Nowowiejska Street, and Wyzwolenia Avenue.

The square was originally constructed about 1768. It is surrounded by postwar tenements of the Marshal Residential District, several prewar tenements, and the early-20th-century Church of the Holiest Saviour.

== History ==
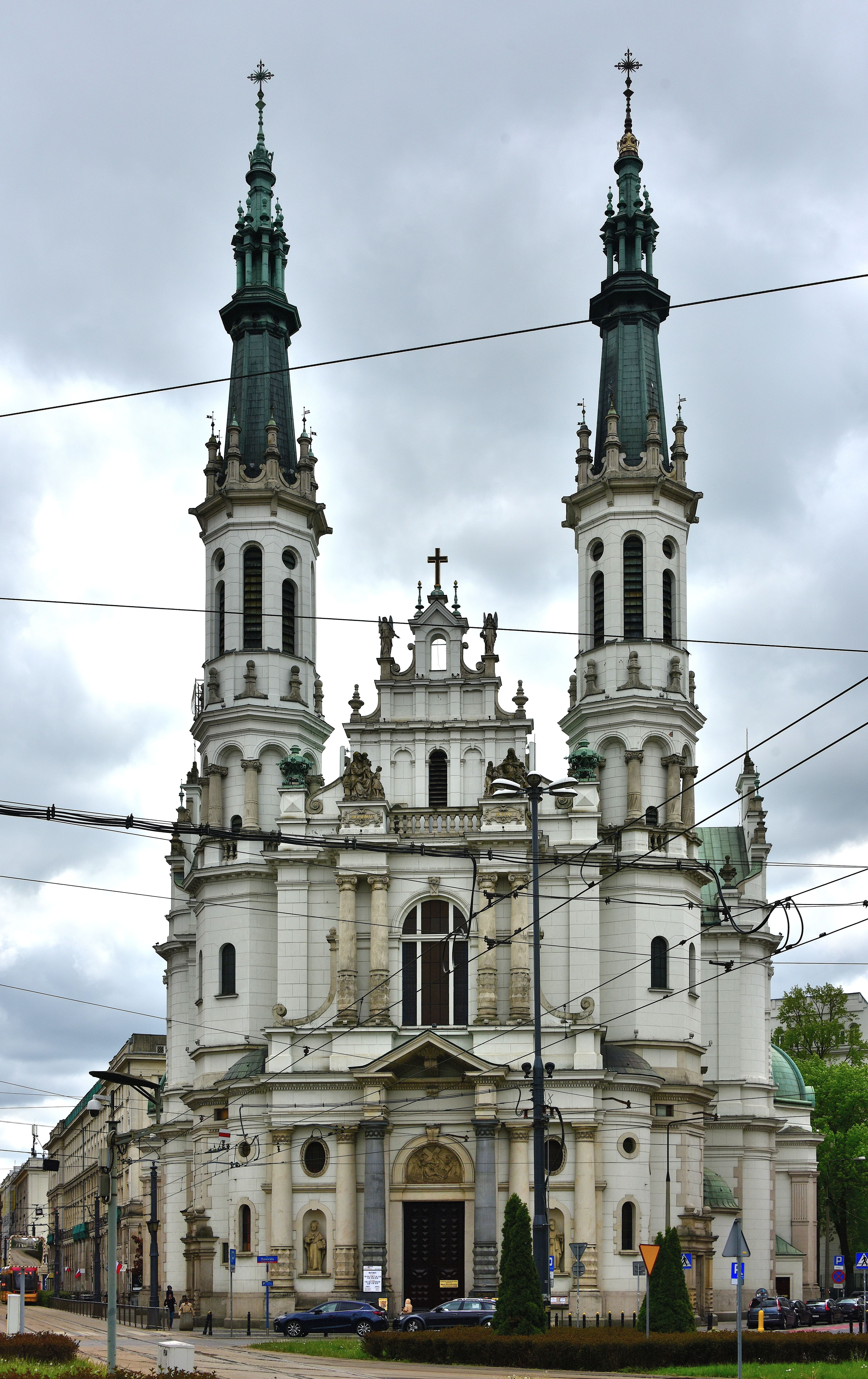
The Church of the Holiest Saviour, built between 1901 and 1927

The square was developed around 1768, as part of the Stanislavian Axis, an urban layout made of five circular squares and roads, connecting Warsaw with Ujazdów Castle, developed from the initiative of king Stanisław August Poniatowski. It was designed by Jan Chrystian Schuch. Due to its shape, it was known as the Rotunda.

In 1784, from the initiative of king Stanisław August Poniatowski, alongside Nowowiejska Street, the settlement of Nowa Wieś (lit. from Polish: New Village) was built, where the inhabitants of the village of Ujazdów, who were displaced due to construction of Ujazdów Castle there, were settled. It consisted of twelve houses, placed symmetrically on both sides of the street, located between Saviour Square and Polytechnic Square.

In 1822, next to the square, between Marszałkowska and Mokotowska Streets, the Piskorowski Farm, a 5-hectare farm, with an orchard and a greenhouse vineyard, was founded. In 1829, on a part of the farmland, the Garnier family built the Red Tavern (Polish: Czerowna Karczma), made from red brick.

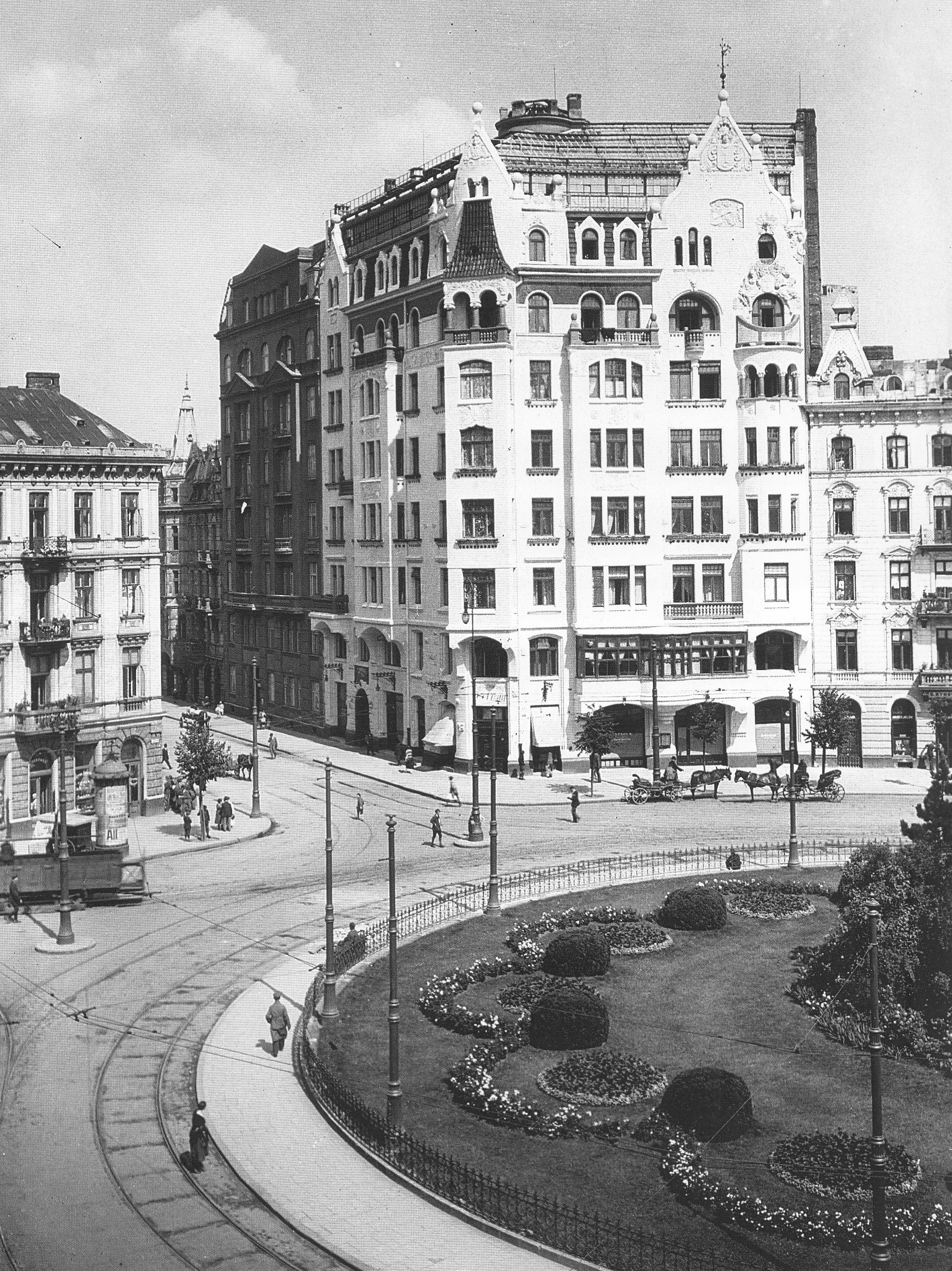
Saviour Square in 1920

After 1880, tenements were constructed around the square. Around 1881, the square was connected with the horsecar line, which was replaced in 1908 with an electric tram line. The tram track followed the same path as the roundabout until 1968, when the track was rebuilt to go through the middle of the square.

Between 1901 and 1927, in the place where the tavern had been, the Catholic Church of the Holiest Saviour was constructed. In 1922, the square was named Saviour Square after it.

During the Second World War, while the city was under the German occupation, the Ringstand small bunker made from reinforced concrete was placed at the square. It was one of 60 bunkers of its type, installed across the city, as part of the fortification project known as Festung Warschau. The bunker was part of the fortification lines stretching between Narutowicz Square and the Vistula river. It was discovered in 2011 during the renovation works. It was originally planned to remove and relocate it to the Polish Army Museum, however, it was ultimately decided to leave it in its current location.

In 1944, during the Warsaw Uprising, the square and its surrounding area was a site of battle, which among others, included the Ruczaj Battalion of the Home Army. It was controlled by the German forces, from the bunker in the nearby building of the former Ministry of War. After the fall of the uprising, the buildings around the square were destroyed by the German forces. This included the Church of the Holiest Saviour, in which a bomb was detonated. It was fully reconstructed in 1955.

Between 1950 and 1952, around the southern portion of the square, socialist realistic multifamily buildings, with a colonnade and stores behind the arcade, were constructed. The three best-preserved tenements were also reconstructed. The area became part of a then-developed housing estate of the Marshal Residential District.

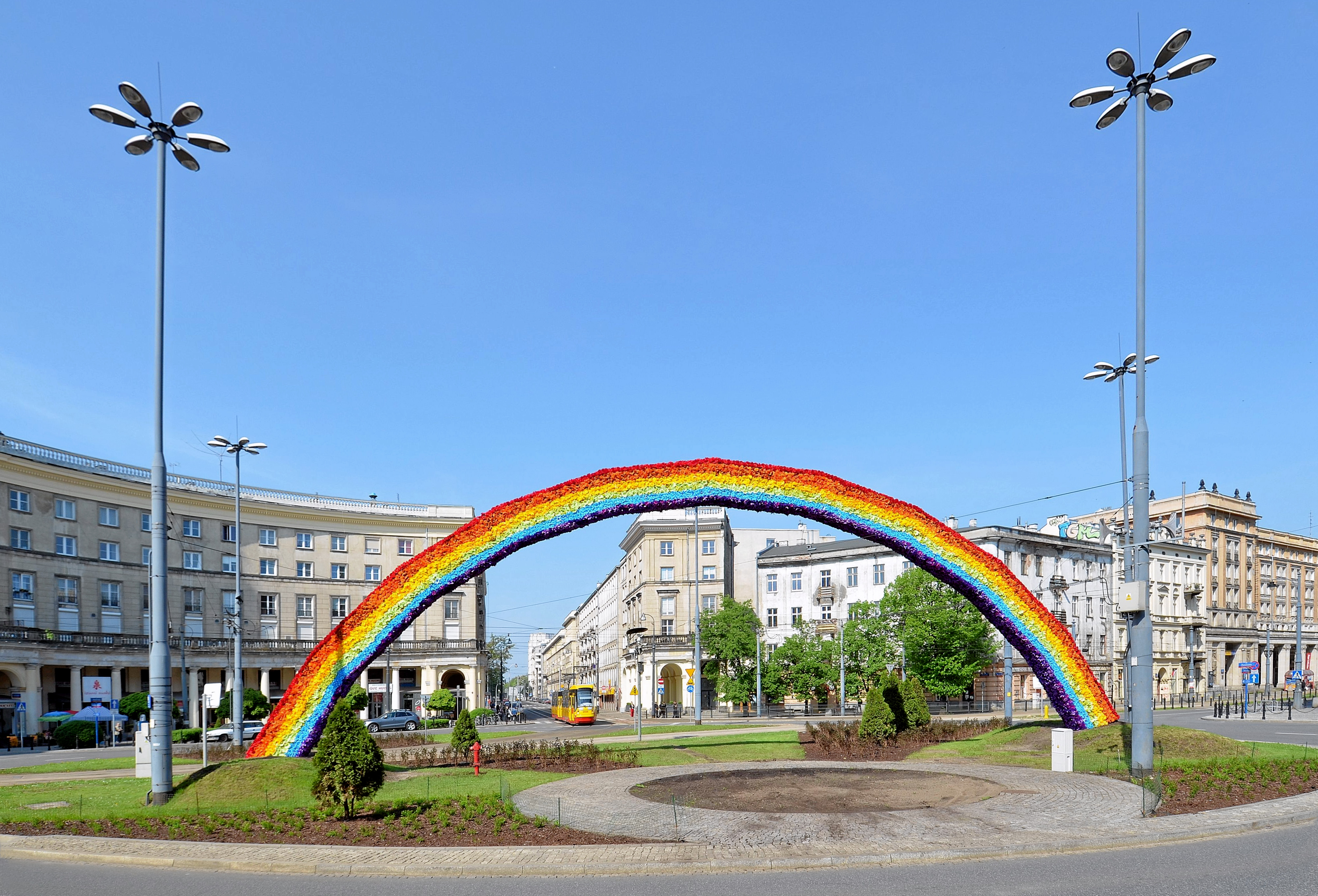
Rainbow art installation, erected 2012, removed 2015

On 8 July 2012, at the square, the Rainbow art installation, made by Julita Wójcik, which consisted of a metal arch, covered in thousands of plastic colourful flowers, was unveiled. It became associated with the LGBT rights movement due its resemblance to its symbol, the rainbow flag. Said association, and its location near the Church if the Holiest Saviour, caused numerous controversies and protests by conservative groups, with many calls for its removal. The sculpture was set on fire during the night from 12 to 13 October 2012 by an arsonist. Between 2012 and 2014, the installation was set on fire by arsonists four more times, including by a large group of far-right rioters during the celebrations of the National Independence Day of Poland on 11 November 2013. It was rebuilt each time. It was eventually permanently removed by the city on 27 August 2015.

In the first quarter of the 21st century, the square has become a meeting place for students, artists, and hipsters.

== Characteristics ==
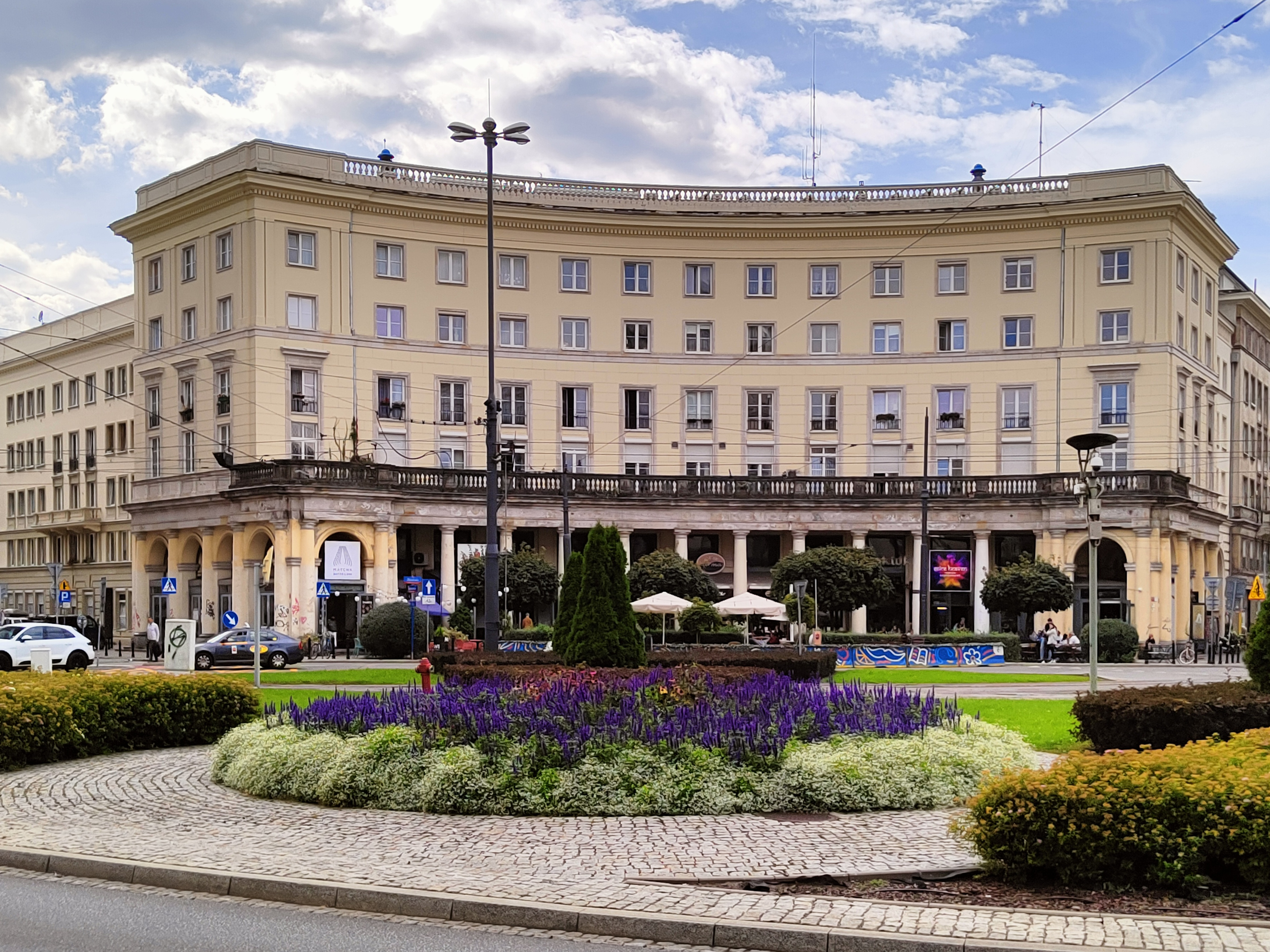
17 Mokotowska Street, at Saviour Square

Saviour Square forms a roundabout at the intersection of Marszałkowska Street, Mokotowska Street, Nowowiejska Street, and Wyzwolenia Avenue.

The square is enclosed by tenements of the Marshal Residential District, with a colonnade and shops within the arcade; by three historical tenements: the Pawłowicz Tenement (ca. 1894), Domański Tenement (1895), and Jasieńczyk-Jabłoński Tenement (1910); and by the early-20th-century Catholic Church of the Holiest Saviour.
