= Adam Mickiewicz Institute =

Polish cultural institution

Instytut Adama Mickiewicza

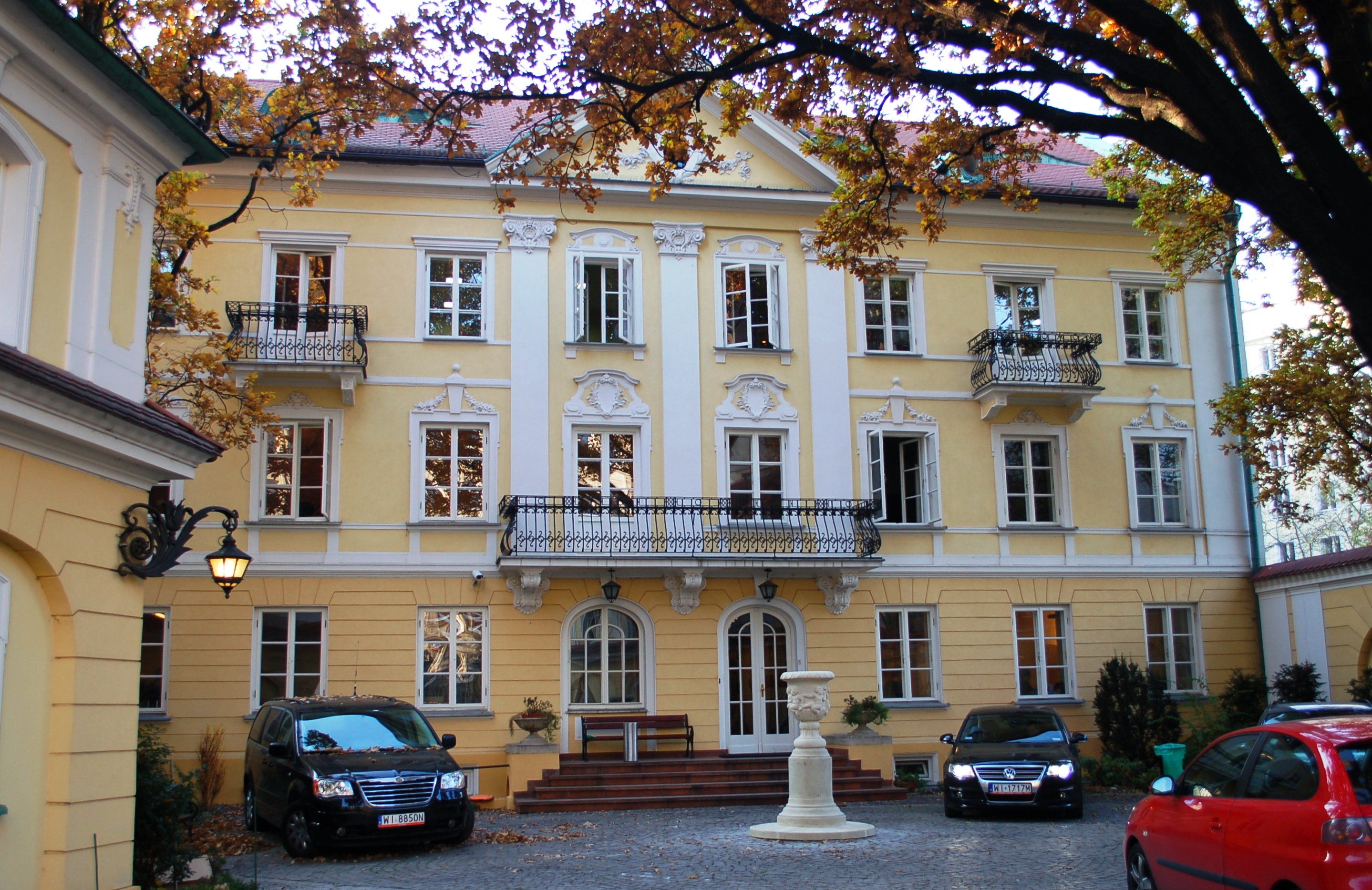
- Headquarters in the Sugar Palace, Warsaw
- Founded: 1 March 2000; 26 years ago
- Founder: Polish Government
- Type: Cultural institution
- Location: ulica Mokotowska 25 (the Sugar Palace), Warsaw
- Region served: 20 countries, worldwide
- Product: Polish cultural and language education
- Key people: Barbara Schabowska, Director
- Website: iam.pl

The Adam Mickiewicz Institute (Polish: Instytut Adama Mickiewicza) is a government-sponsored organization funded by Poland's Ministry of Culture and National Heritage, and headquartered at 25 Mokotowska Street (the Sugar Palace) in Warsaw.

Named after Polish national poet Adam Mickiewicz, its goal is to promote the Polish language and Polish culture abroad. Since 2001, the institute operates Culture.pl, a web portal documenting various aspects of Polish culture. As of 2025, Culture.pl is available in 8 languages including Polish and English.

== Activities ==
Besides a large number of associated poets, essayists, writers, translators, artists; literary, music, and film critics; and curators, the Institute includes Barbara Schabowska, the Director (the former were Krzysztof Olendzki and Paweł Potoroczyn), as well as three deputy directors and a number of projects and programmes managers.

In addition to the Ministry-of-Culture-sponsored Adam Mickiewicz Institute, there are Polish Cultural Institutes, sponsored by the Polish Ministry of Foreign Affairs, in over 22 major foreign cities, including Berlin, Bratislava, Budapest, Bucharest, Düsseldorf, Kyiv, Leipzig, London, Minsk, Moscow, New York City, Paris, Prague, Rome, Saint Petersburg, Sofia, Stockholm, Tel Aviv, Vienna, and Vilnius.

While the Adam Mickiewicz Institute frequently collaborates with the Polish Cultural Institutes, each institution is independent of the other and is sponsored by a different Polish government ministry.

=== Projects and programmes ===
- Polska 100 – to mark the centenary of Poland's independence by many activities in six areas: music, design, visual arts, film, theatre, and new technologies.
- I, CULTURE Orchestra – musical project for young musicians from Poland, Armenia, Azerbaijan, Belarus, Georgia, Hungary, Moldova and Ukraine.
- Digital Culture – to support international presence of Polish digital artists (the Digital Cultures conference is among other activities on this track).
- Polska Design Programme
- Don`t Panic! We`re from Poland – promotes contemporary Polish music abroad

== Gallery ==
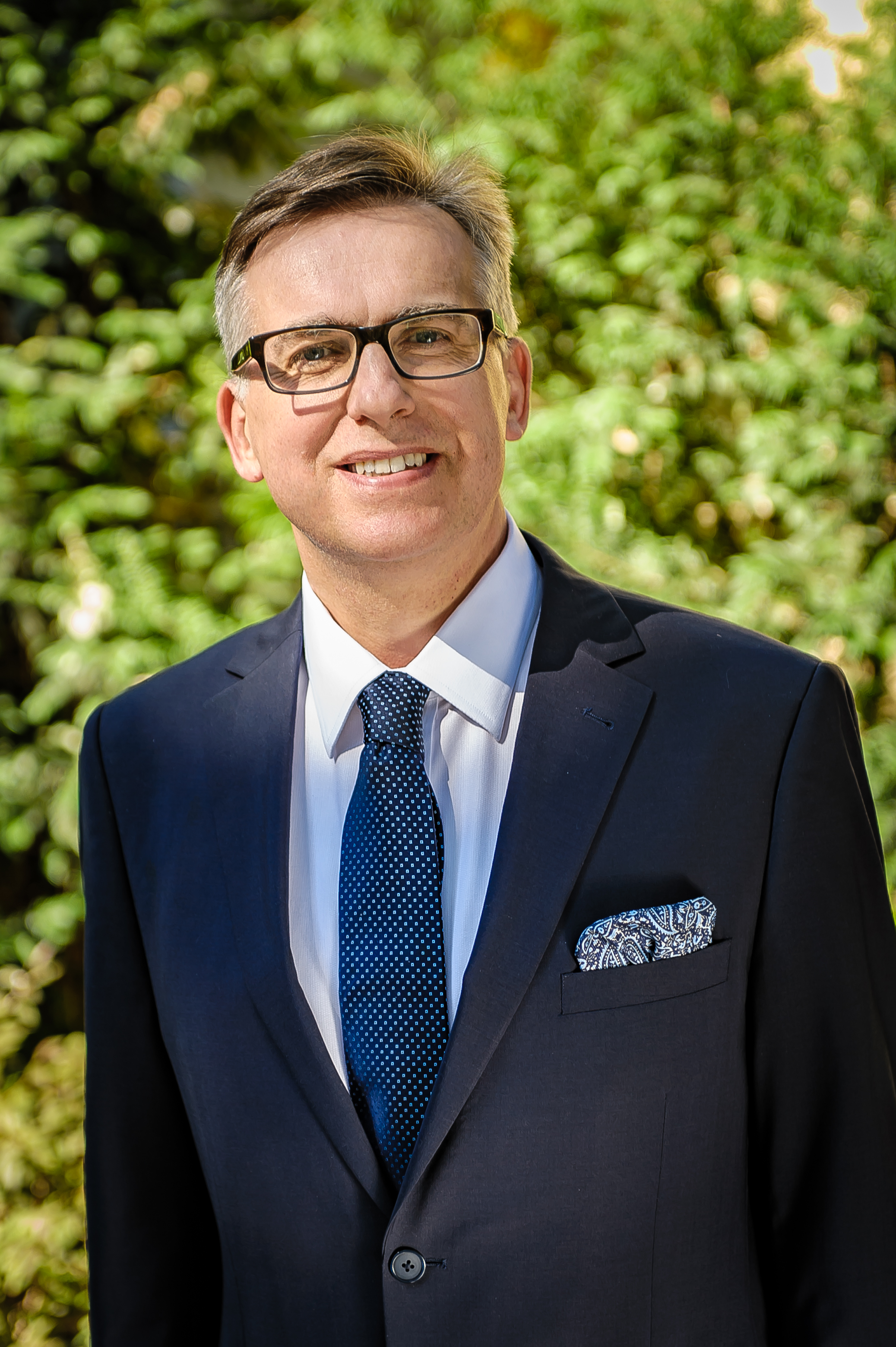
Krzysztof Olendzki - the Head Director of Adam Mickiewicz Institute (2016–2019)

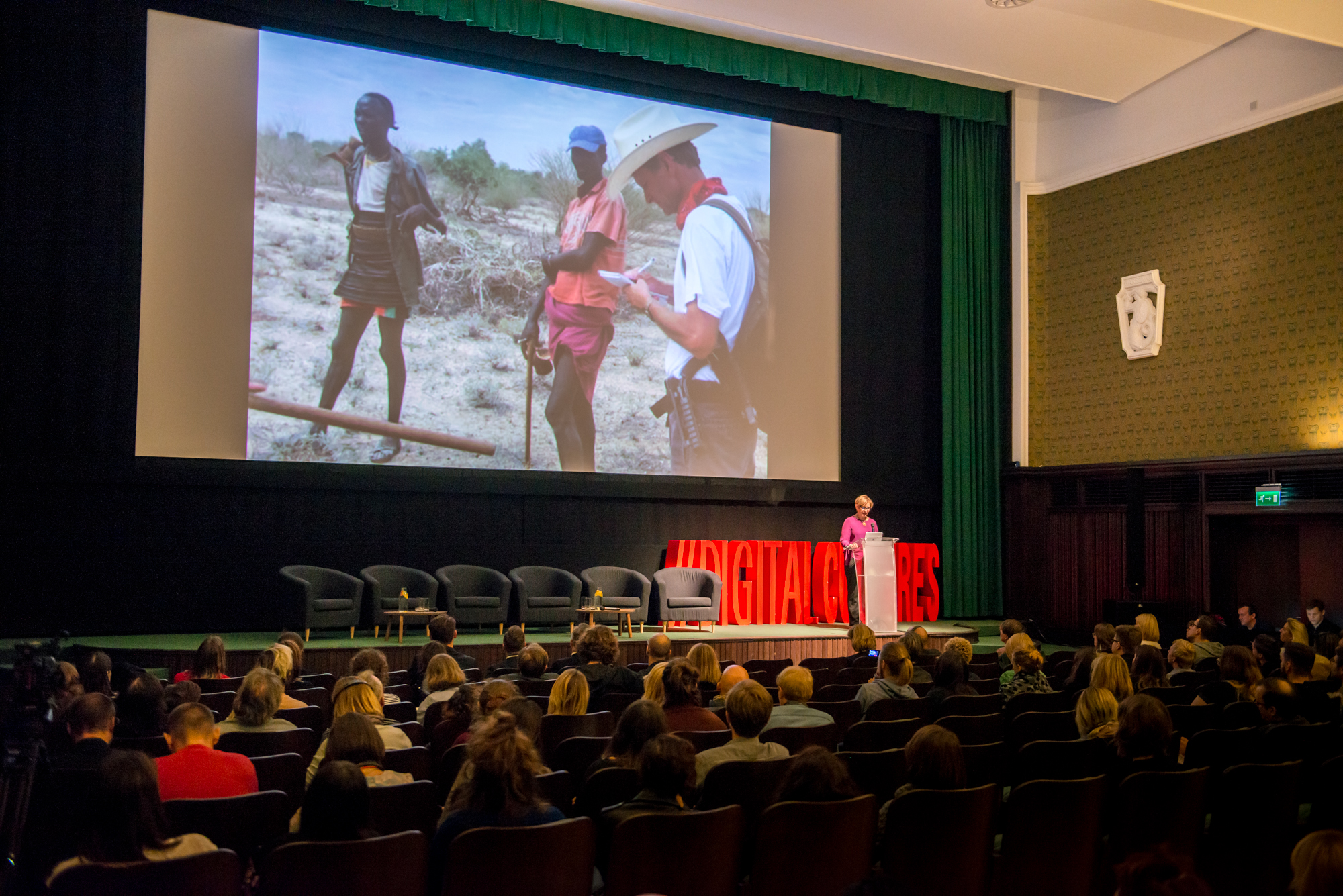
Second edition of "Digital Cultures" conference organized by Adam Mickiewicz Institute

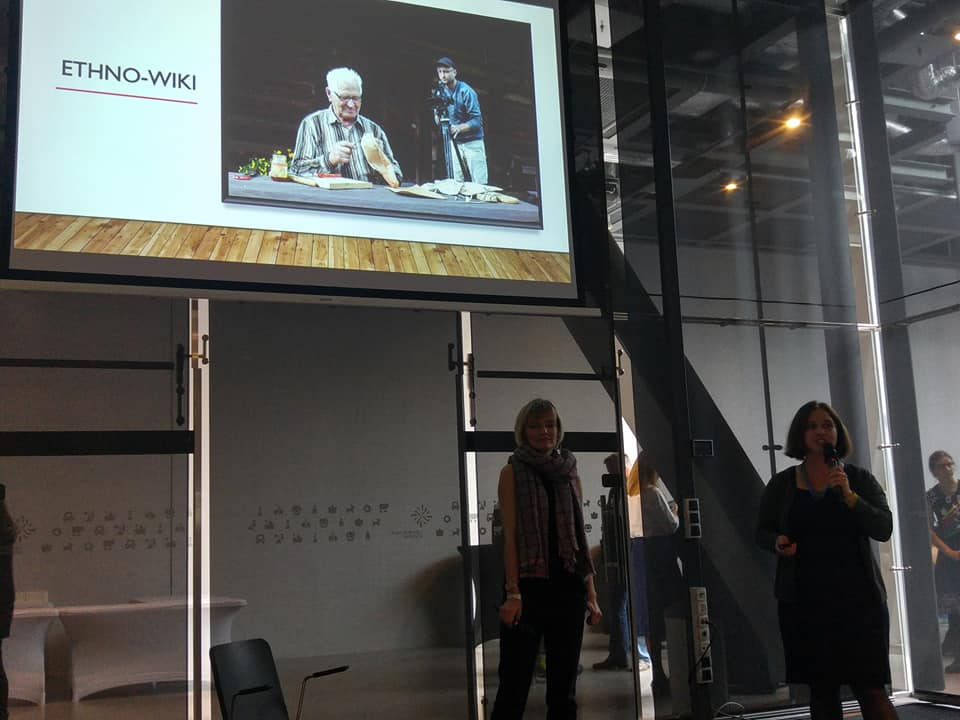
First edition of "Digital Cultures" conference

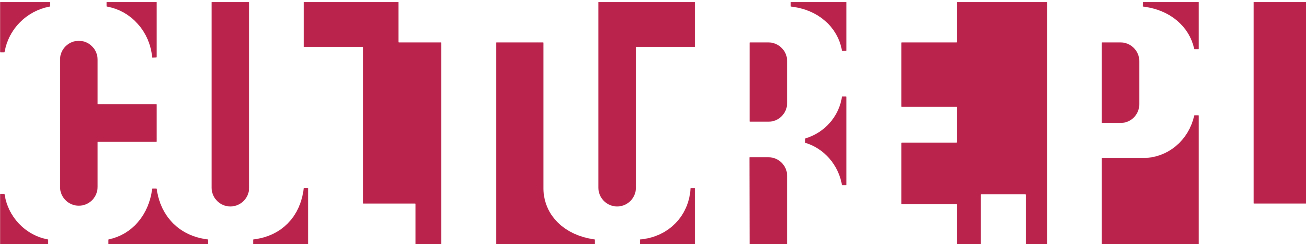
Culture.pl portal is maintained by the Institute

== See also ==
- Polish Institute
