= Culture.pl =

Web portal devoted to Polish culture founded by the Adam Mickiewicz Institute

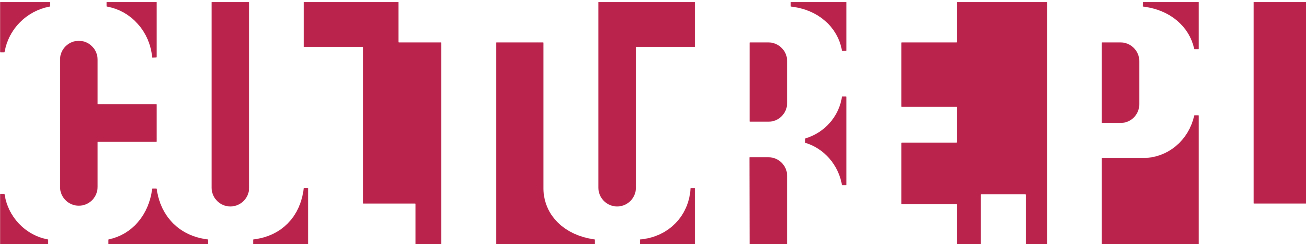
- Website type: Web portal
- Available in: English, Russian, Ukrainian, Korean, Japanese, Chinese, Polish
- Owner: Adam Mickiewicz Institute
- Founder: Andrzej Lubomirski
- Editor: Marcin Pieszczyk
- Website: culture.pl
- Launched: March 2001
- ISSN: 1734-0624

Culture.pl is a large Polish multilingual project and web portal devoted to Polish culture. It was founded by the Adam Mickiewicz Institute in March 2001. The project promotes the work of Polish artists around the world and is a popular information database on all artistic aspects of Polish culture. Originally available in Polish, English and Russian, it is now also available in Ukrainian, Korean, Japanese and Chinese.

== Structure ==
As well as acting as a database and magazine on Polish culture, the site promotes cultural events organised by its parent organisation the Adam Mickiewicz Institute. According to its website, as of 2015 Culture.pl has around 38,000 articles (8,000 of which are in English) shared across categories including Music, Visual Arts, Film, Theatre, Dance, Language & Literature, Comics, Heritage, Architecture, Photography, and Design. While a large part of the site is on Polish artists and their works, there is also information on around 700 cultural institutions such as museums, galleries, philharmonic halls, theatres and art schools. Many articles are written in English and specifically aimed at international audiences.

The portal was founded in March 2001. The project was initially conceived and designed by Andrzej Lubomirski, who also acted as editor-in-chief until 2008. Subsequent editors-in-chief included Monika Rencławowicz (2008–2009), Elżbieta Sawicka (2009–2012) and Weronika Kostyrko (2012–2016). The site went on to expand its offering with multimedia guides and podcasts.

In June 2016, Culture.pl released four multimedia guides developed with Bright Media called A Foreigner's Guide to Polish Culture, covering the fields of cinema, electronic music and photography, as well as the Polish alphabet.

In August 2017, Culture.pl's English section released their first podcast, called Stories From The Eastern West. The podcast is advertised as 'little-known histories from Central and Eastern Europe that changed our world'. In August 2019, the team released a mini-series called The Final Curtain about the collapse of the Eastern Bloc.

In December 2018, Culture.pl's English section produced its first book Quarks, Elephants & Pierogi: Poland in 100 Words, an expansion and repurposing of its old online series Poland Word by Word to commemorate the 100th anniversary of Poland regaining independence. The book was illustrated by artist Magdalena Burdzyńska, and written by Mikołaj Gliński, Matthew Davies and Adam Żuławski.

In February 2019, Culture.pl released Where Is Poland?, an expansive multimedia guide to how Polish culture carried on during the 123 years of Partitions Era.

Also in February 2019, Culture.pl released Unseen, their first geo-located soundwalk. The first season is designed for use with the Echoes app while walking around the Palace of Culture and Science in Warsaw.

== Reception ==
In 2010, the monthly magazine Press named Culture.pl the best Polish-language cultural portal on the Internet.

In 2015, the portal won the 'Culture on the Net' category in TVP Kultura's annual 'Guarantee of Culture' awards. The prizes recognise the most interesting and important Polish cultural stars of the year.

In 2019, the book Quarks, Elephants & Pierogi: Poland in 100 Words, published by Culture.pl, won the annual Most Beutiful Books of the Year Award in the reference works category, organised by the Polish Book Publishers Association.
