= Mokotowska Street, Warsaw =

Street in central Warsaw, Poland

Mokotowska
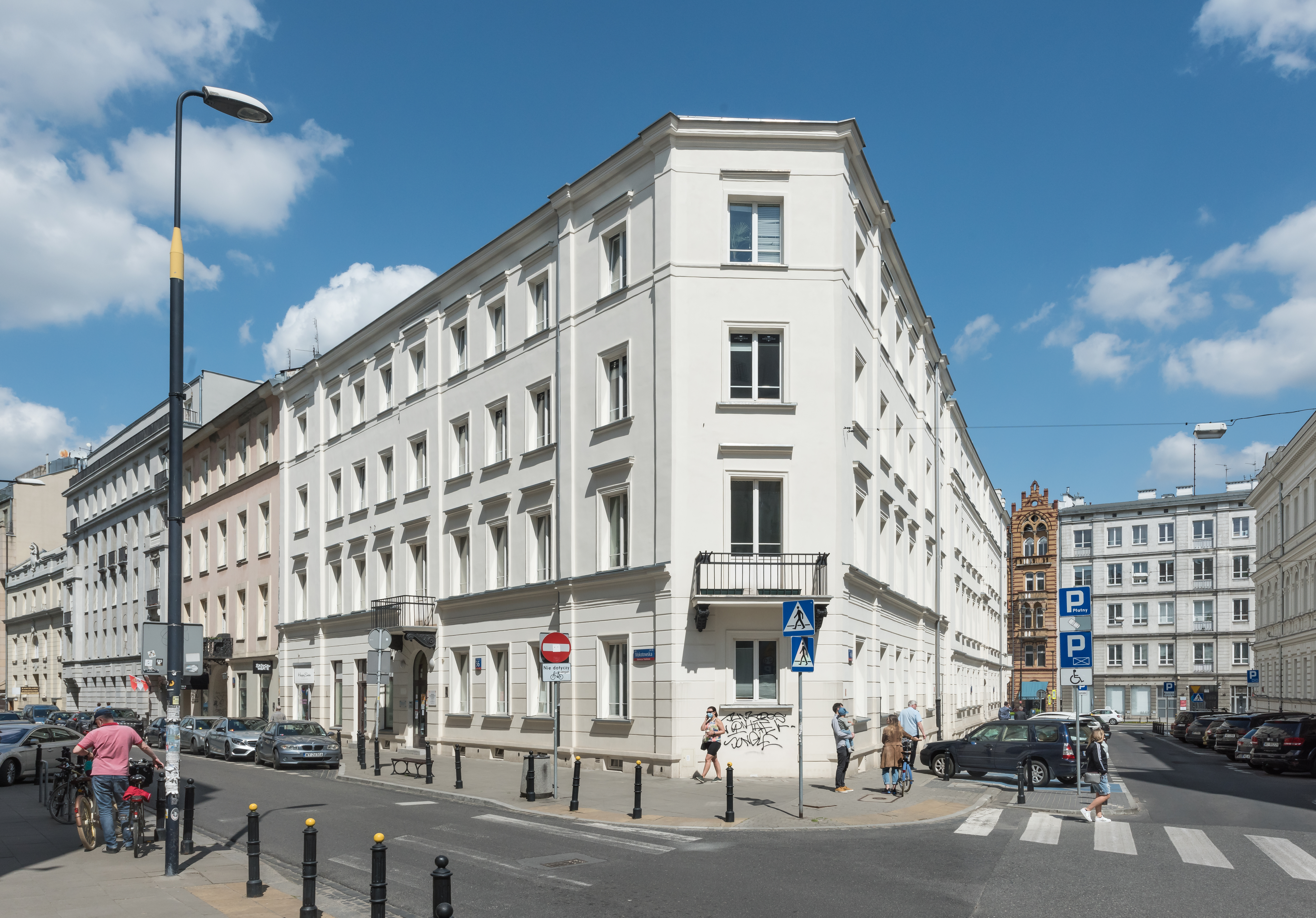
- Intersection of Mokotowska (left) and Wilcza (right)
- Interactive map of Mokotowska
- Type: Street
- Length: 1.3 kilometres (0.81 mi)
- Location: Downtown, Warsaw, Poland
- Coordinates: 52°13′21″N 21°1′11″E
- Major junctions: From north to south: Triple Cross Square and Hoża Street, Wilcza Street, Piękna Street, Krucza Street, Chopin Street, Koszykowa Street, Saviour Square, Jaworzyńska Street and Armii Ludowej Avenue

Construction
- Inauguration: 1770 (as Mokotowska)

Other
- Known for: historic tenements

Mokotowska (Polish: ulica Mokotowska) is a street situated in the Southern Downtown (Śródmieście Południowe) of Warsaw, Poland.

It is 1.3 kilometres (0.81 mi) long and runs south from Triple Cross Square to Armii Ludowej Avenue.

Due to its preserved prewar appearance, in 1965 the street was inscribed in the Registry of Polish Cultural Property.

== Etymology ==
The name of the street is directly derived from the neighbourhood of Mokotów, to which it leads. The literal translation into English is 'Mokotów Street' or the 'Street to Mokotów', with the Polish feminine suffix -owska added to denote possession or relation.

== History ==
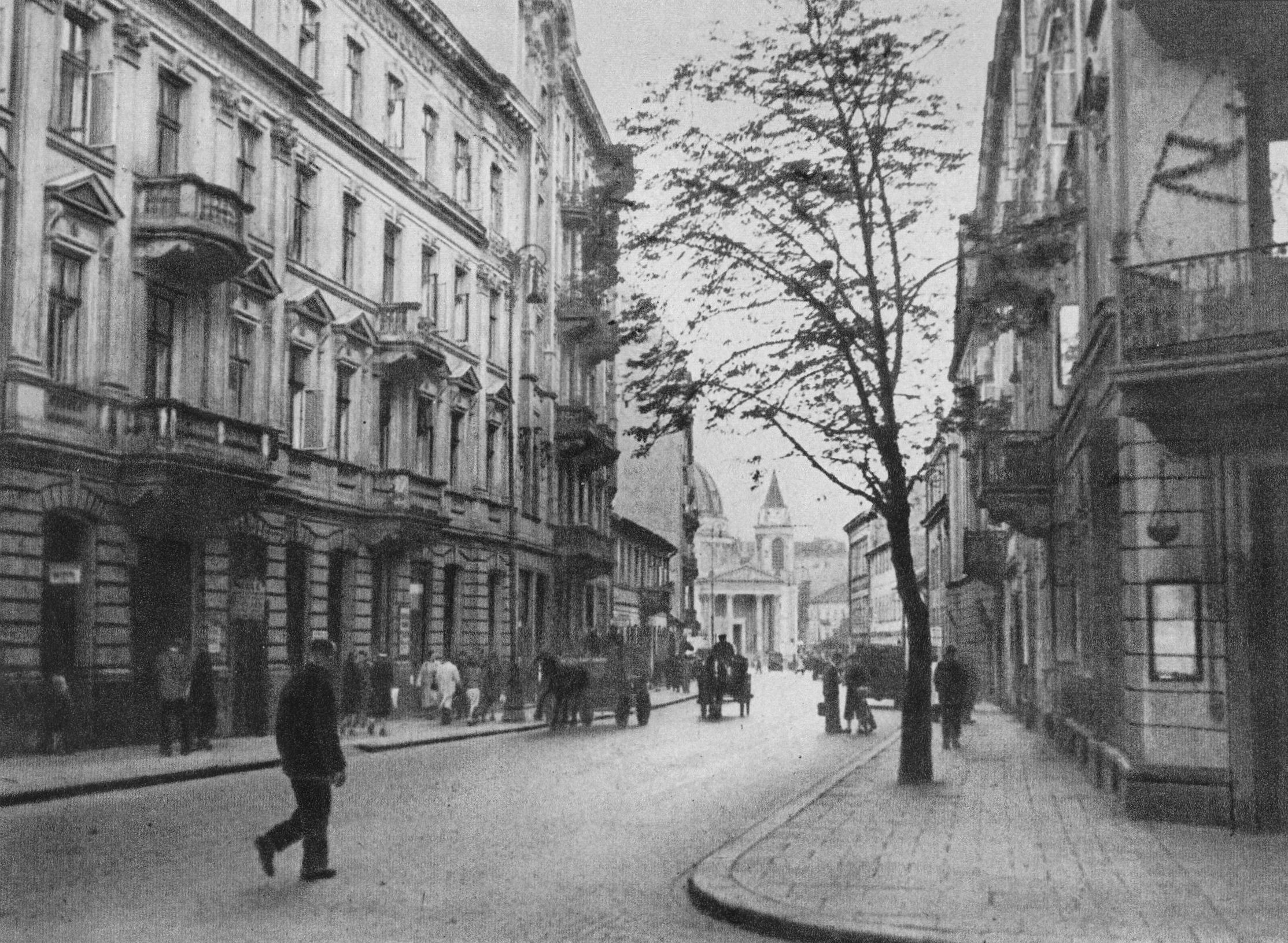
View of Mokotowska before 1939.

The present-day street was once the site of a route which connected the then villages of Warsaw and Mokotowo (now spelled Mokotów) since at least the 14th century.

The mid-late 18th century saw dramatic changes to the urban layout of Warsaw, and old trails or dirt roads beyond core areas were modernised, mapped and named. Records show that Mokotowska was officially inaugurated in 1770, with rows of trees planted along its sides. Prior to 1784, the number of dwellings was relatively scarce. The section between Triple Cross Square and Wilcza was occupied by fifteen timber houses, two small palatial mansions and three tenements, however, the southern end comprised vegetable gardens, orchards, and empty allotments. One of the mansions belonged to Franciszek Ryx, a Flemish-born theatre director and valet to Stanislaus Augustus, the last King of Poland.

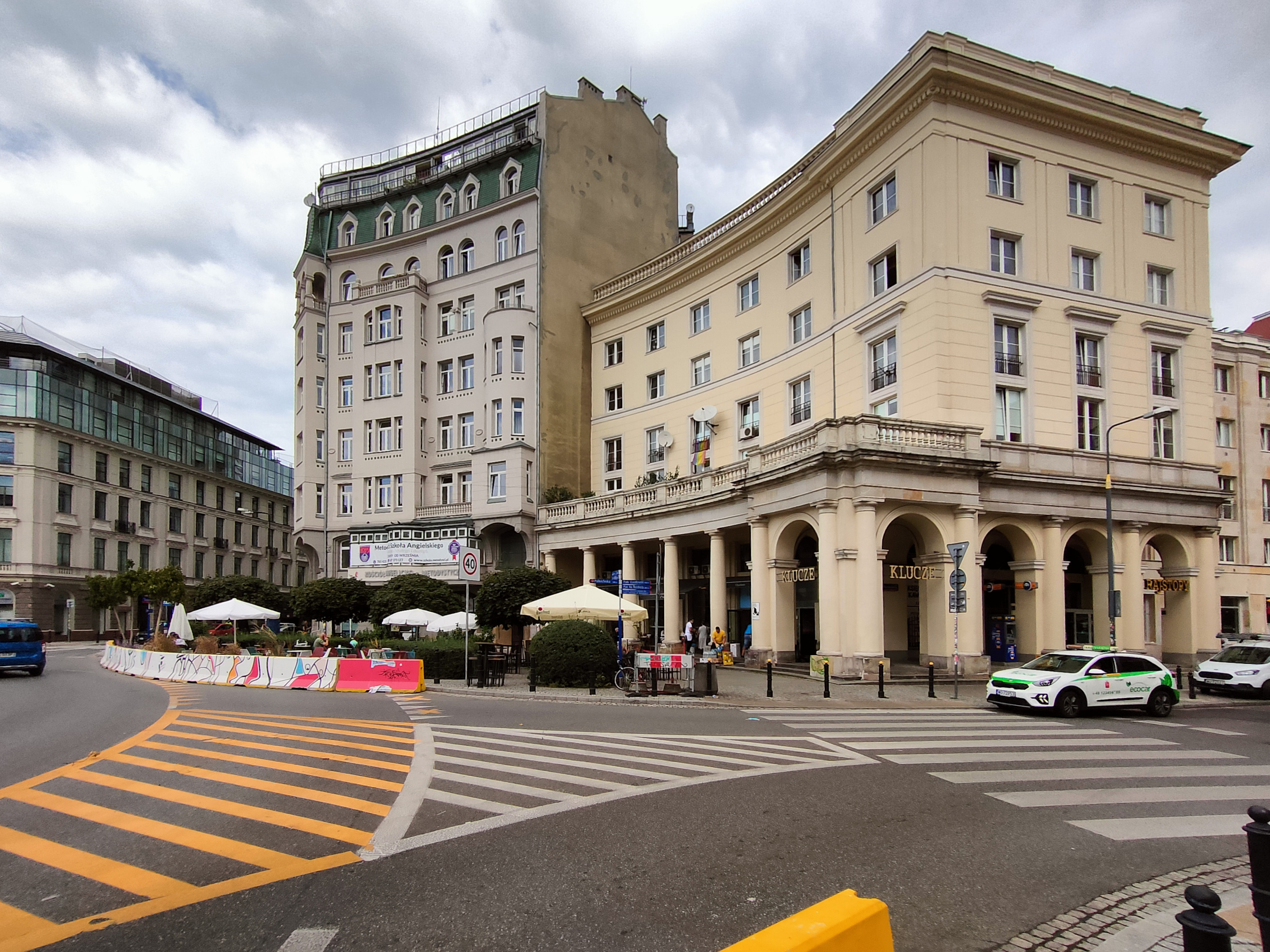
Saviour Square and the junction with Mokotowska (centre-left); the central tenement was the tallest in Warsaw at the time of its completion in 1910.

When Warsaw became part of Congress Poland, the number of brick dwellings increased; in 1829, an inn was constructed where the Church of the Holiest Saviour now stands and by the 1820s Mokotowska was also paved with cobblestones in an attempt to improve mobility. However, the streetscape remained largely provincial and unchanged until 1882, when grandiose and elaborately decorated tenements began to be erected. Some of the newer flats were constructed in the Art Nouveau style, notably Mokotowska 12 which was the tallest apartment building in the city upon its completion in 1910. It has also served as the seat and chapel of the Polish Methodist Church. Several of the smaller residences were remodelled, notably the Sugar Palace which was transformed from a mere cottage into a Rococo Revival château, enclosed by a courtyard.

The building at Mokotowska 48 dating to 1860 hosted two important Polish personalities of the 19th century – writer Józef Ignacy Kraszewski and naturalist Tytus Chałubiński.

In around 1915, the rough and obsolete cobblestone surface was replaced with new granite paving stones.

During the Warsaw Uprising of 1944, the street's vicinity was defended from the Germans by the Home Army's Ruczaj Battalion. Although Mokotowska was not spared from considerable damage and partial destruction in the war, much of its historic character remained and it hosts some of the finest examples of pre-war architecture in Warsaw, along with the intersecting Wilcza Street and other areas of South Downtown. Threatened by new urban planning under the Polish People's Republic, it was listed in the Registry of Cultural Property as a heritage place in 1965 to protect it from further alterations. Nonetheless, many structures were simplified and stripped of their rich façade moldings, cartouches and ornaments after the war. Several new buildings built in the socialist realist style were also inspired by older tenements.

== See also ==
- Marszałkowska
- Ujazdów Avenue, Warsaw
- History of Warsaw
