= Church of the Most Holy Saviour, Warsaw =

Roman Catholic church in Poland

Church of the Most Holy Saviour Kościół Najświętszego Zbawiciela (in Polish)
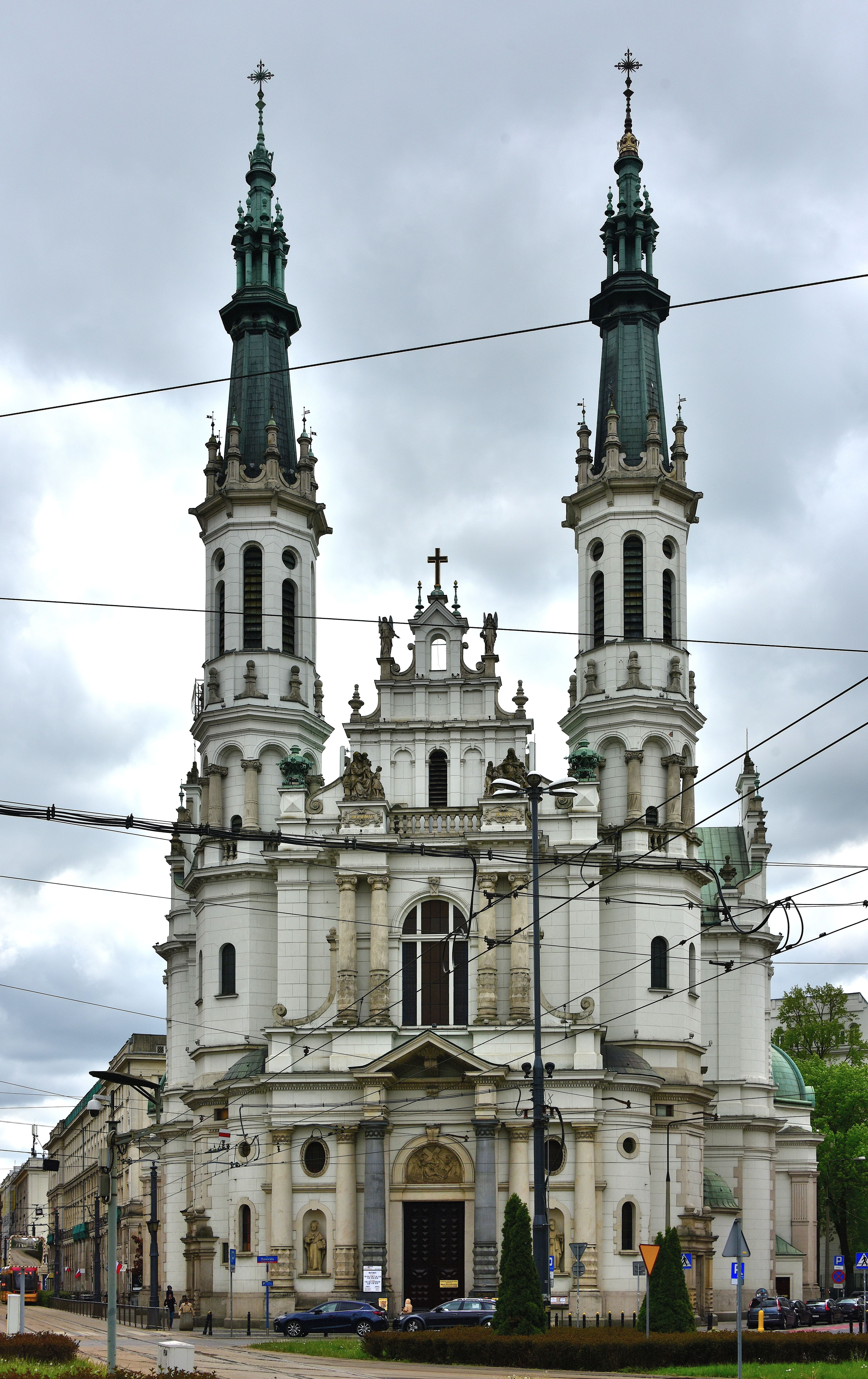
- Church of the Most Holy Saviour in 2019

General information
- Architectural style: Polish Renaissance, Polish Baroque
- Location: Warsaw, Poland
- Coordinates: 52°13′9″N 21°1′4″E
- Construction started: 1901
- Completed: 1927
- Demolished: 1944

Design and construction
- Architects: Józef Pius Dziekoński, Ludwik Panczakiewicz, Władysław Żychlewicz

Church of the Most Holy Saviour (Polish: Kościół Najświętszego Zbawiciela) is a Roman Catholic parish church in the Śródmieście district of Warsaw, Poland, on Saviour Square.

== History ==
The origins of the church date back to the end of the 19th century. A growing number of citizens of the Śródmieście Południowe and Ujazdów districts of Warsaw wanted to commemorate the upcoming year 1900. They were supported by the Archbishop Wincenty Popiel. In 1900 the grounds between the Marszałkowska and Mokotowska Streets were bought, and construction began the following year. In 1903 the church was partially opened to believers and four years later became fully operational. In 1927 it was ceremonially consecrated by Bishop Stanisław Gall.

During World War II the building was heavily damaged. In 1939 during the Nazi bombing of Warsaw, missiles destroyed the western tower and the roof. Nazis also arrested the church rector, priest Marceli Nowakowski, who was later executed in the Sejm gardens in February 1940. After the failure of the Warsaw Uprising of 1944, Germans detonated explosives in the church, heavily damaging the whole building. After the war quick restoration work was conducted and in 1948, the building was again opened to worshippers. However, the communist authorities only allowed the reconstruction of the spires in 1955. During the construction of the Marszałkowska Apartments District, they also changed the course of the Marszałkowska Street and built the MDM Hotel at the Constitution Square in order to hide the church from the panorama of the city.

The building is a three-nave basilica church with a dome over the crossing of the naves. The main facade, facing the square, features two slim towers and sculptures of Saints Peter and Paul.

== See also ==
- St. Florian's Cathedral
