= Yitzchak Lowy =

Polish stage actor (1887–1942)

Yitzchak Lowy (1887–1942), also known as Yitskhok Levi, Jizchak Löwy, Jacques Levy, Djak Levi, was a Polish Yiddish theater actor.

== Early life; career ==
Lowy was born in Warsaw, Poland. In 1907, he joined a Yiddish theater troupe and toured Europe. From October 1911 through 1912, the troupe stayed in Prague, where Lowy became good friends with Austrian-Czech writer Franz Kafka.

== Death ==
From the Warsaw Ghetto, it is likely that he was deported in the summer of 1942 and then murdered in the Treblinka extermination camp.

== See also ==
- List of people from Warsaw
- List of Polish actors
