= List of people from Warsaw =

The following is a list of notable people who were born, studied, lived or died in Warsaw.

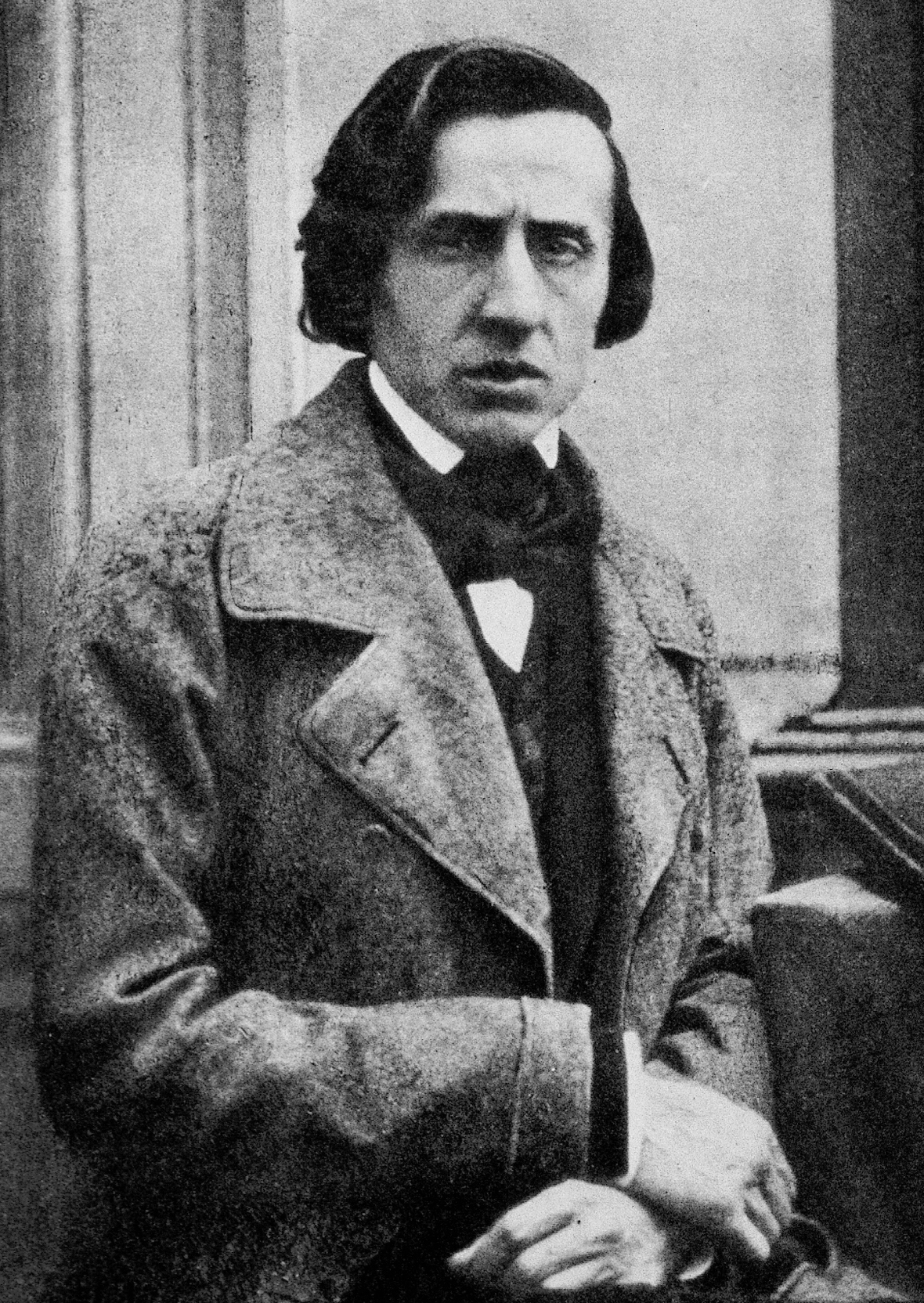
Frédéric Chopin

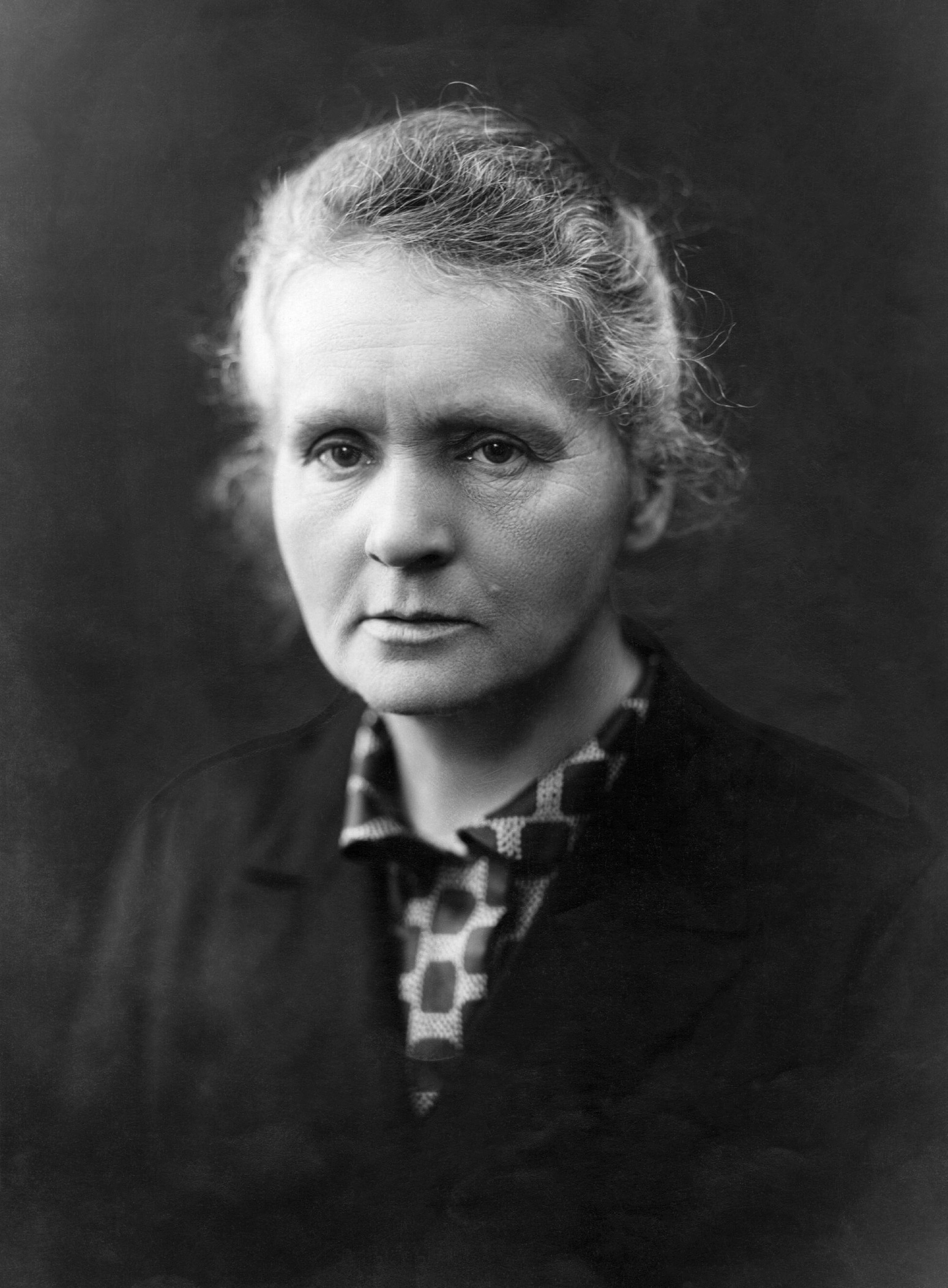
Marie Skłodowska-Curie

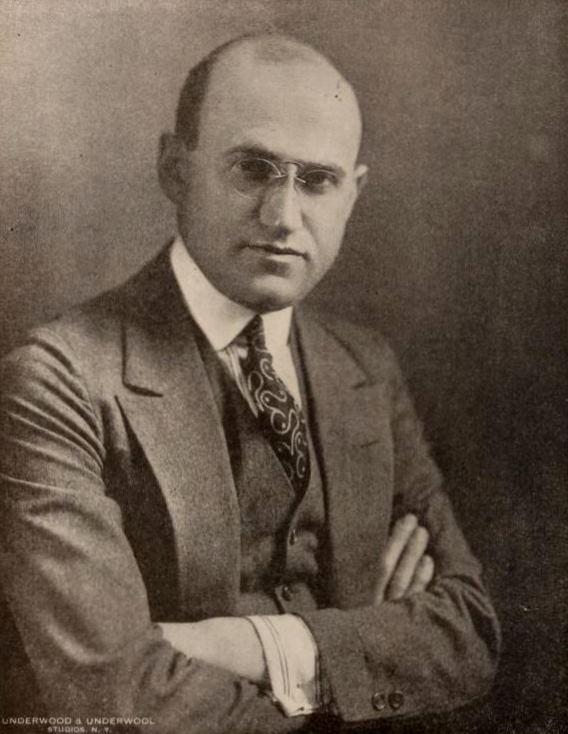
Samuel Goldwyn

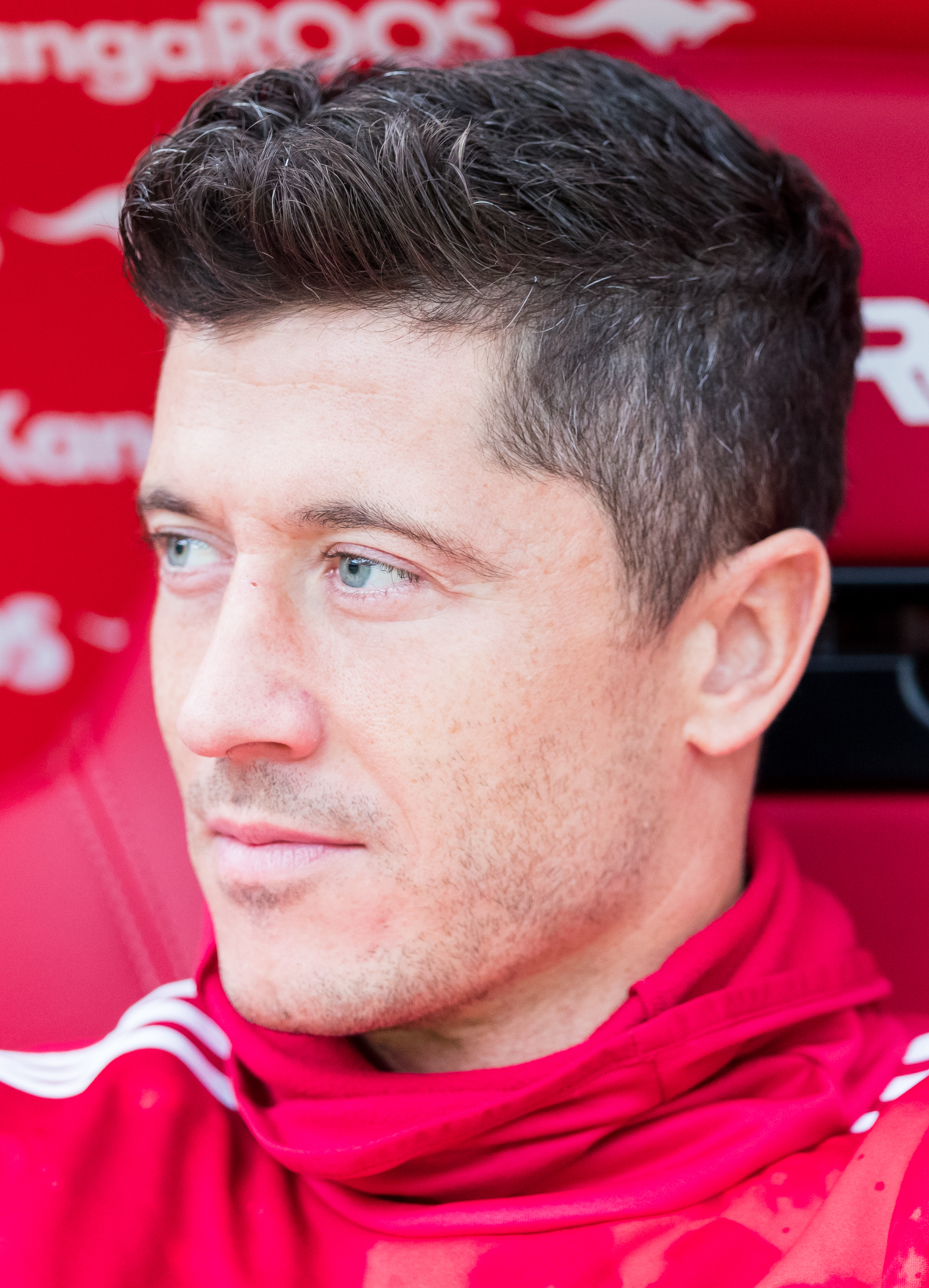
Robert Lewandowski

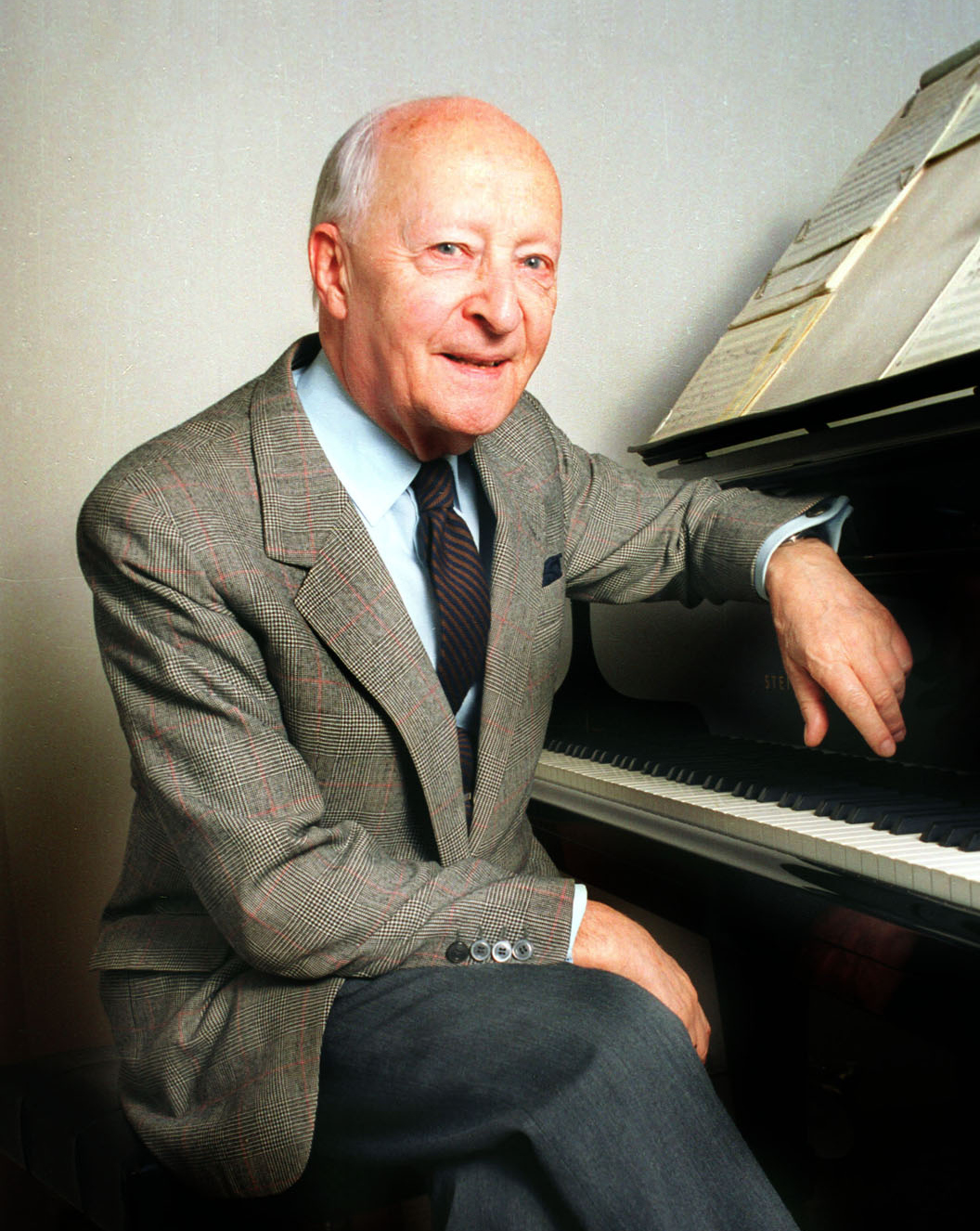
Witold Lutosławski

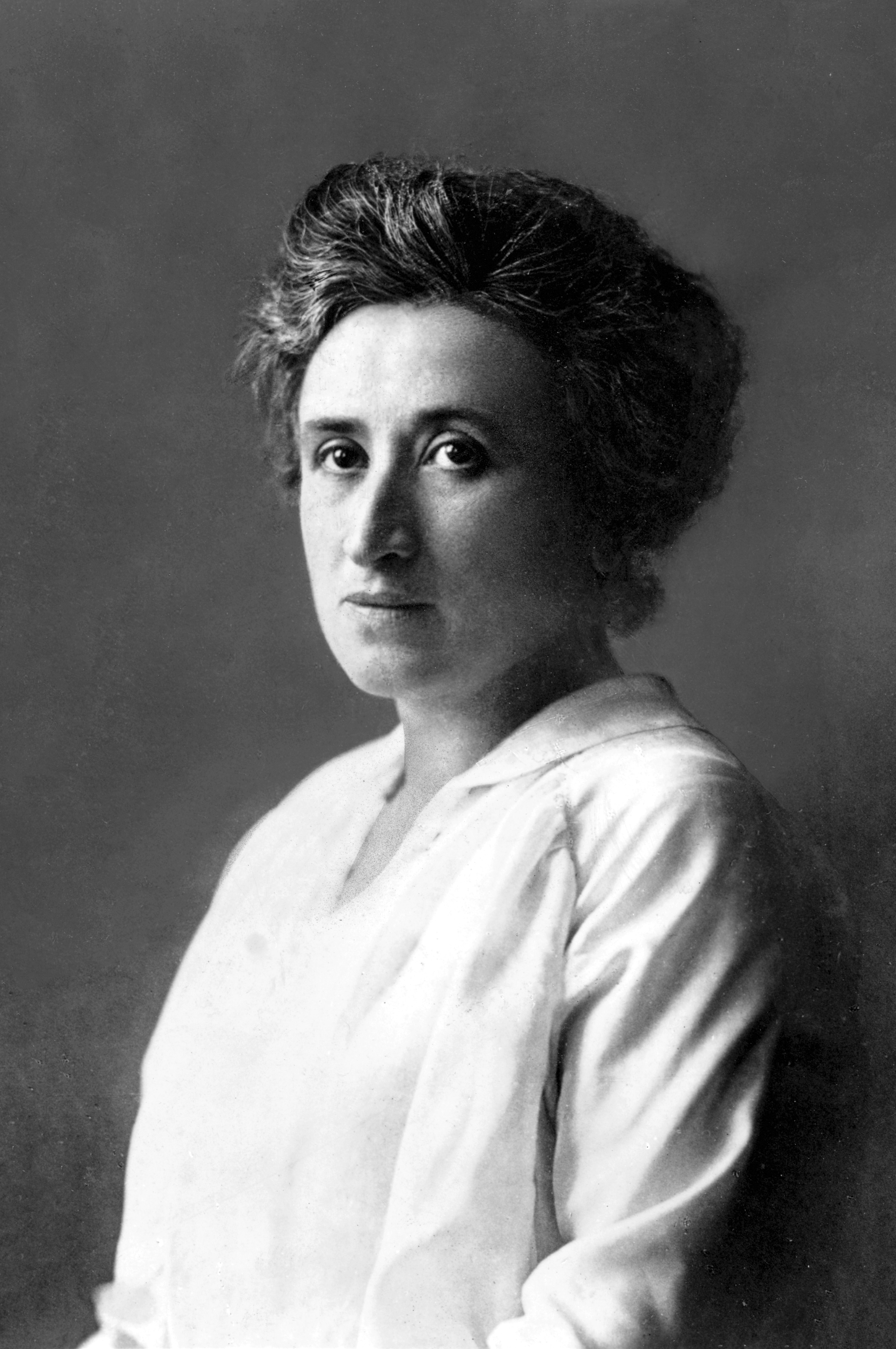
Rosa Luxemburg

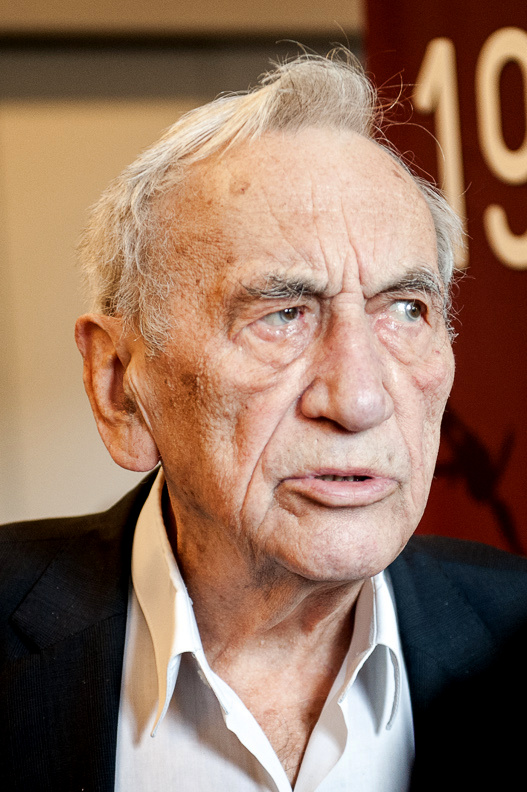
Tadeusz Mazowiecki

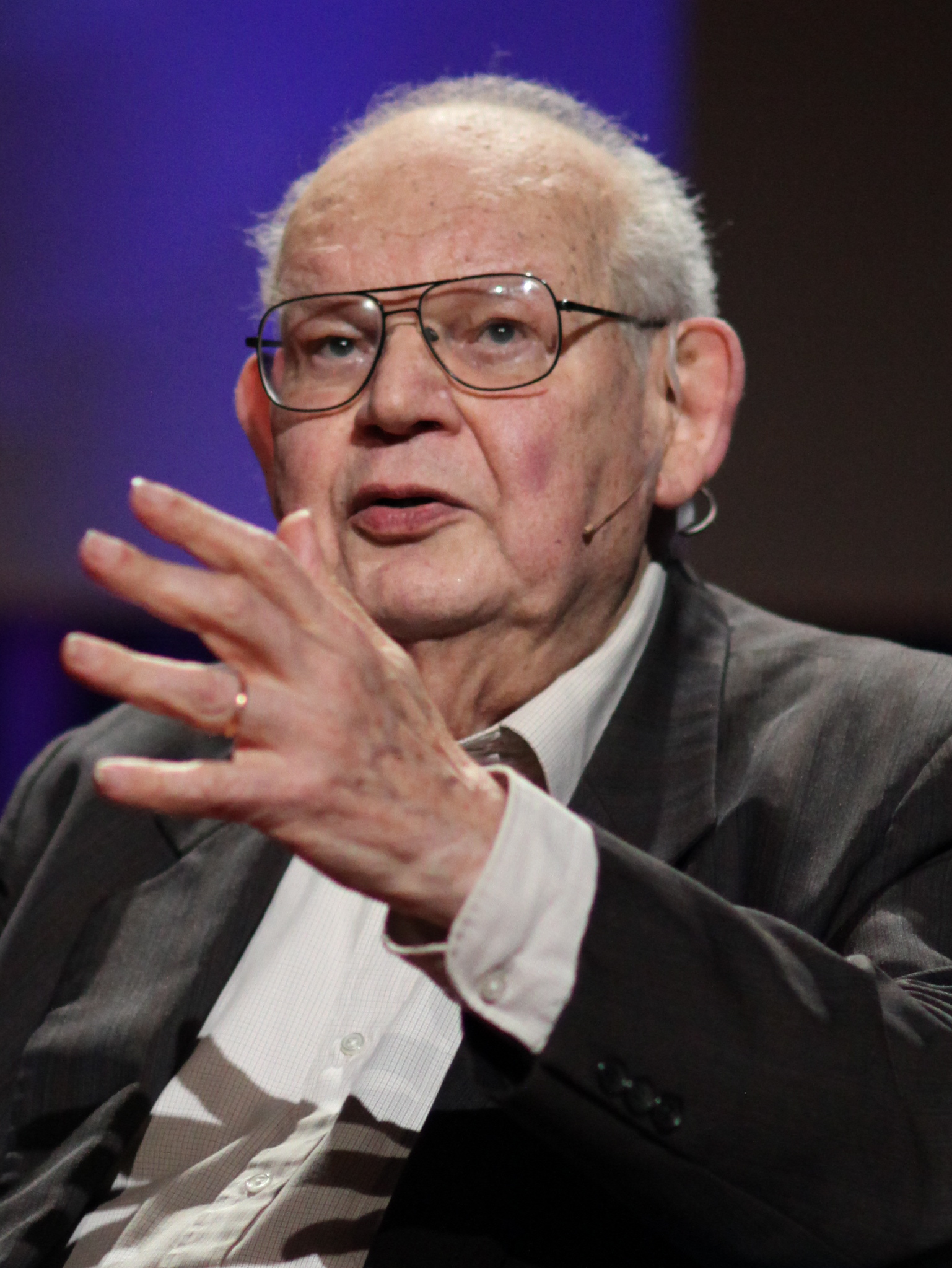
Benoit Mandelbrot

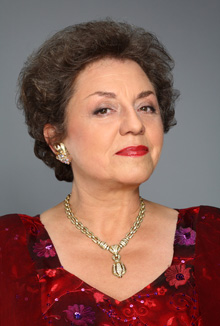
Ewa Podleś

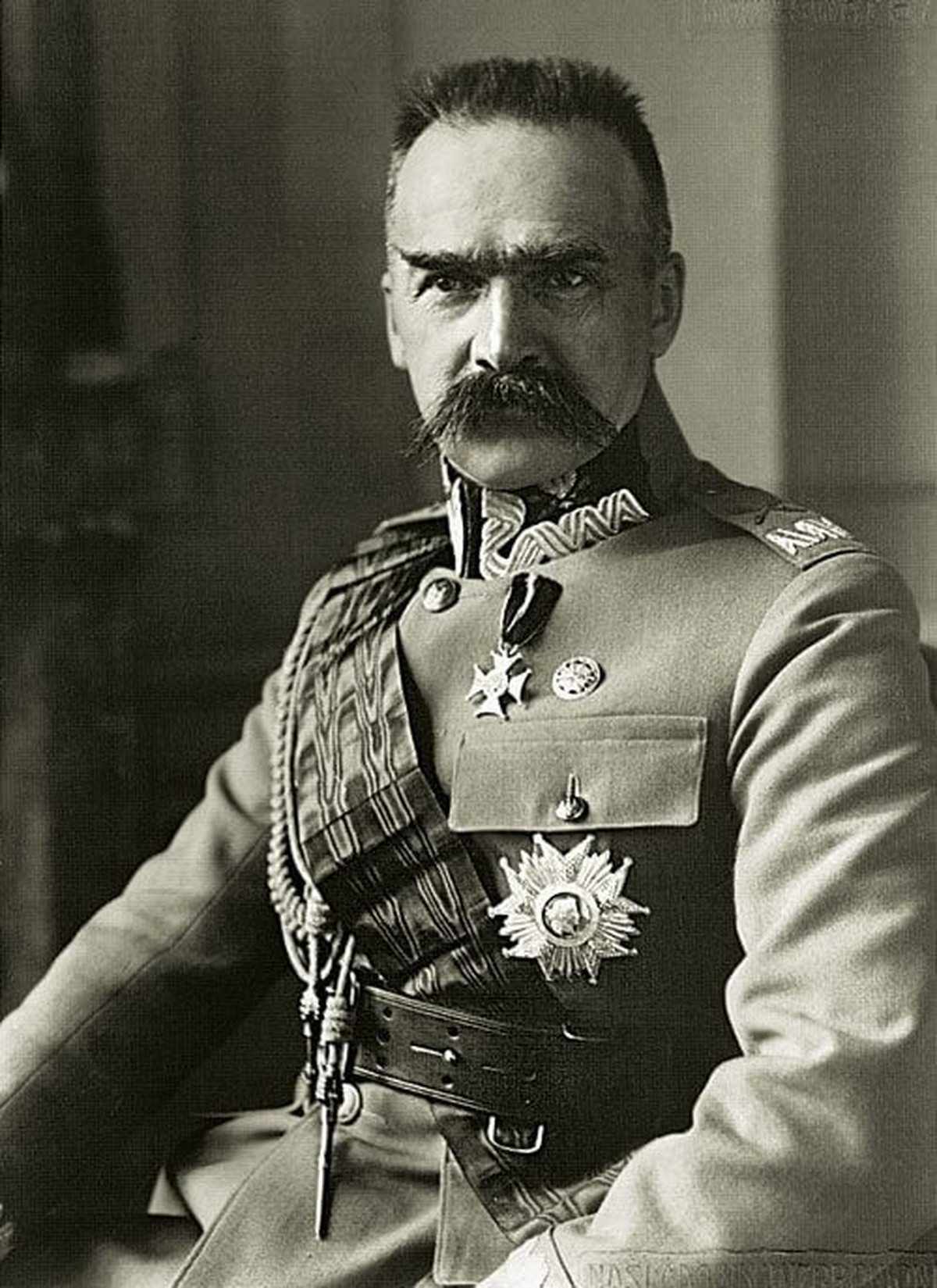
Józef Piłsudski

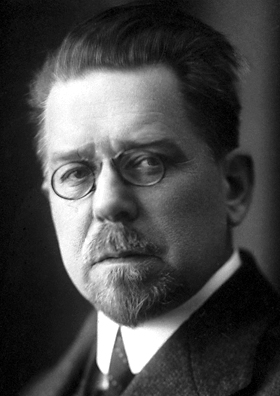
Władysław Reymont

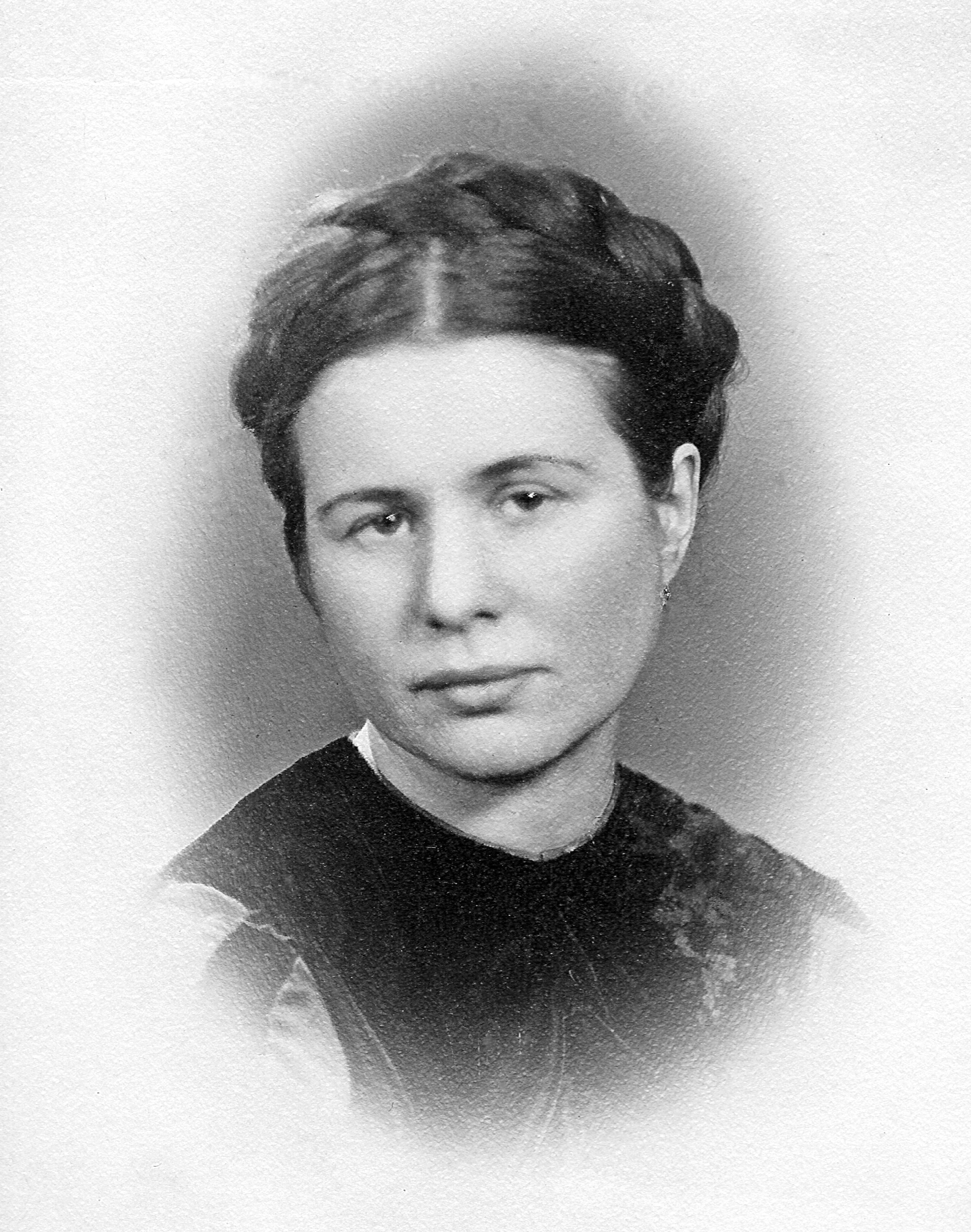
Irena Sendler

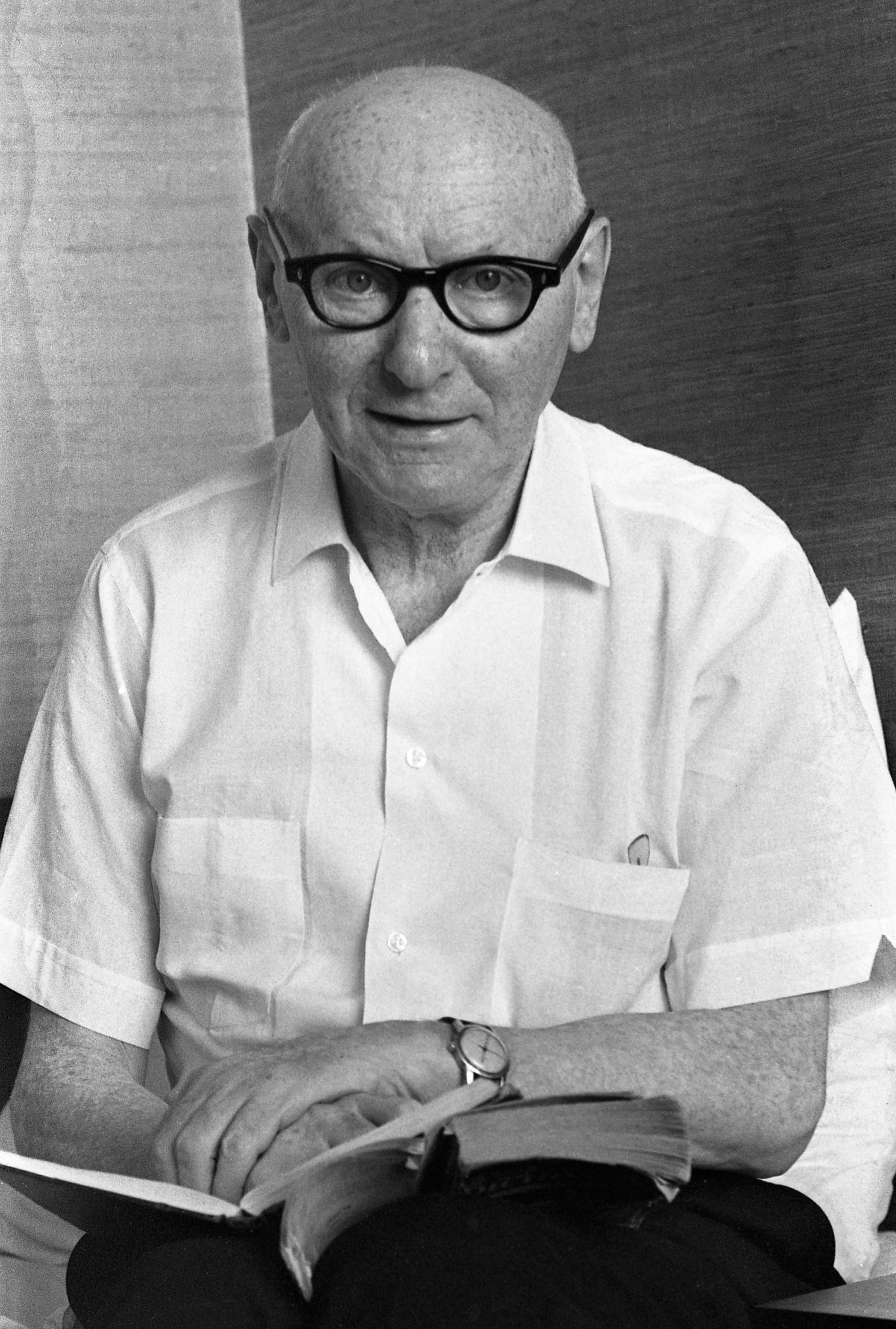
Isaac Bashevis Singer

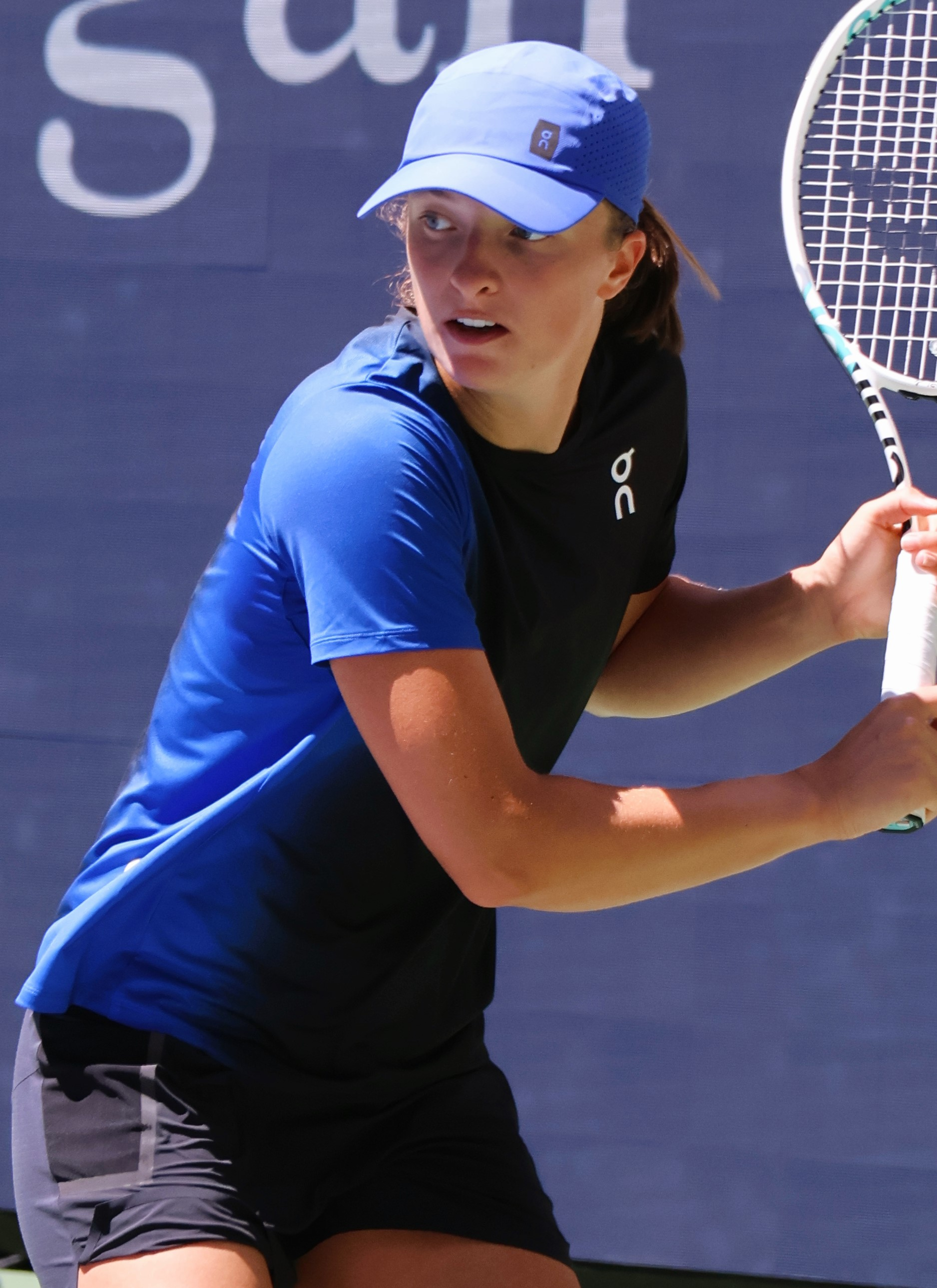
Iga Świątek

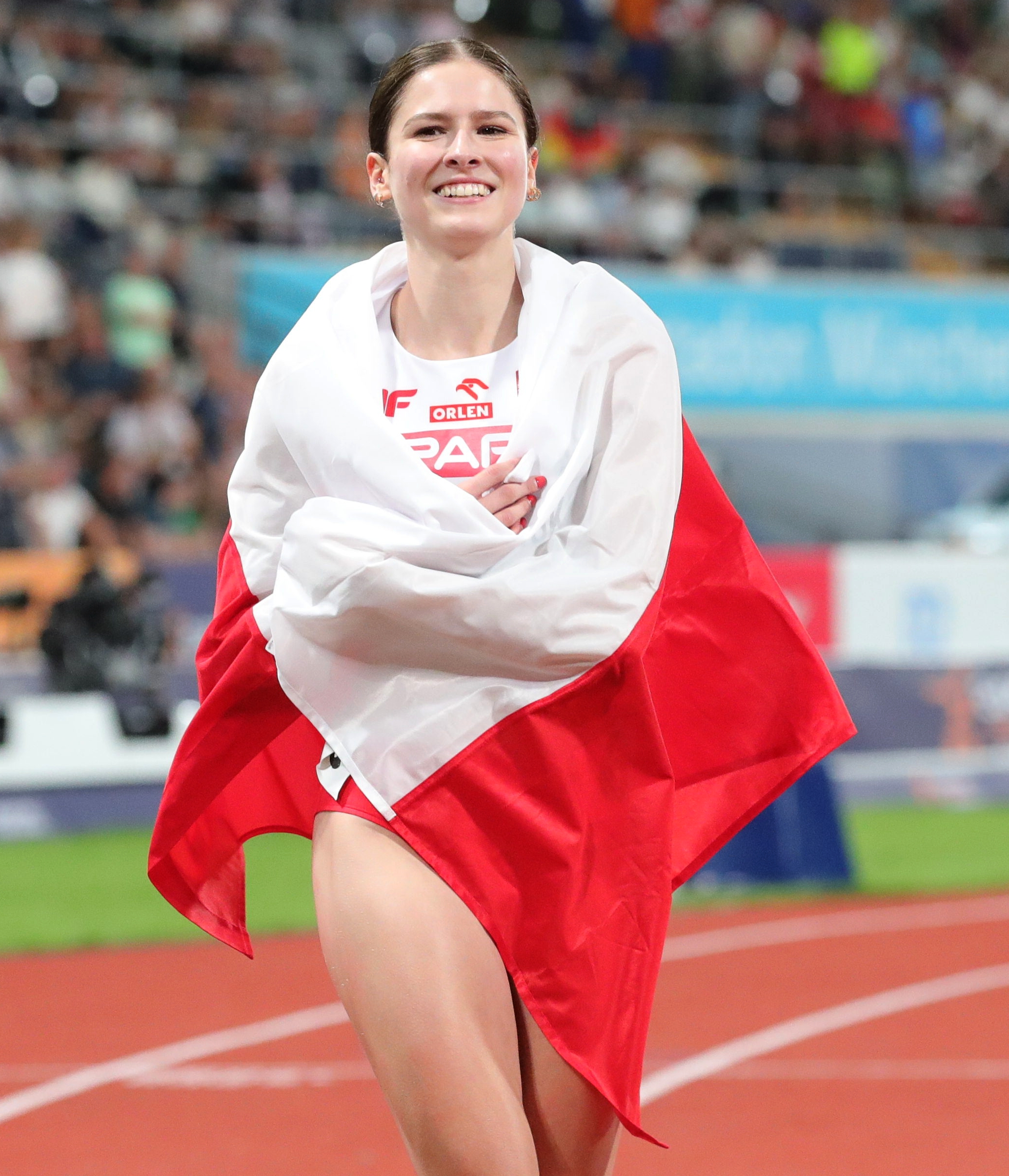
Pia Skrzyszowska

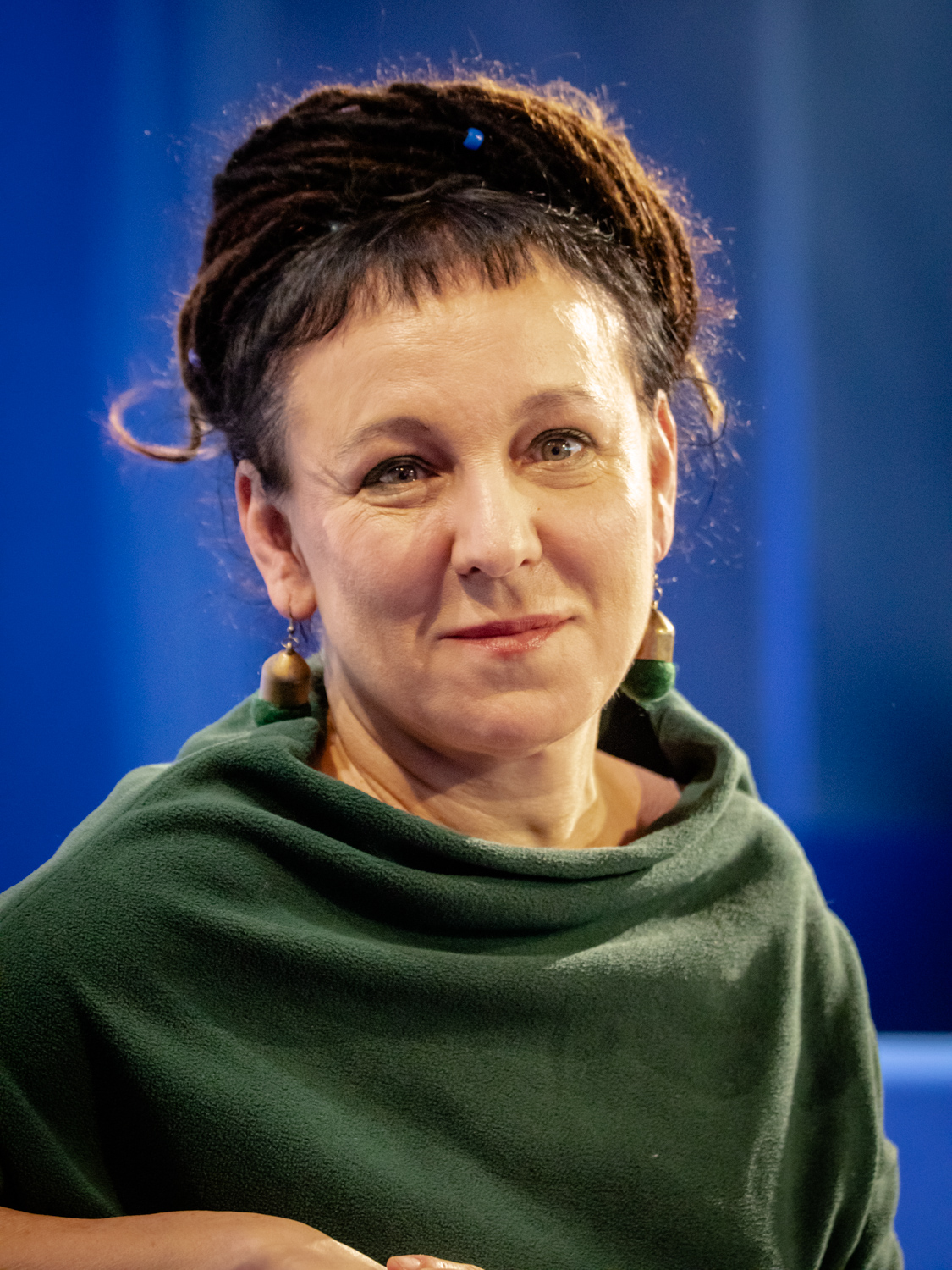
Olga Tokarczuk

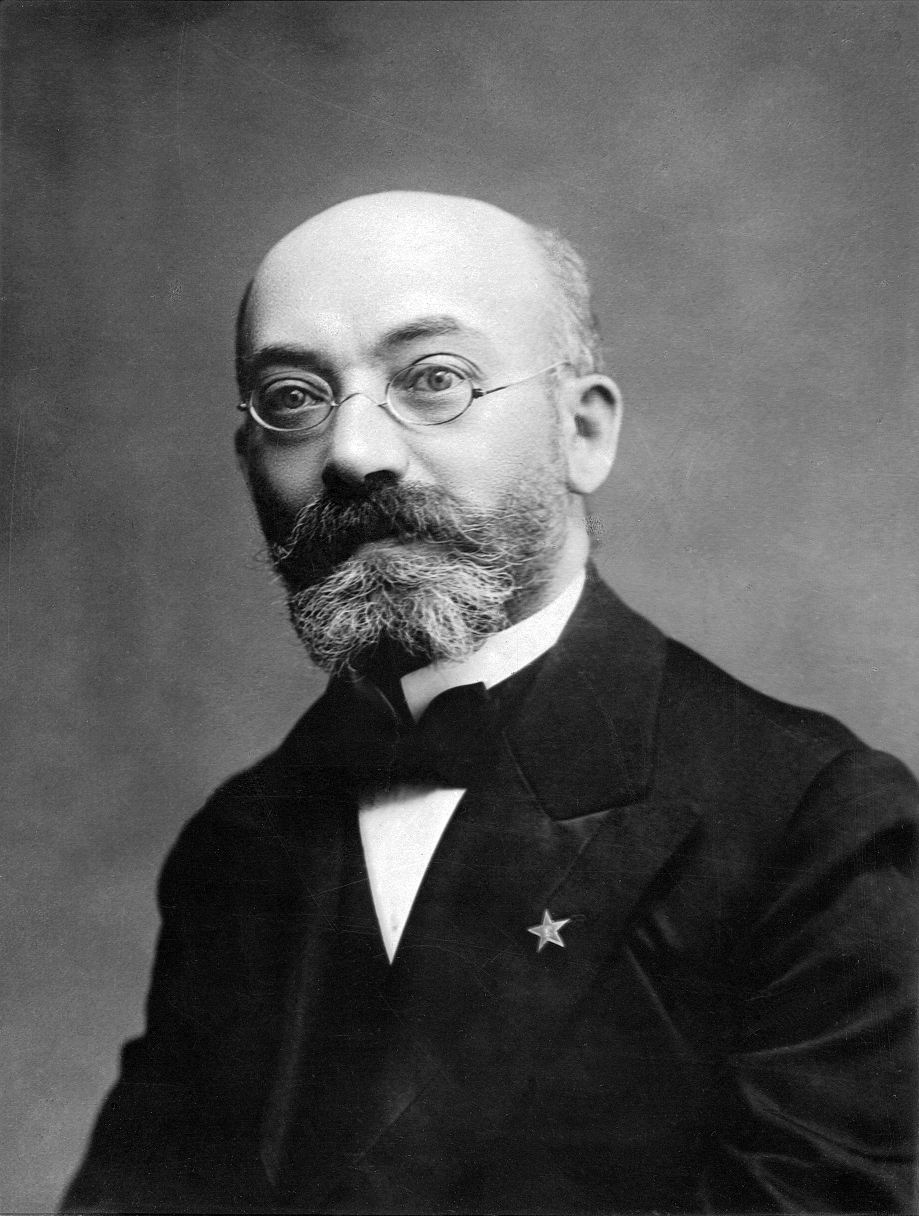
L.L. Zamenhof

== Art and literature ==
- Nathan Alterman (1910–1970), Israeli poet, playwright, journalist, and translator, born in Warsaw
- Paweł Althamer (born 1967), contemporary sculptor, performer and video artist, born and lives in Warsaw, studied at the Warsaw Academy of Fine Arts
- Concordia Antarova (1886–1959), contralto singer, born in Warsaw
- Mirosław Bałka (born 1958), contemporary sculptor and video artist, born live in Warsaw, studied at the Warsaw Academy of Fine Arts
- Bernardo Bellotto (1721–1780), landscape painter, lived and died in Warsaw
- Mikalojus Konstantinas Čiurlionis (1875–1911), Lithuanian composer and painter, studied at the Warsaw Academy of Fine Arts and at the Warsaw Conservatory
- Frédéric Chopin (1810–1849), composer and pianist of the Romantic period, lived in Warsaw and studied at the Warsaw Conservatory
- Xawery Dunikowski (1875–1964), sculptor, professor of the Warsaw Academy of Fine Arts
- Józef Pius Dziekoński (1844–1924), architect, dean of the Architecture Department at the Warsaw University of Technology
- Wojciech Fangor (1922–2015), painter, graphic artist, sculptor, born and lived in Warsaw, studied at the Warsaw Academy of Fine Arts
- Michel Foucault (1926–1984), French philosopher, in the years 1958–1959 first director of the University of Warsaw's Centre Français
- Tylman van Gameren (1632–c. 1706), Dutch-Polish architect, lived in Warsaw
- Wojciech Gerson (1831–1901), painter, born and lived in Warsaw, studied at the Warsaw Academy of Fine Arts
- Aleksander Gierymski (1850–1901), painter, born in Warsaw
- Maksymilian Gierymski (1846–1874), painter, born in Warsaw
- Samuel Goldwyn (1879 or 1882–1974), American film producer, born in Warsaw
- Witold Gombrowicz (1904–1969), writer and dramatist, lived in Warsaw and studied at the University of Warsaw
- Zbigniew Herbert (1924–1998), poet, essayist, drama writer and moralist, lived in Warsaw and studied at the University of Warsaw
- Agnieszka Holland (born 1948), director and screenwriter, born in Warsaw
- Jarosław Iwaszkiewicz (1894–1980), writer, poet, essayist, dramatist and translator, lived in Warsaw
- Johann Christian Kammsetzer (1753–1795), Saxon-Polish architect, lived in Warsaw
- Jan Kiepura (1902–1966), singer and actor, studied at the University of Warsaw
- Stefan Kuryłowicz (1949–2011), architect, born and lived in Warsaw and studied at the Warsaw University of Technology
- Marian Lalewicz (1876–1944), architect, dean of the Architecture Department and rector at the Warsaw University of Technology
- Tamara de Lempicka (1898–1980), painter, born in Warsaw
- Witold Lutosławski (1913–1994), composer and conductor, born and lived in Warsaw, studied at the University of Warsaw
- Osip Mandelstam (1891–1938), Russian and Soviet poet, born in Warsaw
- Domenico Merlini (1730–1797), Italian-Polish architect, lived in Warsaw
- Stanisław Moniuszko (1819–1872), composer, "the father of Polish national opera", lived and stuied in Warsaw
- Pola Negri (1897–1987), stage and film actress and singer, lived and made her theatrical debut in Warsaw
- Ignacy Jan Paderewski (1860–1941), pianist, composer and Prime Minister of Poland in 1919, studied at the Warsaw Conservatory
- Paweł Pawlikowski (born 1957), director, born in Warsaw
- Isaac Leib Peretz (1852–1915), Yiddish-language writer, lived in Warsaw
- Bohdan Pniewski (1897–1965), architect, born and lived in Warsaw and studied at the Warsaw University of Technology
- Władysław Podkowiński (1866–1895), painter and illustrator, born and lived in Warsaw, studied at the Warsaw Academy of Fine Arts
- Ewa Podleś (1952–2024), contralto opera and recital singer.
- Bolesław Prus (1847–1912), novelist, lived in Warsaw and studied at the University of Warsaw
- Władysław Reymont (1867–1925), novelist and recipient of the Nobel Prize for Literature, lived in Warsaw
- Henryk Sienkiewicz (1846–1919), writer and recipient of the Nobel Prize for Literature, lived in Warsaw and studied at the University of Warsaw
- Isaac Bashevis Singer (1903–1991), Yiddish-language writer and recipient of the Nobel Prize for Literature, lived in Warsaw
- Henryk Stażewski (1894–1998), painter, representant of constructivism and geometric abstraction, born and lived in Warsaw, studied at the Warsaw Academy of Fine Arts
- Władysław Szpilman (1911–2000), pianist and classical composer, lived in Warsaw and studied at the Chopin Academy of Music
- Aleksandra Szwed (born 1990), actress, television presenter, singer, born and lives in Warsaw.
- Karol Szymanowski (1882–1937), composer and pianist, lived in Warsaw and studied at the Warsaw Conservatory
- Wacław Szymanowski (1859–1930), sculptor, born in Warsaw
- Olga Tokarczuk (born 1962), writer and recipient of the Nobel Prize for Literature, studied at the University of Warsaw
- Julian Tuwim (1894–1953), poet, studied at the University of Warsaw
- Moshe Wilensky (1910–1997), Israeli composer, lyricist, and pianist, born in Warsaw and studied at the Warsaw Conservatory
- Stanisław Ignacy Witkiewicz (1885–1939), writer, painter, philosopher, theorist, playwright, novelist, and photographer, born in Warsaw
- Szymon Bogumił Zug (1733–1807), Saxon-Polish architect, lived in Warsaw
- Adam Zdrójkowski (born 2000), actor, television presenter, born and lives in Warsaw
- Stefan Żeromski (1864–1925), novelist and dramatist, lived and studied in Warsaw

== Politicians ==
- Mordechai Anielewicz (1919–1943), leader of the Jewish Fighting Organization during the Warsaw Ghetto Uprising
- Menachem Begin (1913–1992), sixth Prime Minister of Israel and recipient of the Nobel Peace Prize, studied at the University of Warsaw
- Bolesław Bierut (1892–1956), first General Secretary of the Polish United Workers' Party and President of Poland from 1947 to 1952, lived in Warsaw and attended courses at the Warsaw School of Economics
- Alexander Chalmers (1645–1703), merchant, jurist, and politician, mayor of Old Warsaw, lived in Warsaw
- David Ben-Gurion (1886–1973), first Prime Minister of Israel, studied at the University of Warsaw
- Włodzimierz Cimoszewicz (born 1950), Prime Minister of Poland from 1996 to 1997, born in Warsaw
- Roman Dmowski (1864–1939), polish nationalist politician, studied at the University of Warsaw
- Marek Edelman (1919 or 1922–2009), the last surviving leader of the Warsaw Ghetto Uprising
- Alvin Gajadhur, politician, statesman, chemical engineer, and educator, the Minister of Infrastructure in 2023, the Chief Inspector of Road Transport from 2017 to 2024
- Aleksandra Gajewska (born 1989), Polish politician and businessperson, member of the Sejm of Poland since 2019
- Jarosław Kaczyński (born 1949), Prime Minister of Poland from 2006 to 2007, born in Warsaw
- Lech Kaczyński (1949–2010), mayor of Warsaw from 2002 to 2005, and President of Poland from 2005 to 2010, born in Warsaw
- Aleksandra Leo (born 1981), Polish politician and lawyer
- Rosa Luxemburg (1871–1919), Polish and German revolutionary socialist politician, lived and attended gymnasium (secondary school) in Warsaw
- Julian Marchlewski (1866–1925), Polish and German communist politician, lived and attended gymnasium (secondary school) in Warsaw
- Tadeusz Mazowiecki (1927–2013), first non-communist Polish prime minister since 1945, studied at the University of Warsaw
- Adam Michnik (born 1946), former dissident, co-founder and editor-in-chief of the newspaper Gazeta Wyborcza, born and live in Warsaw, studied at the University of Warsaw
- Jan Olszewski (1930–2019), Prime Minister of Poland from 1991 to 1992, born in Warsaw
- Ignacy Jan Paderewski (1860–1941), pianist, composer and Prime Minister of Poland in 1919, studied at the Warsaw Conservatory
- Józef Piłsudski (1867–1935), Polish statesman, Chief of State from 1918 to 1922 and first Marshal of Poland from 1920, lived and died in Warsaw
- Casimir Pulaski (1745–1779), Polish nobleman and American Revolutionary War general, born in Warsaw
- Mieczysław Rakowski (1926–2008), second-to-last communist Prime Minister of Poland from 1988 to 1989 and the last General Secretary of the Polish United Workers' Party, studied in Warsaw
- Konstanty Rokossowski (1896–1968), one of the most prominent Red Army commanders of World War II, Marshal of the Soviet Union and Marshal of Poland, Poland's Defence Minister from 1949 to 1956, born in Warsaw
- Adolf Warski (1868–1937), Polish communist leader and journalist
- David Shiffman (1923–1982), Israeli Deputy Minister of Transport
- Antoni Wąsik (1886–1956), socialist and trade union activist
- Stanisław Wojciechowski (1969–1953), second President of Poland, studied at the University of Warsaw
- Anna Maria Żukowska (born 1983), Polish politician and jurist, member of the Sejm since 2019

== Science ==
- Henryk Arctowski (1871–1958), scientist and explorer
- Tadeusz Banachiewicz (1882–1954), astronomer, mathematician and geodesist
- Jadwiga Bryła (born 1943), biochemist, born in Warsaw
- Andrzej Buras (born 1946), theoretical physicist
- Casimir Funk (1884–1967), biochemist, born in Warsaw
- Maciej Gliwicz (1939–2024), biologist and evolutionist specializing in the field of hydrobiology
- Mirosław Hermaszewski (1941–2022), Polish cosmonaut, fighter plane pilot, and Polish Air Force officer, studied and died in Warsaw
- Ludwik Hirszfeld (1884–1954), microbiologist and serologist
- Leonid Hurwicz (1917–2008), economist and mathematician, recipient of the Nobel Prize in Economics, studied at the University of Warsaw
- Aleksander Ihnatowicz, Polish programmer and retired actor, born in Warsaw
- Witold Lipski (1949–1985), computer scientist
- Benoit Mandelbrot (1924–2010), mathematician and polymath, born in Warsaw
- Witold Nazarewicz (born 1954), nuclear physicist
- Moshe Prywes (1914–1998), Israeli physician and educator, born in Warsaw and studied at the University of Warsaw
- Danuta Ptaszycka-Jackowska (1939–2025), geographer and landscape architect
- Aleksander Rajchman (1890–1940), mathematician
- Joseph Rotblat (1908–2005), physicist and recipient of the Nobel Peace Prize, born in Warsaw, studied at the Free Polish University and at the University of Warsaw
- Marie Skłodowska-Curie (1867–1934), physicist and chemist, recipient of the Nobel Prize in Physics and the Nobel Prize in Chemistry, born in Warsaw
- Julian Sochocki (1842–1927), mathematician
- Zofia Szmydt (1923–2010), mathematician
- Alfred Tarski (1901–1983), logician and mathematician, studied at the University of Warsaw
- Tadeusz Wojciechowski (1925–2026), economist, professor, participant in the Warsaw Uprising
- L. L. Zamenhof (1859–1917), creator of Esperanto language, lived in Warsaw
- Antoni Zygmund (1900–1992), mathematician

== Sport ==
- Weronika Araśniewicz (born 2008), footballer for the Poland national team
- Mateusz Bartel (born 1985), chess grandmaster
- Zbigniew Bartman (born 1987), volleyball player
- Anna Czerwińska (1949–2023), mountaineer
- Margo Dydek (1974–2011), basketball player
- Mariusz Fyrstenberg (born 1980), tennis player
- Małgorzata Glinka-Mogentale (born 1978), volleyball player, double European champion
- Andrzej Gołota (born 1968), boxer
- Anna Kiełbasińska (born 1990), sprinter
- Bartosz Kizierowski (born 1977), swimmer
- Ewa Kłobukowska (born 1946), sprinter, Olympic champion
- Janusz Kusociński (1907–1940), athlete, Olympic champion
- Robert Lewandowski (born 1988), footballer, born in Warsaw and studied at the Academy of Sport Education in Warsaw
- Paweł Nastula (born 1970), judoka; Olympic champion
- Konrad Niedźwiedzki (born 1985), speed skater
- Marek Papszun (born 1974), football manager
- Jerzy Pawłowski (1932–2005), fencer, Olympic champion
- Tadeusz Pietrzykowski (1917–1991), boxer, remembered as the "boxing champion of Auschwitz"
- Janusz Pyciak-Peciak (born 1949), modern pentathlete, Olympic champion
- Katarzyna Skowrońska-Dolata (born 1983), volleyball player
- Pia Skrzyszowska (born 2001), athlete specialising in hurdles
- Monika Soćko (born 1978), chess grandmaster
- Andrzej Supron (born 1952), wrestler, Olympic medallist
- Wojciech Szczęsny (born 1990), footballer
- Wojciech Szewczyk (born 1994), professional pool player
- Ilia Szrajbman (1907–1943), swimmer
- Iga Świątek (born 2001), professional tennis player, ranked as World No. 1, winner of four Grand Slam singles titles, winner of 2023 WTA Finals, born in Warsaw
- Grzegorz Tkaczyk (born 1980), handball player
- Mateusz Wieteska (born 1997), footballer
- Tomasz Wiktorowski (born 1981), tennis coach
- Szymon Winawer (1838–1919), chess player
- Krzysztof Włodarczyk (born 1981), boxer
- Maja Włoszczowska (born 1983), mountain biker, Olympic medallist
- Andrzej Wrona (born 1988), volleyball player
- Jacek Wszoła (born 1956), high jumper, Olympic champion
- Piotr Wyszomirski (born 1988), handball player
- Jan Zieliński (born 1996), tennis player
- Marcin Żewłakow (born 1976), football player

== Other ==
- Jan Gotlib Bloch (1836–1902), banker and railway financier
- Maria Cetys (1914–1944), Warsaw Uprising participant and teacher executed by Nazi Germany
- Joe Coral (born Kagarlitski) (1904–1996), bookmaker and founder of Coral bookmakers
- Barbara Bronisława Czarnowska (1810–1891), noblewoman and independence fighter
- Regina Fudem (1922–1943), a member of the Jewish Combat Organization
- Janusz Korczak (1878/1879–1942), pediatrician, children's author, pedagogue and children's rights advocate, killed in the Treblinka extermination camp
- Leopold Stanisław Kronenberg (1812–1878), banker, investor, and financier
- Benzion Netanyahu (1910–2012), encyclopedist, historian, and medievalist
- Irena Sendler (1910–2008), humanitarian, social worker, and nurse who served in the Polish Underground Resistance during World War II in German-occupied Warsaw
- Anna Szelągowska (1880–1962), feminist and union organizer
- Halina Weinstein (1902–1942), Polish Esperantist
