= Bryła =

Bryła is a Polish surname. Notable people with the surname include:

- Jadwiga Bryła (born 1943), Polish biochemist
- Patryk Bryła (born 1990), Polish footballer
- Stefan Bryła (1886–1943), Polish construction engineer and welding pioneer
