= Pacification of Powiśle Czerniakowskie =

Nazi crimes in Warsaw's Solec during the Warsaw Uprising

Coordinates: 52.2298°N 21.0381°E

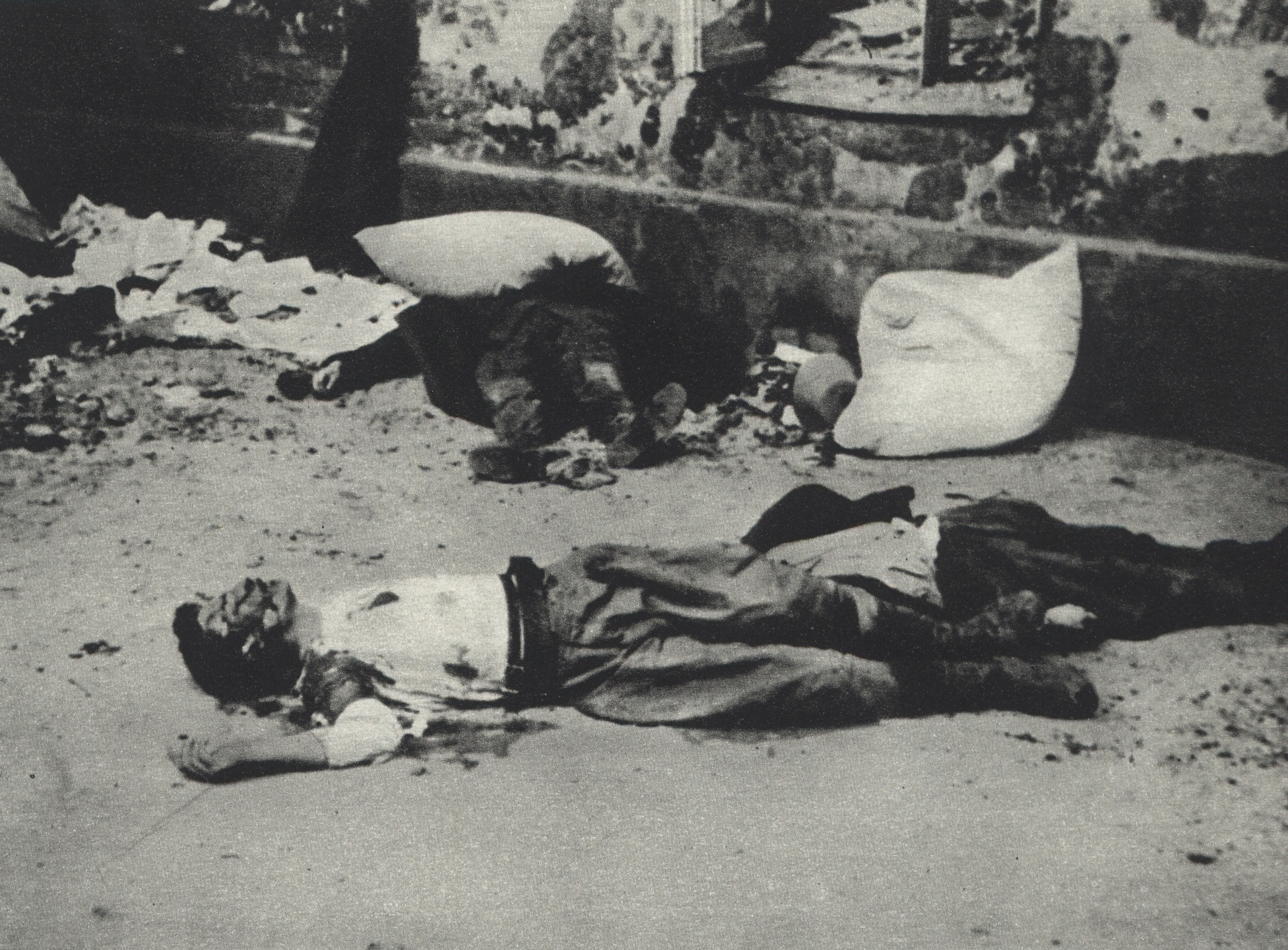
Polish insurgents murdered by Germans – September 1944

The pacification of Powiśle Czerniakowskie was a wave of mass murders, looting, and rapes that swept through Warsaw's Solec district (commonly known as Górny Czerniaków or Powiśle Czerniakowskie) during the Warsaw Uprising.

During the fighting on Powiśle Czerniakowskie from 11–23 September 1944, units of the German Reinefarth Combat Group murdered hundreds of captured Home Army soldiers (including many patients from insurgent hospitals) and committed numerous crimes against the civilian population of Górny Czerniaków.

== Beginning of the battle for the Czerniaków bridgehead ==
In early September 1944, the Soviet 47th and 70th Armies, part of the 1st Belorussian Front (commanded by Marshal Konstantin Rokossovsky), began preparations for a concentric assault on the German bridgehead east of Warsaw. On 14 September, after several days of combat, units of the Red Army and Polish Armed Forces liberated Warsaw's Praga.

Meanwhile, after capturing Warsaw's Old Town on 2 September 1944, the Germans failed – despite fierce attacks – to break the resistance of the main Home Army forces defending Śródmieście. Fearing that the Poles might soon link up with the Red Army, German command decided to direct their main thrust against insurgent positions along the Vistula river. On 6 September, after a three-day assault, northern Powiśle fell. On 11 September, the Germans launched an attack on Górny Czerniaków. SS-Obergruppenführer Erich von dem Bach-Zelewski planned to seize this part of the city with a concentric strike from two directions. From the north, part of the Reinefarth Combat Group, including the SS-Sonderregiment Dirlewanger – composed of German common criminals, probationary troops, SS and Polizei convicts, and a small number of poachers – would advance. From the south, the Rohr Combat Group was to attack, though its efforts were hampered as long as it remained engaged in fighting on Sielce.

Home Army command, anticipating the imminent arrival of Soviet forces, also deemed Powiśle Czerniakowskie a priority sector. They deployed the elite Radosław Group there, along with a significant portion of insurgent grenade and ammunition reserves.

== German crimes during the battle for Powiśle Czerniakowskie ==
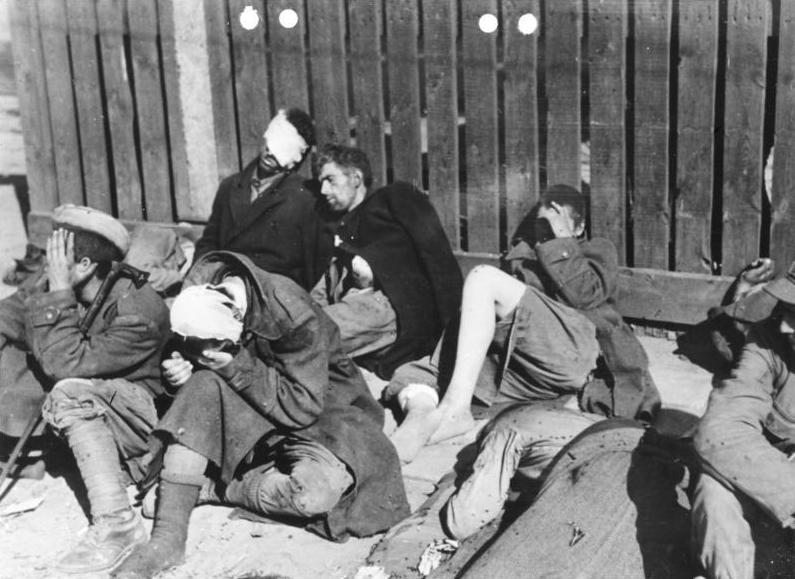
Home Army and Polish Armed Forces soldiers captured on Czerniaków

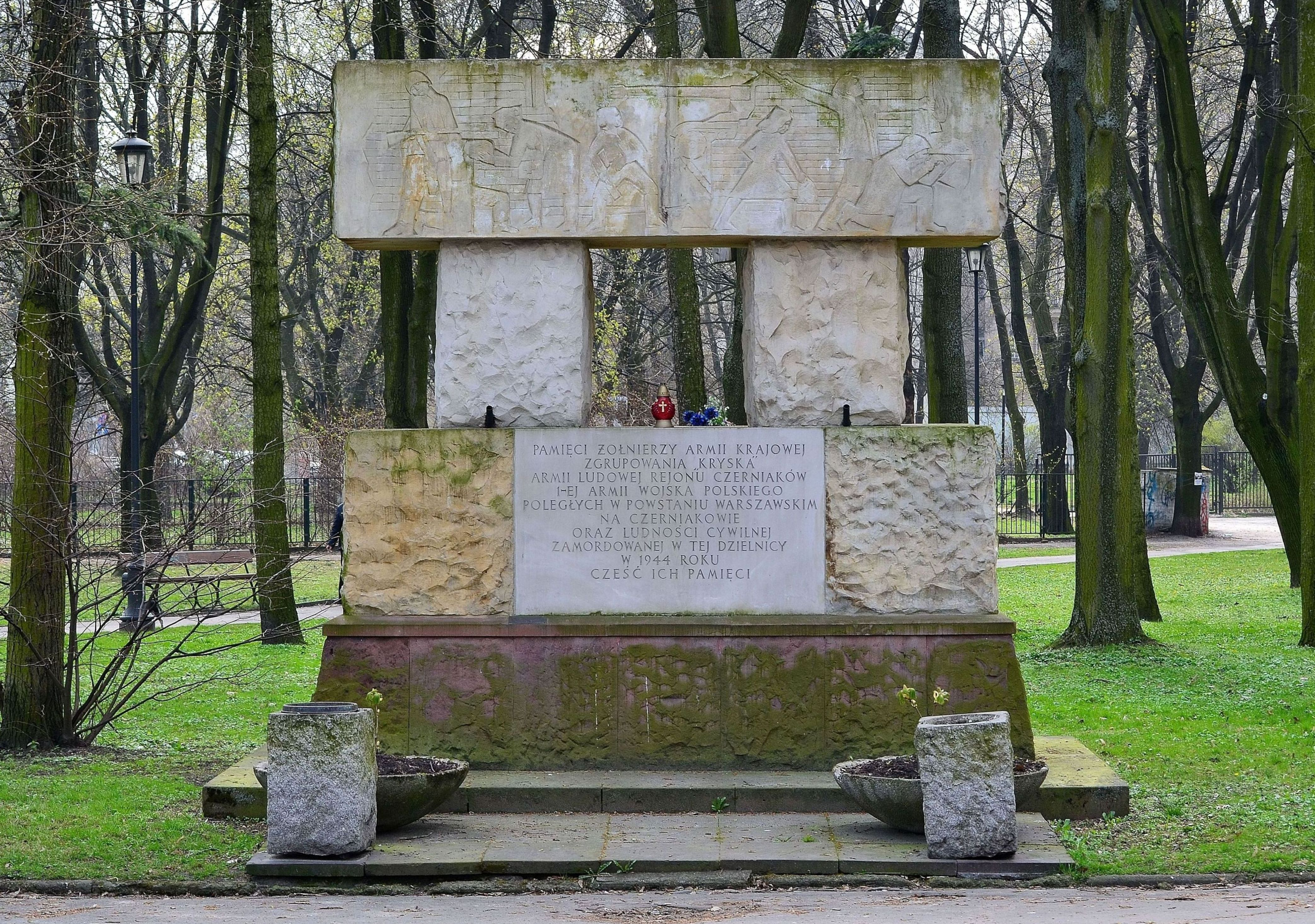
Monument commemorating Czerniaków's defenders and the district's murdered residents

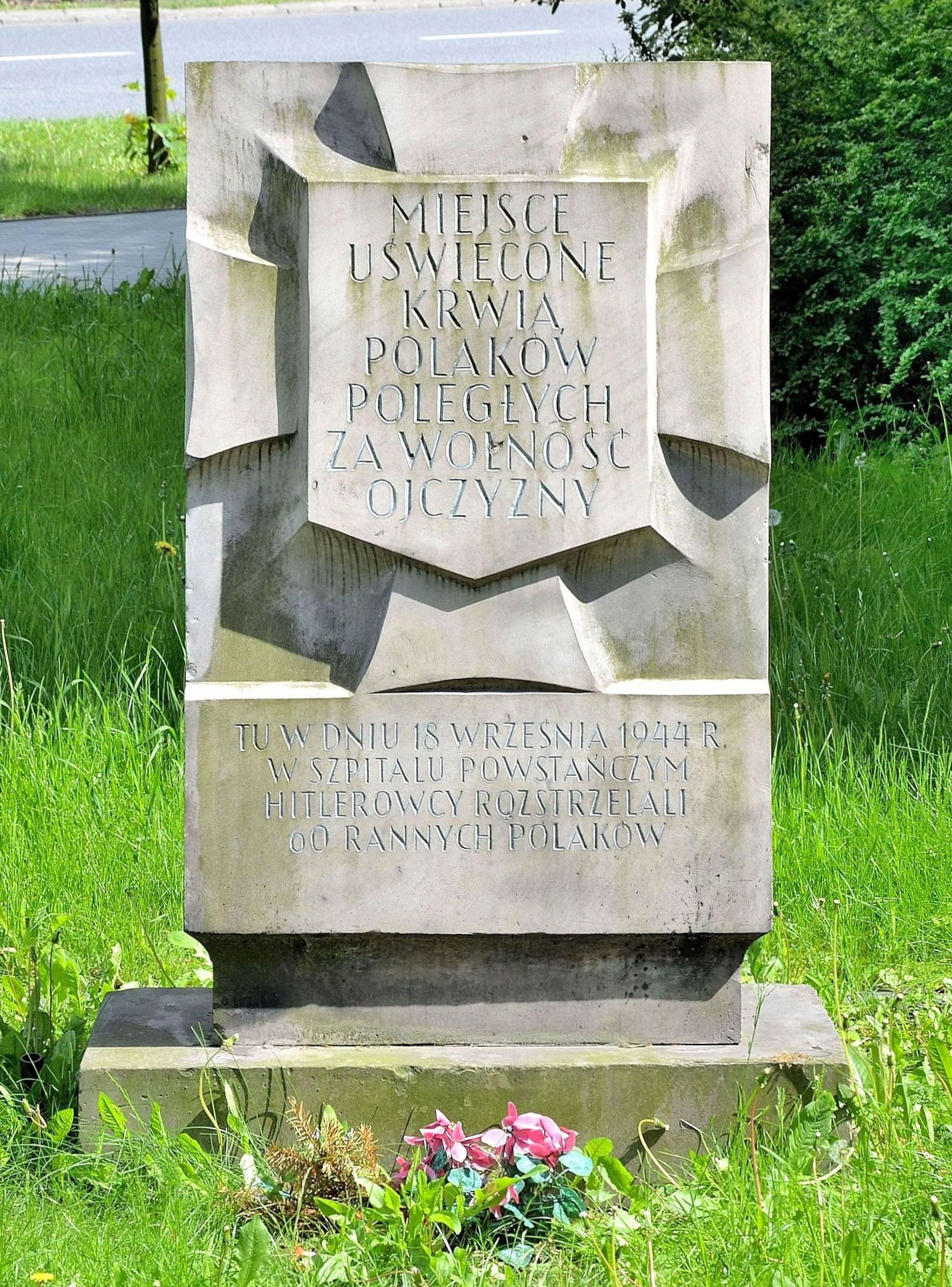
Tchorek plaque commemorating the massacre at the insurgent hospital at 41 Solec Street

On 30 August 1944, the governments of the United States and United Kingdom agreed to officially recognize the Home Army as an integral part of the Polish Armed Forces, entitled to full combatant rights. On 3 September 1944, the Deutsche Nachrichtenbüro broadcast a statement announcing that Germany, too, recognized the Home Army's combatant rights. In practice, however, captured insurgents were almost invariably murdered – regardless of gender or health condition. This persisted despite the Home Army fighting openly and bearing lawful military insignia, in accordance with the Hague Conventions. Insurgent couriers and nurses frequently fell victim to rapes. Captured Polish Armed Forces soldiers ("Berling's men") were generally spared, though there were instances of SS troops torturing and killing them as well.

By this stage of the uprising, the Germans no longer conducted mass exterminations of Warsaw's civilian population. However, on Powiśle Czerniakowskie, numerous ad hoc executions of civilians – particularly young men suspected of insurgent involvement – continued to occur. These killings were accompanied by looting and rapes. As in other Warsaw districts, Germans used civilians as "human shields", driving them ahead of their tanks.

During the fighting on Powiśle Czerniakowskie, insurgent hospitals became primary sites of mass murders of prisoners of war. On 13 September 1944, SS troops from the SS-Sonderregiment Dirlewanger stormed an insurgent stronghold in the ZUS building at 231 Czerniakowska Street, defended by Second Lieutenant Andrzej Samsonowicz's, codenamed Xiążę, platoon from the Zośka Battalion. The building housed an insurgent hospital – clearly marked with a Red Cross flag – directed by Dr. Zdzisław Górecki, serving as the main medical base for insurgent units on Powiśle Czerniakowskie. Germans and their eastern collaborators (mainly Azeris) fiercely attacked the building, supported by air forces and assault guns. Around noon, a fire broke out in the building, which could not be extinguished due to a lack of water. Heavy machine-gun fire from the nearby gasworks, St. Lazarus Hospital, and Na Skarpie Avenue prevented the evacuation of the wounded. The situation worsened around 5:00 PM when German planes bombed the hospital. The building partially collapsed, and a fire in the shelter where some wounded and sick were hiding killed dozens by burning them alive. Survivors were carried into the street amid ongoing combat, resulting in deaths among both staff and patients. Among those killed while rescuing the wounded were Dr. Zdzisław Górecki, Dr. Wanda Kozakiewicz-Grochowska, Dr. Mieczysław Dziewanowski, Dr. Tatiana Dziewanowska, and Dr. Zofia Pęska. About 120 patients were evacuated from the burning wing, but with the insurgent-held section of Czerniakowska Street also ablaze, medical staff had to move the wounded to the German-controlled gasworks. There, Dirlewanger's men beat and kicked them, looting valuables and raping women. A group of lightly wounded was escorted toward Frascati, while the severely wounded were likely slated for execution, though a Soviet air raid disrupted this plan. In the ensuing chaos, nurses, aided by civilians, transferred the wounded to the St. Kazimierz Institute on Tamka Street. That night, after the fires subsided, Germans entered the ZUS building and murdered the wounded and civilians who had not escaped earlier. Women were raped. In total, about 60 patients and hospital staff perished that day.

The next day, the Germans forced the insurgents to retreat from Czerniakowska Street to Zagórna Street, while also seizing the Przemysłowa Street area. Nearly 400 civilians were dragged from basements and herded to the Czerniaków Port, where Germans executed young men without attempting to prove their insurgent involvement. The port manager, Feliks Słoczyński, was among those killed. The rest were driven along Łazienkowska Street toward Agrykola Street.

On 15 September, in a shed at Idźkowski Street, Germans burned an unknown number of captured insurgents alive and hanged two people, including a nurse. That same day, Dirlewanger's SS troops seized Insurgent Hospital No. 1 ("Blaszanka"), located in the Citroën factory buildings at 199 Czerniakowska Street. Directed by Dr. Piotr Załęski, it housed 162 patients. Following a denunciation by a Volksdeutsche, German doctor Willy Schulze shot two wounded insurgents the next day. Rapes of nurses also occurred. On 26 September, during the hospital's evacuation, Germans executed 37 severely wounded patients unable to move. During the march to Warszawa Zachodnia station – from where the wounded and staff were deported to the Dulag 121 camp in Pruszków – Germans pulled several individuals from the column, suspecting them of Jewish origin or for drawing attention. Among them was Dr. Załęski's 17-year-old son, Maksymilian. They were taken to the Ordnungspolizei barracks at Narutowicz Square, and their fate remains unknown.

On 16 September, Germans stormed the insurgent hospital in the Public School No. 29 at 9 Zagórna Street, housing over 200 wounded. That evening, they took all mobile wounded, some severely wounded women, and medical staff to the Sicherheitspolizei headquarters on Szuch Avenue. Some young men suspected of insurgent involvement were shot there. About 80 severely wounded remained in the hospital's basements, most of whom were murdered by Germans. The next day, soldiers from the III Battalion of the 9th Infantry Regiment, arriving from across the Vistula, launched a counterattack that drove the Germans out and enabled the evacuation of surviving wounded.

On 18 September, Germans captured the insurgent hospital at 41 Solec Street but were quickly expelled by a Polish counterattack. As they withdrew, they set the building ablaze and prevented evacuation, firing on nurses and anyone attempting to escape. About 60 wounded and several nurses died in the flames or from German bullets. That day, in captured houses at 18/20 and 22 Wilanowska Street, Germans killed between dozens and over 200 people – wounded insurgents and young men suspected of insurgent activity.

On 19 September, Germans seized the property at 4 Idźkowski Street, where nearly 400 wounded and civilians had taken refuge. They murdered captured Home Army soldiers and drove civilians onto Idźkowski Street under crossfire, killing about 60. Survivors were herded to the school at 9 Zagórna Street, where men suspected of insurgent involvement were shot. Nurse Janina Paluchowska later testified to a "huge pile of bodies" of young girls and boys in the school courtyard.

On 20 September, the defenders' situation on Czerniaków became critical. The previous evening, about 260 soldiers from the Radosław Group (including 30 women), led by Colonel Jan Mazurkiewicz, evacuated to Mokotów via the sewers. Remaining on Powiśle Czerniakowskie were remnants of the Broda 53 Brigade and Kryska Group (about 200 Home Army soldiers under Captain Ryszard Białous, codenamed Jerzy), plus around 200 soldiers from the 9th Infantry Regiment of the Polish Armed Forces, led by Major Stanisław Łatyszonek. They held a block of houses at the southern corner of Wilanowska and Solec streets and a small Vistula riverbank section opposite Wilanowska Street. Morale among the defenders was beginning to falter. That day, Dirlewanger's men drove about 1,000 people from captured houses on Wilanowska Street to the Społem warehouses at the corner of Czerniakowska and Wilanowska streets, executing nearly 100 men and women suspected of insurgent involvement. Among the victims was the renowned insurgent courier Maria Cetys, codenamed Szympans.

On 21 September, fierce fighting continued on Solec. Germans struggled to capture houses at 4, 6, and 5 Wilanowska Street. Only two bomb-damaged tenements at 1 Wilanowska Street and 53 Solec Street, plus a 200-meter Vistula riverbank stretch with the partially sunken excursion boat Bajka, remained in Polish hands. At 5 Wilanowska Street, an insurgent hospital led by Dr. Irena Konopacka-Semadeni, codenamed Konstancja, was seized. Germans murdered 122 wounded, hanging 12 (including the chaplain Father Karol). In the basement, an SS officer personally shot 110 patients, forcing Dr. Konstancja to confirm each death. Among the victims was Captain Jan Misiurewicz, codenamed Topolnicki, a company commander in the Broda 53 Brigade. Dr. Konstancja risked her life to save 17 wounded from execution. A subsequent German officer permitted the evacuation of remaining survivors, though most of their fates are unknown. Seven of the most severely wounded, cared for by Dr. Konstancja with civilian help, are confirmed to have survived.

== Fall of Powiśle Czerniakowskie ==
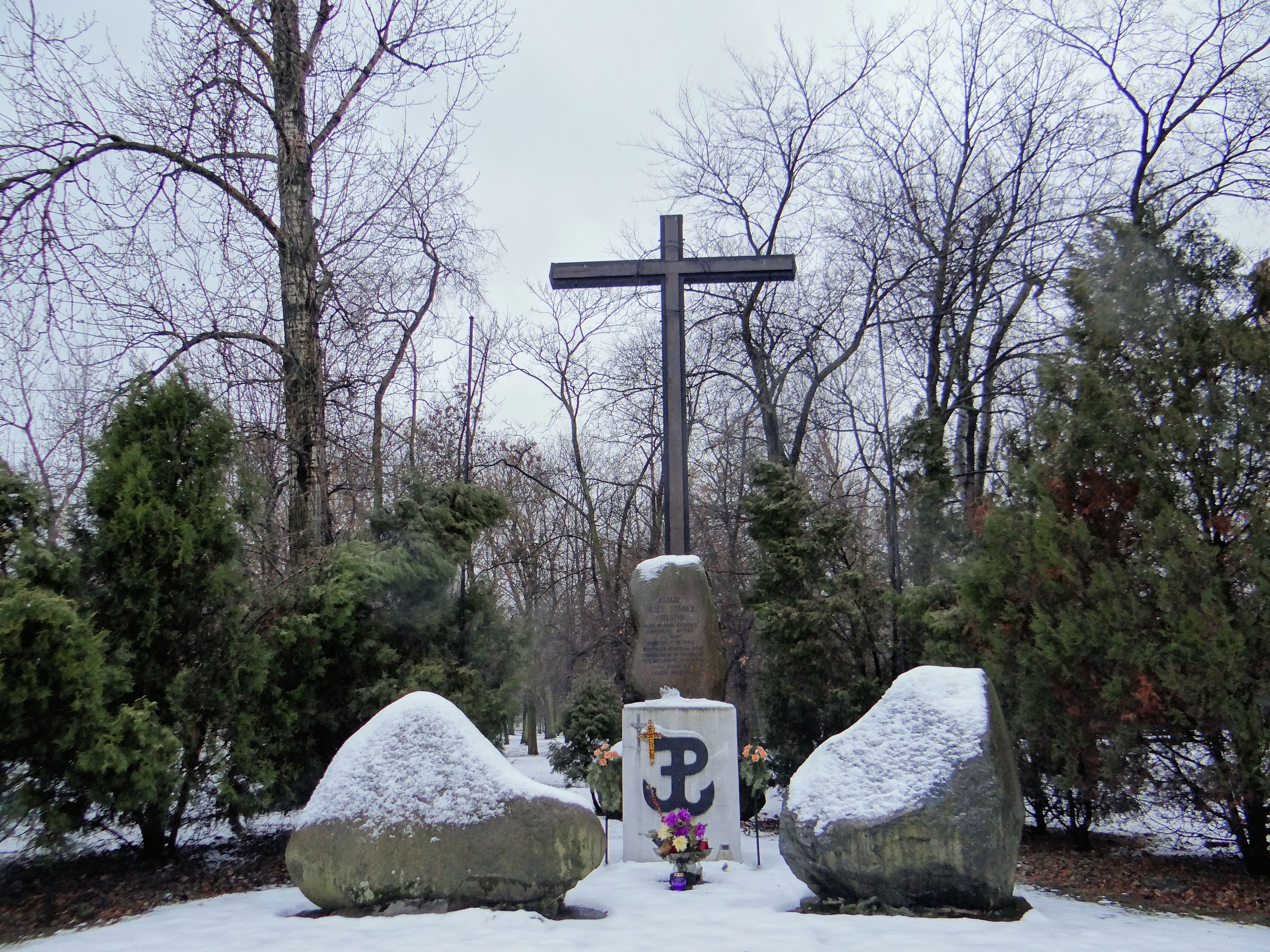
Memorial site dedicated to Father Józef Stanek

On 22 September, Germans assaulted the last Polish positions on Górny Czerniaków. The defenders lacked everything: ammunition, food, and even water, and were utterly exhausted. Evacuation across the Vistula was only partially successful. That evening, the defenders were informed that a one-time evacuation to the right bank was impossible due to insufficient crossing equipment, with boats from Praga able to operate for only a few nights. Most Home Army soldiers, along with Major Łatyszonek and 20 "Berling's men", attempted to break through to Polish-held Śródmieście. Only a five-person group led by Captain Jerzy reached insurgent lines; the rest, including Łatyszonek, were mostly captured.

On 23 September, in the morning, Germans overran the final Polish strongholds on Powiśle Czerniakowskie – houses at 1 Wilanowska Street and 53 Solec Street. German sources report 82 Polish Armed Forces soldiers ("legionnaires") and 57 Home Army soldiers taken prisoner. In the ensuing massacre, Germans killed between 120 and 200 people – Home Army soldiers, couriers, nurses, and young men suspected of insurgent activity. At the ultramarine factory near 53 Solec Street, 14 prisoners – including Father Józef Stanek, codenamed Rudy (chaplain of the Kryska Group), and five nurses – were hanged on transmission belts. Second Lieutenant Stanisław Warzecki, codenamed Jerzy Szumski, was also shot there. Another 30 insurgents were hanged near the KS Syrena dock (in an ice hall). Several wounded hiding on the Bajka were also killed. The SS units executing Czerniaków's last defenders were led by Major Kurt Fischer (Reinefarth's chief of staff), who later became police chief in Kassel post-war. German documents "justified" the killings by claiming the insurgents used German uniforms and equipment.

Surviving civilians and Home Army soldiers who blended into the crowd were driven to the Sicherheitspolizei headquarters on Szuch Avenue. Gestapo agents conducted another "selection", picking out young men and women suspected of insurgent involvement, who were then shot in the nearby ruins of the General Inspector of the Armed Forces. Powiśle Czerniakowskie residents who survived the Gestapo selections were marched to Warszawa Zachodnia station and deported to the Pruszków transit camp.

After the bridgehead's fall, SS troops captured six Home Army nurses and couriers (Grażyna Zasacka, Irena Kowalska-Wuttke, Barbara Plebańska, Krystyna Niżyńska from the Zośka Battalion, and unidentified Hanka and Marysia from the Parasol Battalion), who, with Kedyw comrades, tried hiding among civilians and captured "Berling's men". A Wehrmacht officer's intervention saved them from execution. They were taken to Szuch Avenue, then to Wola, where, likely that same day, the six girls who admitted to Home Army service were shot near the St. Wojciech Church.

== In culture ==
Scenes of murders and rapes by Germans in Czerniaków's insurgent hospital are depicted in the second volume of Roman Bratny's novel Kolumbowie. Rocznik 20 (Columbuses. Year 20) and in the final episode of the TV series based on the novel.

== See also ==
- Liquidation of the insurgent hospitals in Warsaw's Old Town

== Bibliography ==
- Borkiewicz, Adam (1969). Powstanie warszawskie. Zarys działań natury wojskowej [Warsaw Uprising: Outline of Military Operations] (in Polish). Warsaw: Pax.
- Grigo, Tadeusz (1989). Powiśle Czerniakowskie (in Polish). Warsaw: Wydawnictwo Ministerstwa Obrony Narodowej. ISBN 83-11-07667-7.
- Motyl, Maja; Rutkowski, Stanisław (1994). Powstanie Warszawskie – rejestr miejsc i faktów zbrodni [Warsaw Uprising: Register of Crime Sites and Facts] (in Polish). Warsaw: GKBZpNP-IPN.
- Sawicki, Tadeusz (2010). Rozkaz zdławić powstanie. Niemcy i ich sojusznicy w walce z powstaniem warszawskim [Order to Crush the Uprising: Germans and Their Allies in the Fight Against the Warsaw Uprising] (in Polish). Warsaw: Bellona Publishing House. ISBN 978-83-11-11892-8.
- Wiśniewska, Maria; Sikorska, Małgorzata (1991). Szpitale powstańczej Warszawy [Hospitals of Insurgent Warsaw] (in Polish). Warsaw: Rytm. ISBN 83-85249-04-4.
