= Maria Cetys =

Polish freedom fighter (born 1914)

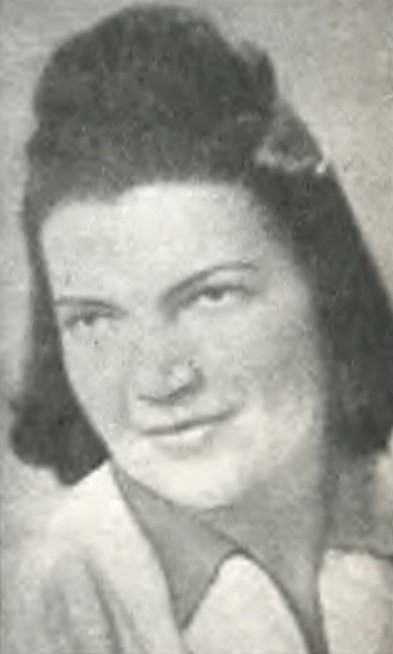
- Born: 14 September 1914; Warsaw, Congress Poland
- Died: 20 September 1944 (aged 30); Warsaw, German-occupied Poland
- Resting place: Warsaw Insurgents Cemetery

Maria Cetys (14 September 1914 – 20 September 1944) was a participant in the Warsaw Uprising, liaison officer of the "Kryska" grouping of the Home Army. Previously, she worked as a tax clerk. She was also an instructor of the Przysposobienie Wojskowe Kobiet.

In the Polish resistance she worked under the pseudonym "Szympans" ("Chimpanzee") and was a liaison officer of Władysław Abramowicz (aka "Litwin"), commander of the 2nd District of Śródmieście District of the Warsaw Home Army District.

== Death ==
Around 10 September 1944, she was seriously injured during the transfer of a report. Ten days later she was taken prisoner by the Germans in the area of the Wilanowska Street in Czerniaków. Then, when asked: (German) Bist du Banditin? (Are you one of the bandits?), she replied: I am a soldier of the Home Army. She was shot on the spot. These words became the motto of Adam Borkiewicz's work, the Warsaw Uprising. Outline of military activities 1944.

She was buried at the Warsaw Insurgents Cemetery.

== Personal life ==
Daughter of Stanisław and Amelia. Her brother was Teodor Cetys, a member of the Silent Unseen.

== Commemoration ==
In 2020, the road in Warsaw's Mokotów district, running from the Batalionu AK „Bałtyk” Street to the Dywizjonu AK „Jeleń” Street, was named after Maria Cetys.

== See also ==
- Home Army
