= Jadwiga Bryła =

Polish biochemist

Jadwiga Bryła (Polish pronunciation: [jadˈvi.ɡa ˈbrɨ.wa]; born 9 July 1943 in Warsaw) is a Polish biochemist. Since 1977 manager of Metabolism Regulation Department in Faculty of Biology in Warsaw University, and since 1983 professor in this faculty. Director of Biochemistry Institute. Since 1993 a member-correspondent of Polish Academy of Learning; she leads researches on regulations of intermediate transformations, especially on carbohydrates in animal tissues.

== Selections ==
Book publications

- Regulation of cell metabolism Polish Scientific Publishers PWN, (1981).

Journal publications

- Drożak J., Doroszewska K., Chodnicka K., Bryła J.Contribution of L-DOPA, dopamine and tyramine metabolism to the inhibition of gluconeogenesis in rabbit kidney-cortex tubules. 29th FEBS Meeting, Warsaw European Journal of Biochemistry Tom 271 Nr supl. 1 r. 2004, pp. 140–140
- Kiersztan A., Modzelewska A., Jarzyna R., Jagielska R., Bryła J. Inhibition of gluconeogenesis by vanadium and metformin in kidney-cortex tubules isolated from control and diabetic rabbits Biochemical Pharmacology Tome 63 2002, pp. 1371–1382
- Drożak J., Doroszewska R., Chodnicka K., Winiarska K., Bryła J. Contribution of L-3,4-dihydroxyphenylalanine metabolism to the inhibition of gluconeogenesis in rabbit kidney-cortex tubules International Journal of Biochemistry and Cell Biology Tome 37 2005, pp. 1269–1280
