= Centrum (municipal neighbourhood of Warsaw) =

- Municipal neighbourhood
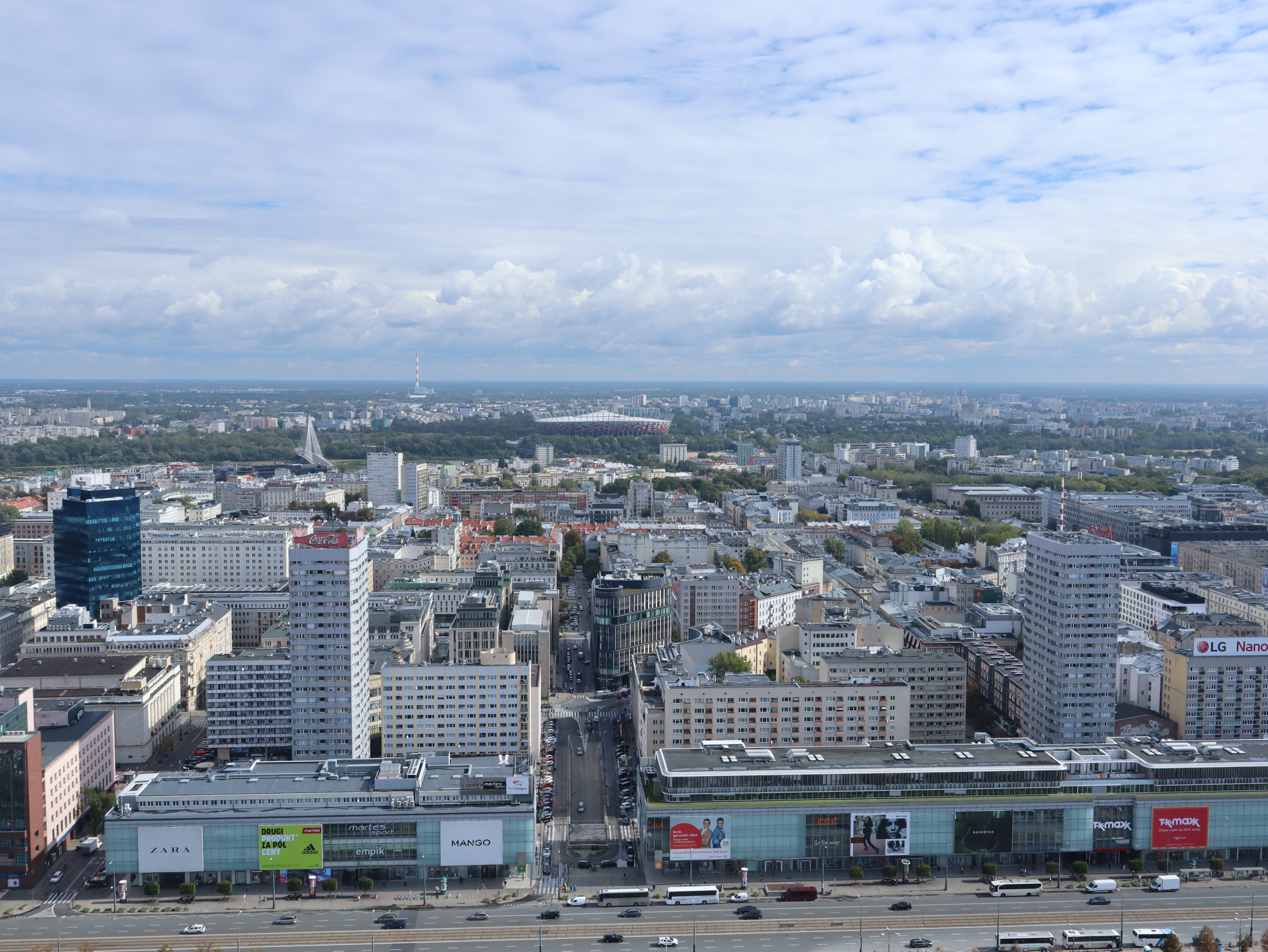
- Aerial view of Centrum, including West Wall, and the Złota Street, in 2019.
- Interactive map of Centrum
- Coordinates: 52°14′07″N 21°00′48″E
- Country: Poland
- Voivodeship: Masovian Voivodeship
- City county: Warsaw
- District: Śródmieście
- City Information System area: Śródmieście Północne
- Establishment: 10 March 2016
- Seat: 19 Widok Street, suite no. 201, Warsaw

Government
  - Type: Neighbourhood council
  - Council Leader: Andrzej Żurawski
- Time zone: UTC+1 (CET)
  - Summer (DST): UTC+2 (CEST)
- Area code: +48 22

Centrum, also known by its anglicized name Centre, and designated as the Neighbourhood No. 4, (Note: Polish: Osiedle nr 4, Osiedle nr IV) is a municipal neighbourhood of the city of Warsaw, Poland, located within the district of Śródmieście, and administered by a neighbourhood council. It is located within the City Information System area of Śródmieście Północne.

== History ==
The municipal neighbourhood of Centrum was established on 10 March 2016.

== Government ==
The neighbourhood government is divided into two organs, the neighbourhood council as the legislative body, and the neighbourhoo management as the executive body. Its seat is located at the 19 Widok Street, in suite no. 201.

The government is led by the council leader. Throughout the years, they were:

- 2016–2022: Andrzej Jacek Rokiciński;
- 2022–present: Andrzej Żurawski.

== Location and administrative boundaries ==
The neighbourhood of Centrum is located within the central portion of the district of Śródmieście (Downtown), in the city of Warsaw, Poland. It is located within the City Information System area of Śródmieście Północne. To the north, its border is determined by Krakowska Avenue. To the east, by Krakowskie Przedmieście Street, and Nowy Świat Street. To the south, by Jerusalem Avenue. To the west, by Marszałkowska Street.

It borders Osiedle Staromiejskie to the north, Powiśle-Skarpa to the east, Powiśle-Solec to the south-east, Krucza to the south, Koszyki to the south-west, and Żelazna Brama to the west.
