= Muranów (municipal neighbourhood) =

- Municipal neighbourhood
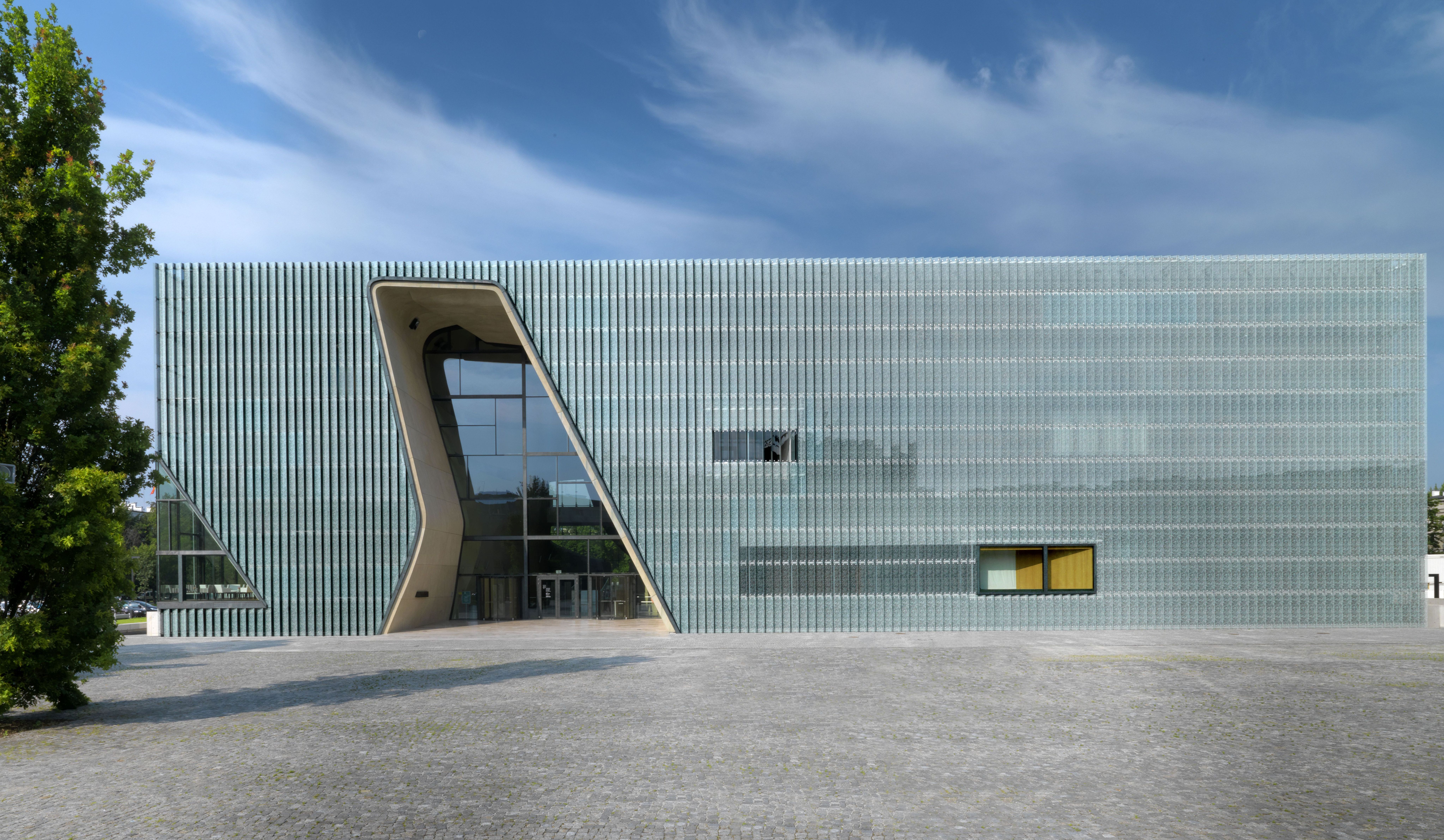
- POLIN Museum of the History of Polish Jews in Muranów, in 2013.
- Interactive map of Muranów
- Coordinates: 52°15′04″N 20°59′39″E
- Country: Poland
- Voivodeship: Masovian Voivodeship
- City county: Warsaw
- District: Śródmieście
- City Information System area: Muranów
- Establishment: 10 March 2016
- Seat: 9/11 Nowolipie Street, Warsaw

Government
  - Type: Neighbourhood council
  - Council Leader: Blanka Brzozowska-Jasińska
- Time zone: UTC+1 (CET)
  - Summer (DST): UTC+2 (CEST)
- Area code: +48 22

Muranów, also designated as the Neighbourhood No. 1, (Note: Polish: Osiedle nr 1, Osiedle nr I) is a municipal neighbourhood of the city of Warsaw, Poland, located within the district of Śródmieście, and administered by a neighbourhood council. It is located within the City Information System area of Muranów, within the historical neighbourhood of Muranów.

== History ==
The municipal neighbourhood of Muranów was established on 10 March 2016.

== Government ==
The neighbourhood government is divided into two organs, the neighbourhood council as the legislative body, and the neighbourhood management as the executive body. Its seat is located at the 9/11 Nowolipie Street.

The government is led by the council leader. Throughout the years, they were:

- 2016–2022: Ryszard Krzysztof Krzysztofowicz
- 2022–present: Blanka Brzozowska-Jasińska

== Location and administrative boundaries ==
The neighbourhood of Muranów is located within the north-western portion of the district of Śródmieście (Downtown), in the city of Warsaw, Poland. It is located within the City Information System area of Muranów.

To the north, its border is determined by Słomińskiego Street. To the east, by Andersa Street. To the south, by Solidarity Avenue. To the west, by Jana Pawła II Avenue.

It borders the neighbourhoods of Osiedle Staromiejskie to the east, and Żelazna Brama to the south. Its northern and western boundaries form the border of the district of Śródmieście, bordering districts of Żoliborz to the north, and Wola to the west.
