= Powiśle =

Powiśle may refer to:

- Powiśle, Warsaw
  - Powiśle-Skarpa
  - Powiśle-Solec
  - Warszawa Powiśle railway station
- Powiśle (region), a geographical region along the Vistula River in northern Poland
