= Oleandrów =

- Municipal neighbourhood
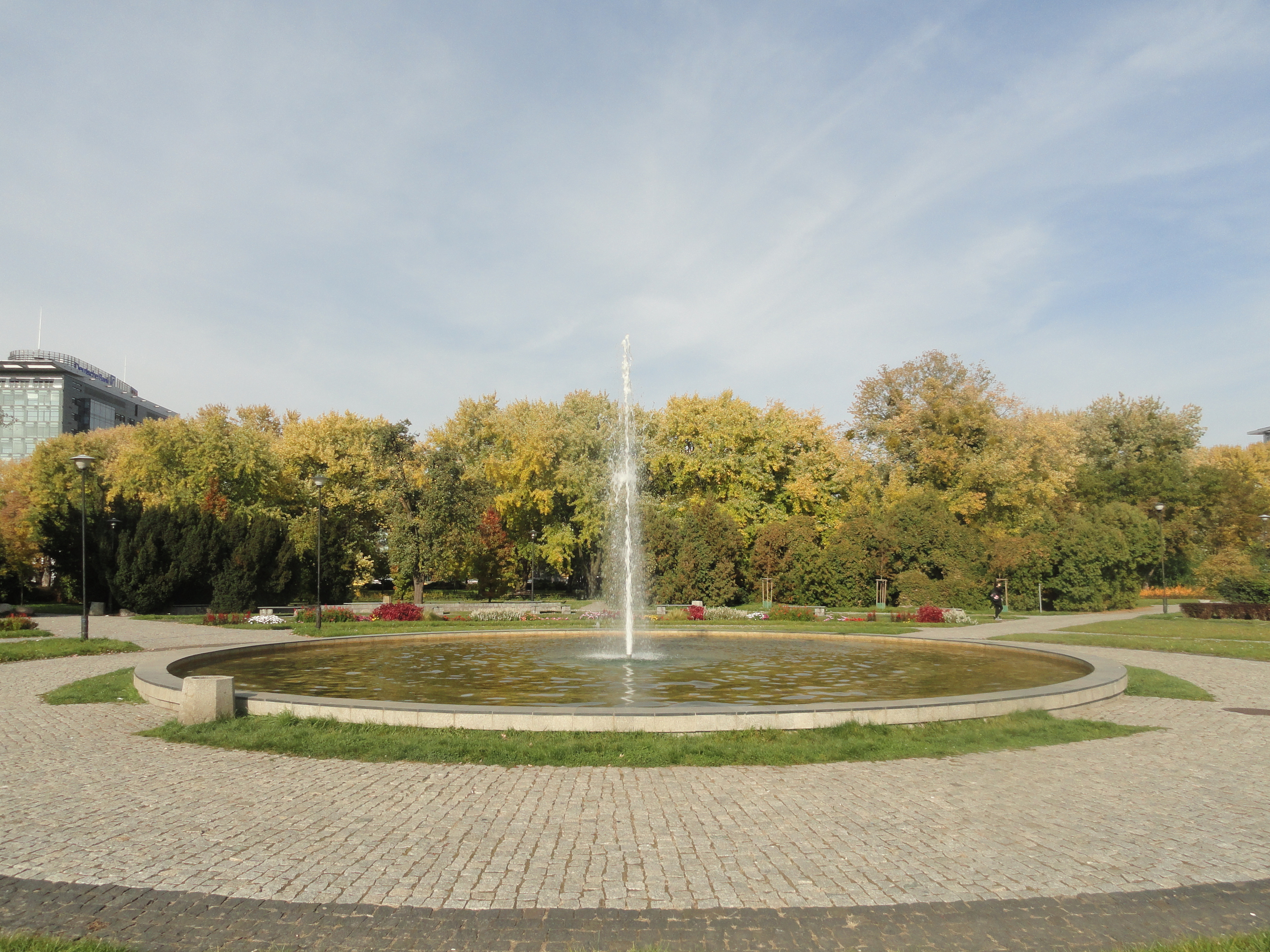
- A fountain in the Mokotów Field, in Oleandrów, in 2018.
- Interactive map of Oleandrów
- Country: Poland
- Voivodeship: Masovian Voivodeship
- City county: Warsaw
- District: Śródmieście
- City Information System areas: Śródmieście Południowe; Ujazdów
- Establishment: 10 March 2016
- Seat: 1 Marszałkowska Street, suite no. 7, Warsaw

Government
  - Type: Neighbourhood council
  - Council Leader: Agata Opyrchał-Jankowska
- Time zone: UTC+1 (CET)
  - Summer (DST): UTC+2 (CEST)
- Area code: +48 22

Oleandrów, also designated as the Neighbourhood No. 9, (Note: Polish: Osiedle nr 9, Osiedle nr IX) is a municipal neighbourhood of the city of Warsaw, Poland, located within the district of Śródmieście, and administered by a neighbourhood council. It is located within the City Information System areas of Śródmieście Południowe, and Ujazdów.

== Name ==
The name of the neighbourhood, Oleandrów, comes from the Oleandrów Street which is located within it. Its name comes from the Oleandry Street in the city of Kraków.

== History ==
The municipal neighbourhood of Oleandrów was established on 10 March 2016.

== Government ==
The neighbourhood government is divided into two organs, the neighbourhood council as the legislative body, and the neighbourhood management as the executive body. Its seat is located at the 1 Marszałkowska Street, in suite no. 7.

The government is led by the council leader. Throughout the years, they were:

- 2016–2022: Jan Rybczyński
- 2022–present: Agata Opyrchał-Jankowska

== Location and administrative boundaries ==
The neighbourhood boundaries are determined by the Armii Ludowej Avenue to the north, Ujazdów Avenue, and Parkowa Street to the east, Klonowa Street and Spacerowa Street to the south-east, Batorego Street and Boya-Żeleńskiego Street to the south-west, and Independence Avenue to the west. It is located within the City Information System areas of Śródmieście Południowe, and Ujazdów.
