= Złote Tarasy =

Commercial, office, and entertainment complex in Warsaw, Poland

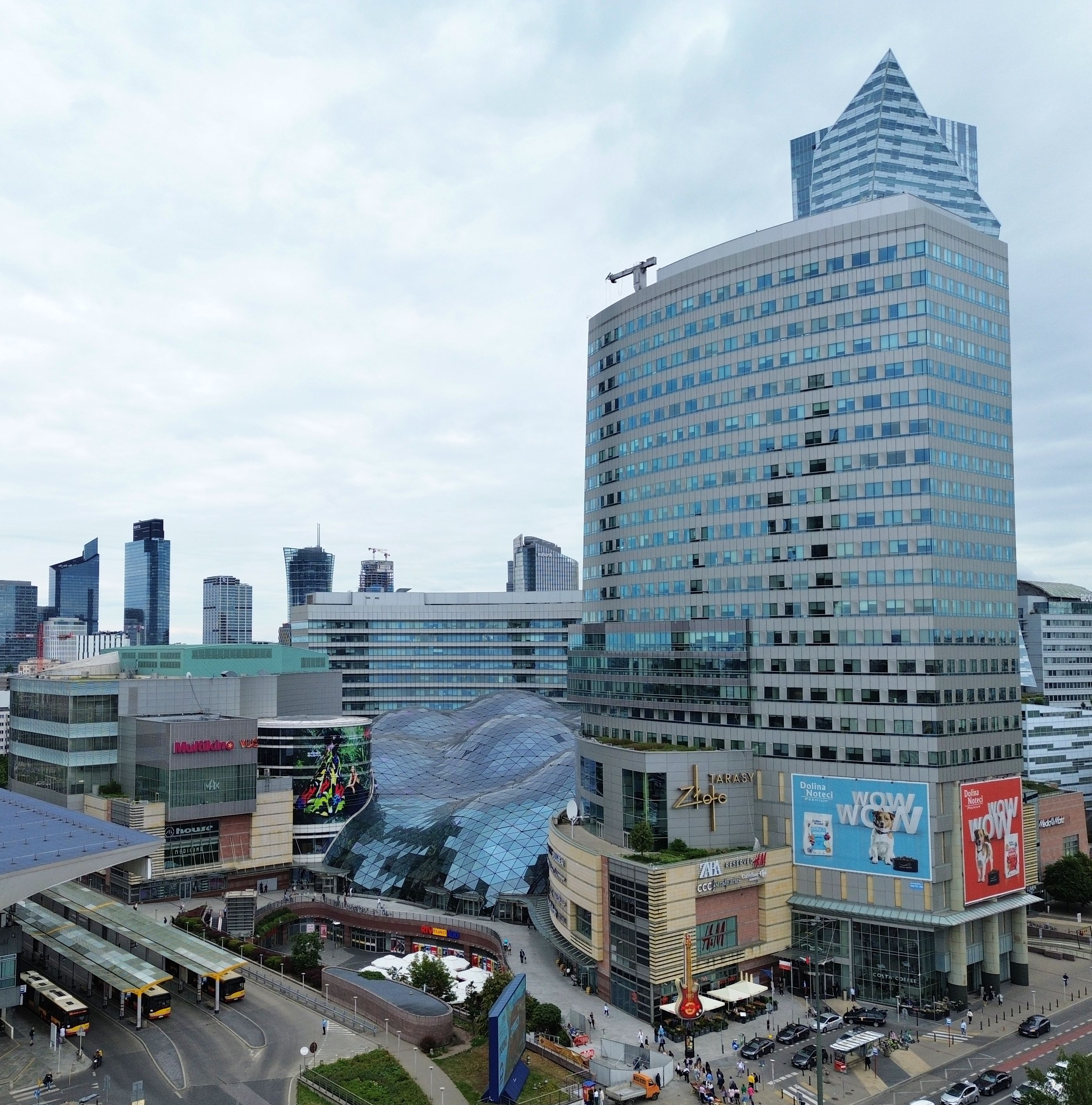
- The Złote Tarasy complex, 2024
- Interactive map of the Złote Tarasy area

General information
- Type: Office and retail complex
- Location: Warsaw, Poland, 59 Złota Street
- Coordinates: 52°13′48.59″N 21°00′08.69″E
- Construction started: October 2002
- Completed: 7 February 2007
- Owner: Unibail-Rodamco-Westfield

Height
- Height: 105 m (344 ft)

Technical details
- Floor count: 26

Design and construction
- Architecture firm: Jerde Partnership; Hrynkiewicz i Synowie Pracownia Architektoniczna
- Main contractor: Skanska; Waagner-Biro
- Awards and prizes: Waagner-Biro won the European Steel Design Award 2007; Jerde Partnership won 2006 Architectural Review MIPIM AR Future Projects Award in the Retail and Leisure category

The Złote Tarasy (Polish: [ˈzwɔ.tɛ ˈta.rasɘ̟]), also known by its anglicized name Golden Terraces, is a commercial, office, and entertainment complex in the city centre of Warsaw, Poland. It is located at 59 Złota Street, between Jana Pawła II and Emilii Plater. It was opened on 7 February 2007. The complex consists of Złote Tarasy shopping centre, Lumen office building, and the Skylight office skyscraper building, which is among top 30 tallest buildings in the city. The complex is owned by Unibail-Rodamco-Westfield.

It is located within the district of Śródmieście (Downtown), in the municipal neighbourhood of Żelazna Brama, and the City Information System area of Śródmieście Północne. Next to it area located the Warszawa Centralna (Warsaw Central) railway station, the Palace of Culture and Science, and Złota 44.

== History ==
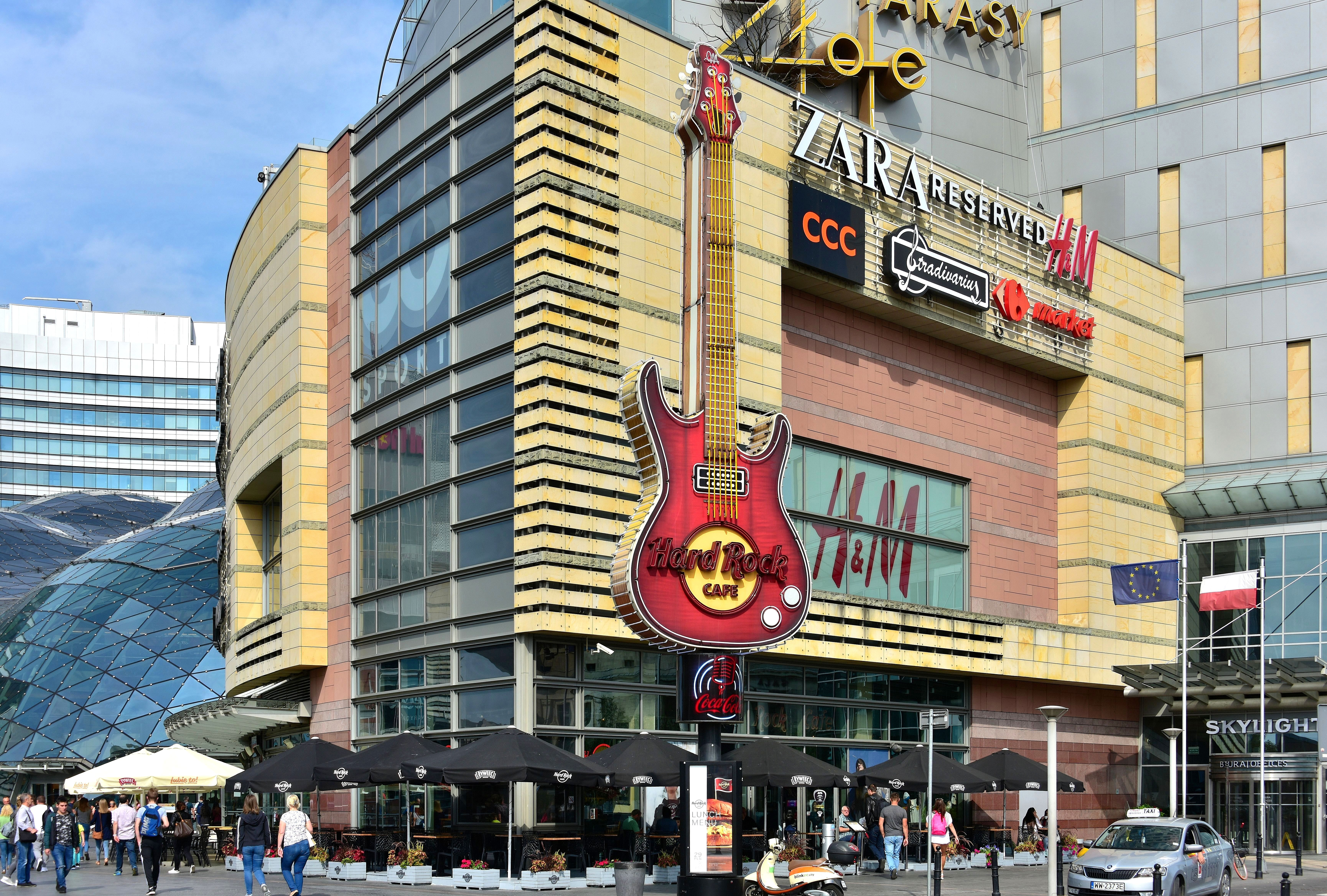
The Hard Rock Cafe bar in Złote Tarasy, the first bar of that chain opened in Poland in 2007. Picture taken in 2019.

The building investor was ING Real Estate (part of ING Group), and the main contractor was Skanska construction company. The complex was mainly designed by California-based architectural firm of Jerde Partnership. The building construction was designed by Polish branch of engineer company Ove Arup & Partners, and its electrical installations, by Tebodin. The Złote Tarasy shopping centre portion was designed by Poland-based architectural firm of Hrynkiewicz i Synowie Pracownia Architektoniczna, and its glass diagrid roof was designed and built by Waagner-Biro. The entire investment cost 1.5 billion Polish złoty.

The construction of the complex began in October 2002. Złote Tarasy private limited company was established to oversea the investment. The city government of Warsaw had donated the plot of land on which the complex had been built, as apportionment, in exchange for portion of shares in the company. The construction was finished in February 2007. The Złote Tarasy shopping centre portion of the complex was opened on 7 February 2007. The complex is owned by Unibail-Rodamco-Westfield.

For its design, Jerde Partnership had received the 2006 Architectural Review MIPIM AR Future Projects Award in the Retail and Leisure category. For the design of the glass diagrid roof Waagner Biro had won the 2007 European Steel Design Award.

The city of Warsaw had sold its shares in Złote Tarasy company in 2002, and in 2013. In 2002, 23.15 percent of shares were sold for 66.2 million Polish złoty, and in 2013, its remaining 23.15 percent of shares were sold for 217.6 million Polish złoty.

In 2007, in Złote Tarasy was opened the first Hard Rock Cafe bar in Poland.

Since 2009, the Skylight building of the complex houses the embassy of the United Arab Emirates.

== Building complex ==
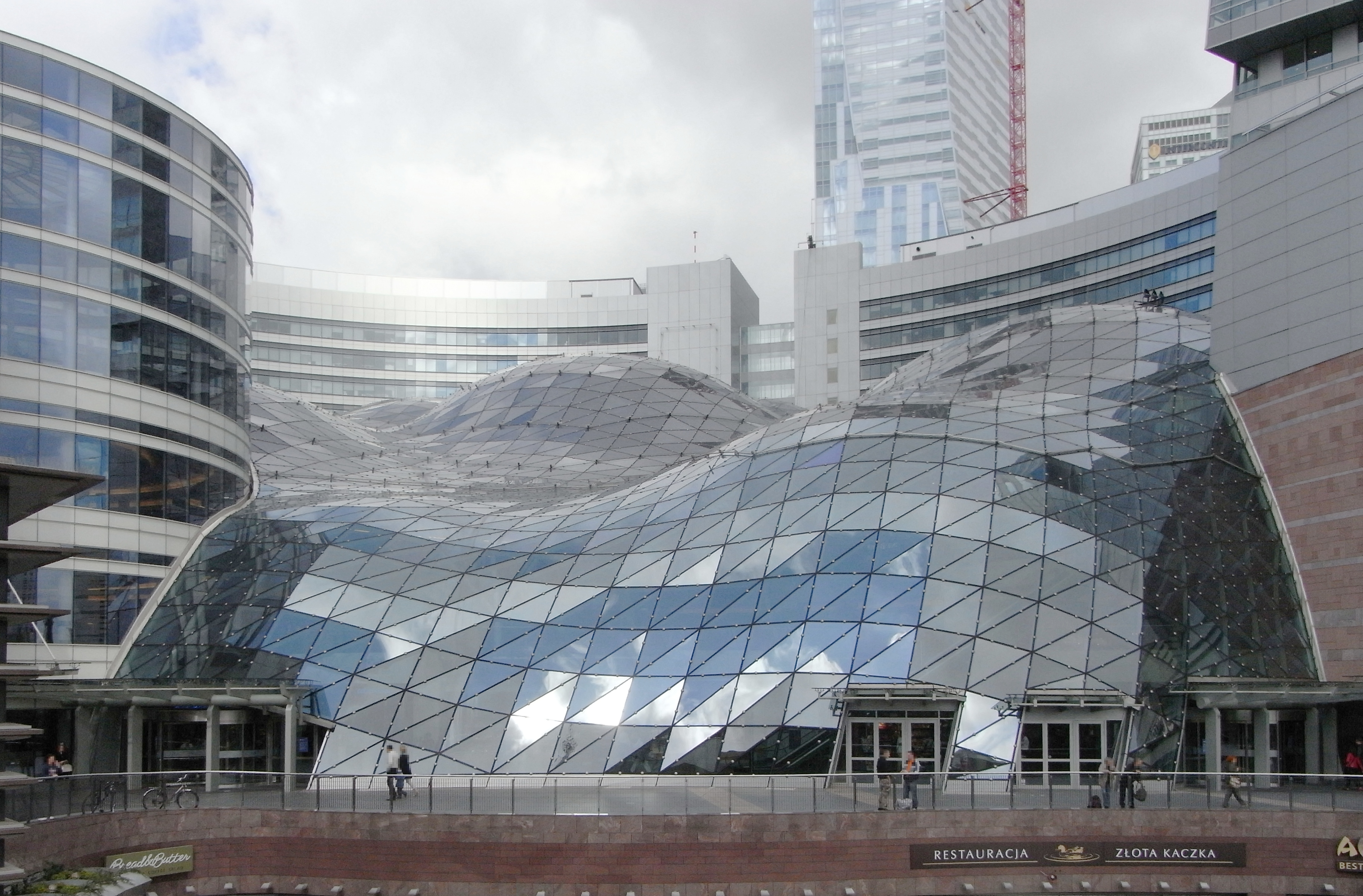
The entrance and glass and steel diagrid roof of the Złote Tarasy shopping centre, in 2012

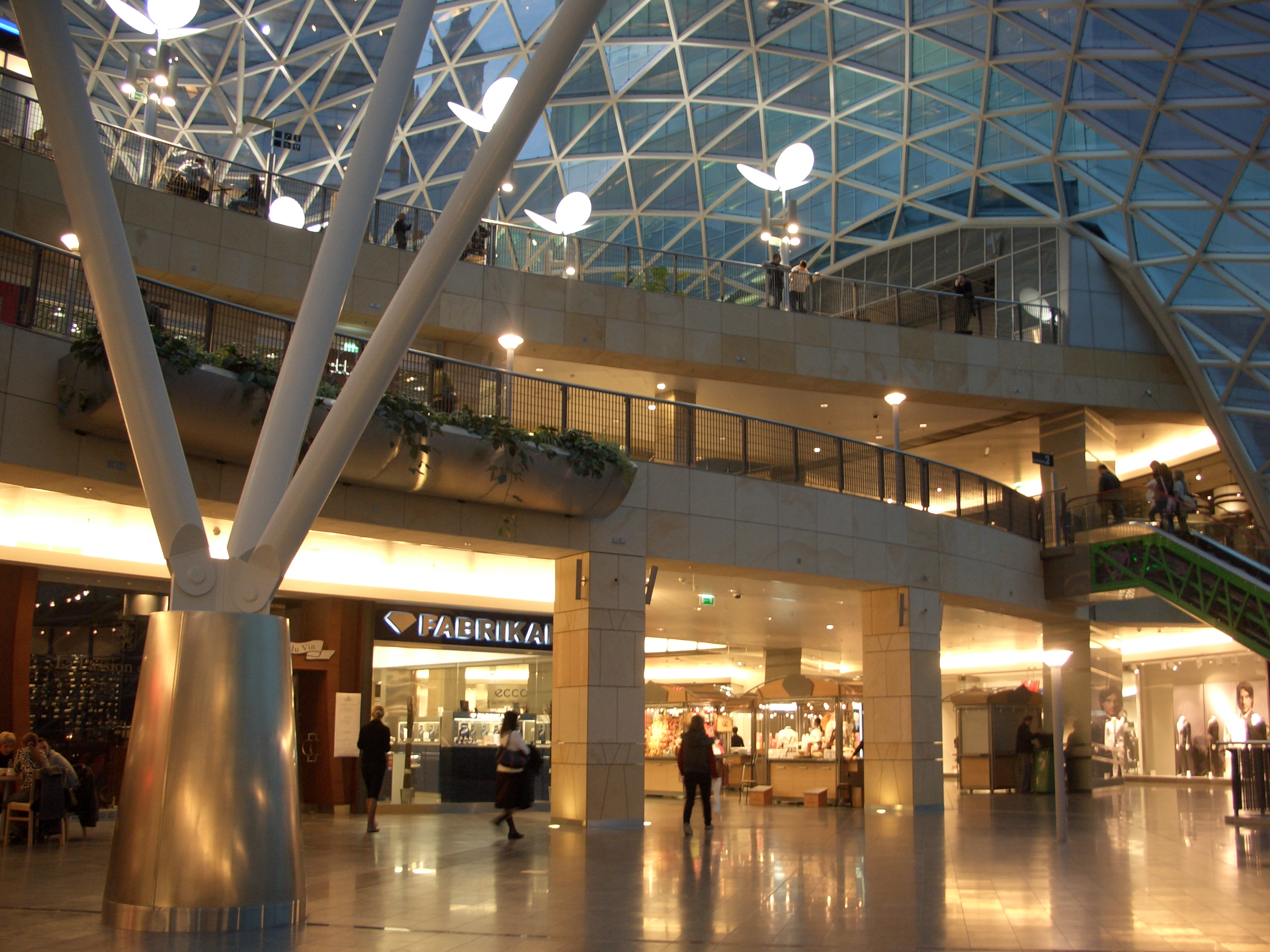
The interior of the Złote Tarasy shopping centre, in 2007

Złote Tarasy complex is located at 59 Złota Street, and its total area amounts to 205 000 m² (2 206 602 sq ft.). It consists of three portions, which are: Złote Tarasy shopping centre, Lumen office building, and the Skylight office skyscraper building.

The Złote Tarasy shopping centre has an area of 65 000 m² (699 654 sq ft.). In 2020, in the building operated 200 stores, and 30 restaurants, coffeehouses and bars, and a cinema. Among them is the first Hard Rock Cafe bar in Poland. The shopping centre has 5 storeys. The building was designed in blobitecture movement, with big portion of its roof consisting of glass and steel diagrid.

The Lumen office building has an area of 23 500 m² (252 952 sq ft.), of which 21 000 m² (226 042 sq ft.) is designated for office spaces. It has 5 storeys, and is 59 m (193.6 ft.) tall.

The Skylight office skyscraper building, located near the Emilii Plater Street, has 26 storeys, and is 105 m (344.5 ft.) tall. As of April 2023, it is the 28th tallest buildings in the city. It has an area of 45 000 m² (484 376 sq ft.), of which 18 335 m² (197 356 sq ft.) is dedicated to the office spaces.

Skylight houses the embassy of the United Arab Emirates.

== See also ==
- List of tallest buildings in Poland
- List of tallest buildings in Warsaw
