= Osiedle Staromiejskie =

- Municipal neighbourhood
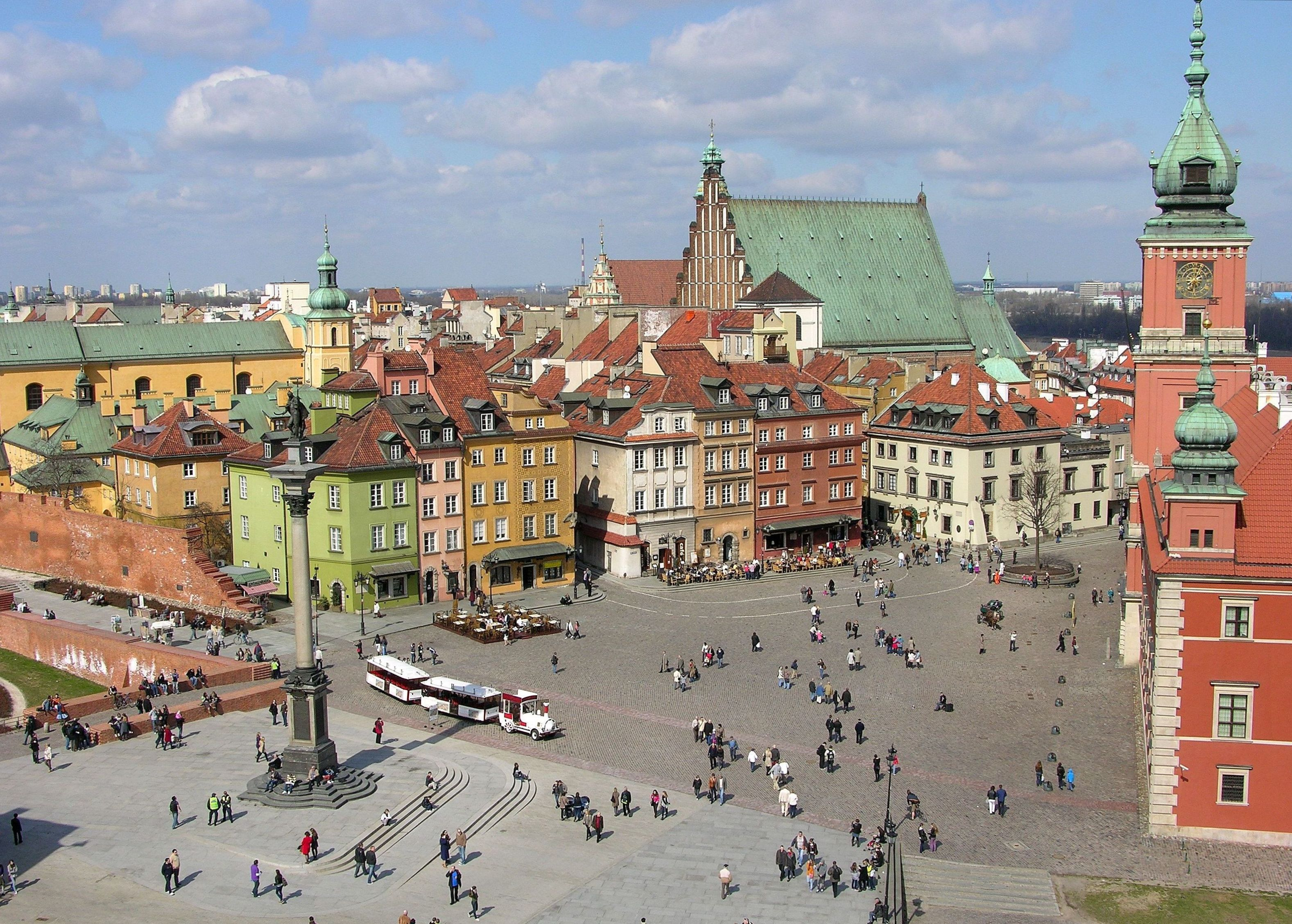
- The Castle Square, located in Osiedle Staromiejskie, in 2011.
- Country: Poland
- Voivodeship: Masovian Voivodeship
- City county: Warsaw
- District: Śródmieście
- City Information System areas: New Town; Old Town; Muranów; Powiśle; Śródmieście Północne
- Establishment: 10 March 2016
- Seat: 17 Świętojańska Street, suite no. 9, Warsaw

Government
  - Type: Neighbourhood council
  - Council Leader: Krzysztof Robert Górski
- Time zone: UTC+1 (CET)
  - Summer (DST): UTC+2 (CEST)
- Area code: +48 22

Osiedle Staromiejskie, (Note: Translation from Polish: Old Town Neighbourhood) also designated as the Neighbourhood No. 2, (Note: Polish: Osiedle nr 2, Osiedle nr II) is a municipal neighbourhood of the city of Warsaw, Poland, located within the district of Śródmieście, and administered by a neighbourhood council. It is located within the City Information System areas of New Town, Old Town, Muranów, Powiśle, and Śródmieście Północne.

== History ==
The municipal neighbourhood was established on 10 March 2016.

== Government ==
The neighbourhood government is divided into two organs, the neighbourhood council as the legislative body, and the neighbourhood management as the executive body. Its seat is located at the 17 Świętojańska Street, in suite no. 9.

The government is led by the council leader. Throughout the years, they were:

- 2016–2022: Jakub Zajkowski
- 2022–present: Krzysztof Robert Górski

== Location and administrative boundaries ==
The neighbourhood boundaries are determined by the railway tracks next to Słomińskiego Street and the Gdańsk Bridge to the north, Vistula river to the east, Karowa Street, Krakowskie Przedmieście Street, and Królewska Street to the south, and Andersa Street to the west. It is located within the City Information System areas of New Town, Old Town, Muranów, Powiśle, and Śródmieście Północne.
