= Powiśle-Solec =

- Municipal neighbourhood
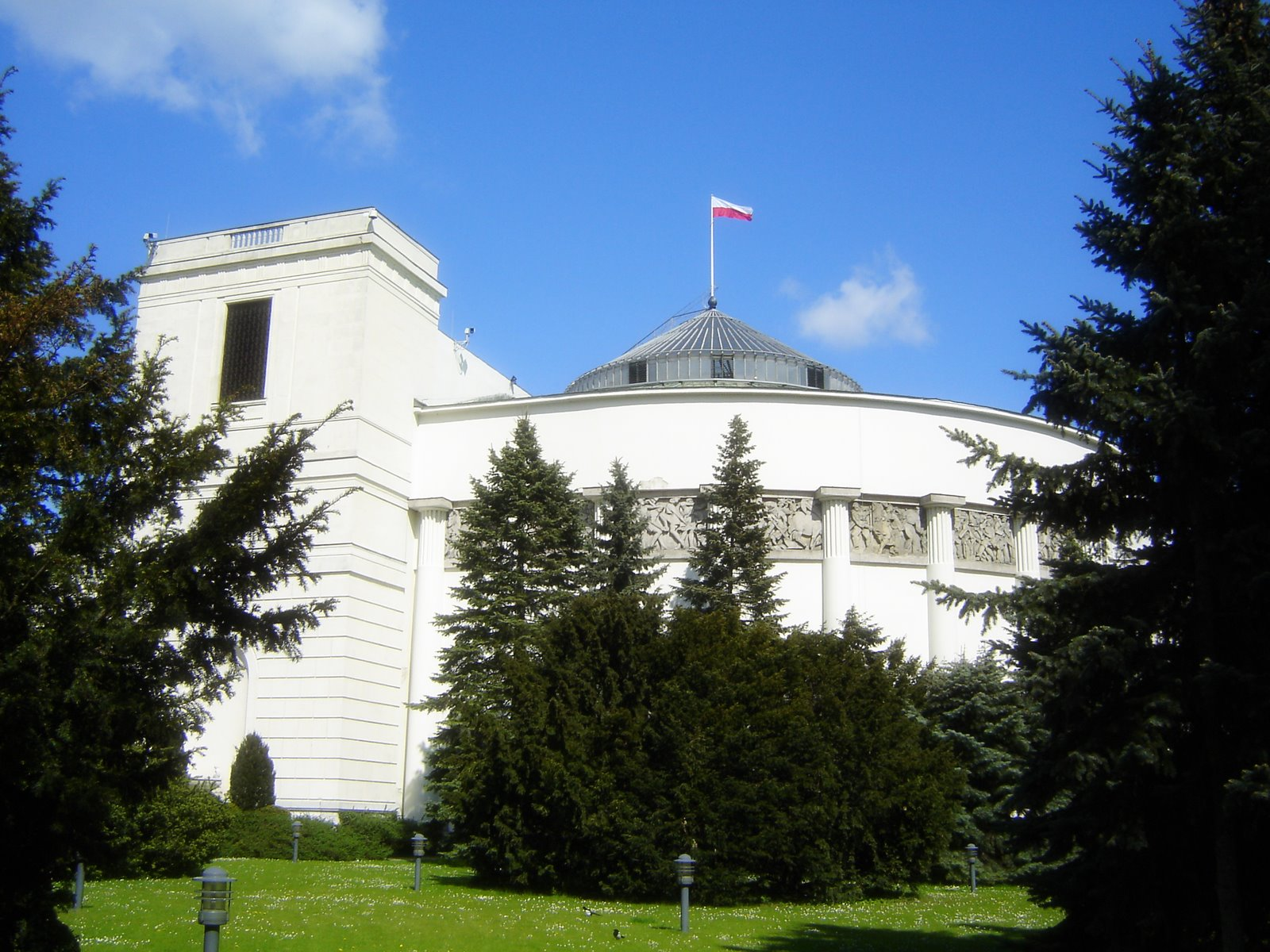
- The main building of the Sejm and Senate Complex, with the Sejm Meeting Hall, located in Powiśle-Solec, in 2007.
- Country: Poland
- Voivodeship: Masovian Voivodeship
- City county: Warsaw
- District: Śródmieście
- City Information System area: Powiśle; Solec; Śródmieście Południowe; Ujazdów
- Establishment: 10 March 2016
- Seat: 12 Okrąg Street, Warsaw

Government
  - Type: Neighbourhood council
  - Council Leader: Wiesław Krawczyński
- Time zone: UTC+1 (CET)
  - Summer (DST): UTC+2 (CEST)
- Area code: +48 22

Powiśle-Solec, also designated as the Neighbourhood No. 8, (Note: Polish: Osiedle nr 8, Osiedle nr VIII) is a municipal neighbourhood of the city of Warsaw, Poland, located within the district of Śródmieście, and administrated by a neighbourhood council. It is located within the City Information System areas of Powiśle, Solec, Śródmieście Południowe, and Ujazdów.

== History ==
The municipal neighbourhood of Powiśle-Solec was established on 10 March 2016.

== Government ==
The neighbourhood government is divided into two organs, the neighbourhood council as the legislative body, and the neighbourhood management as the executive body. Its seat is located at 12 Okrąg Street.

The government is led by the council leader. Throughout the years, they were:

- 2016–2022: Maciej Edward Orczykowski;
- 2022–present: Wiesław Krawczyński.

== Location and administrative boundaries ==
The neighbourhood boundaries are determined by Jerusalem Avenue, Leona Kruczkowskiego Street, Czerwonego Krzyża Street, Solec Street, railway tracks of the Warsaw Cross-City Line, and the Cross-City Bridge, to the north, Vistula river to the east, the south fence around the building property the Warsaw Municipal Waterwarks and Sewers Company near the Osadnik Czerniakowski water reservoir, Stanisława Mikkego Street, Czerniakowska Street, Nowosielecka Street, Adolfa Suligowskiego Street, Podchorążych Street, Jurija Gagarina Street, Nowy Świat Street, Three Crosses Square, Ujazdów Avenue, and Parkowa Street to the west. It is located within the City Information System areas of Powiśle, Solec, Śródmieście Południowe, and Ujazdów.
