= Koszyki =

- Municipal neighbourhood
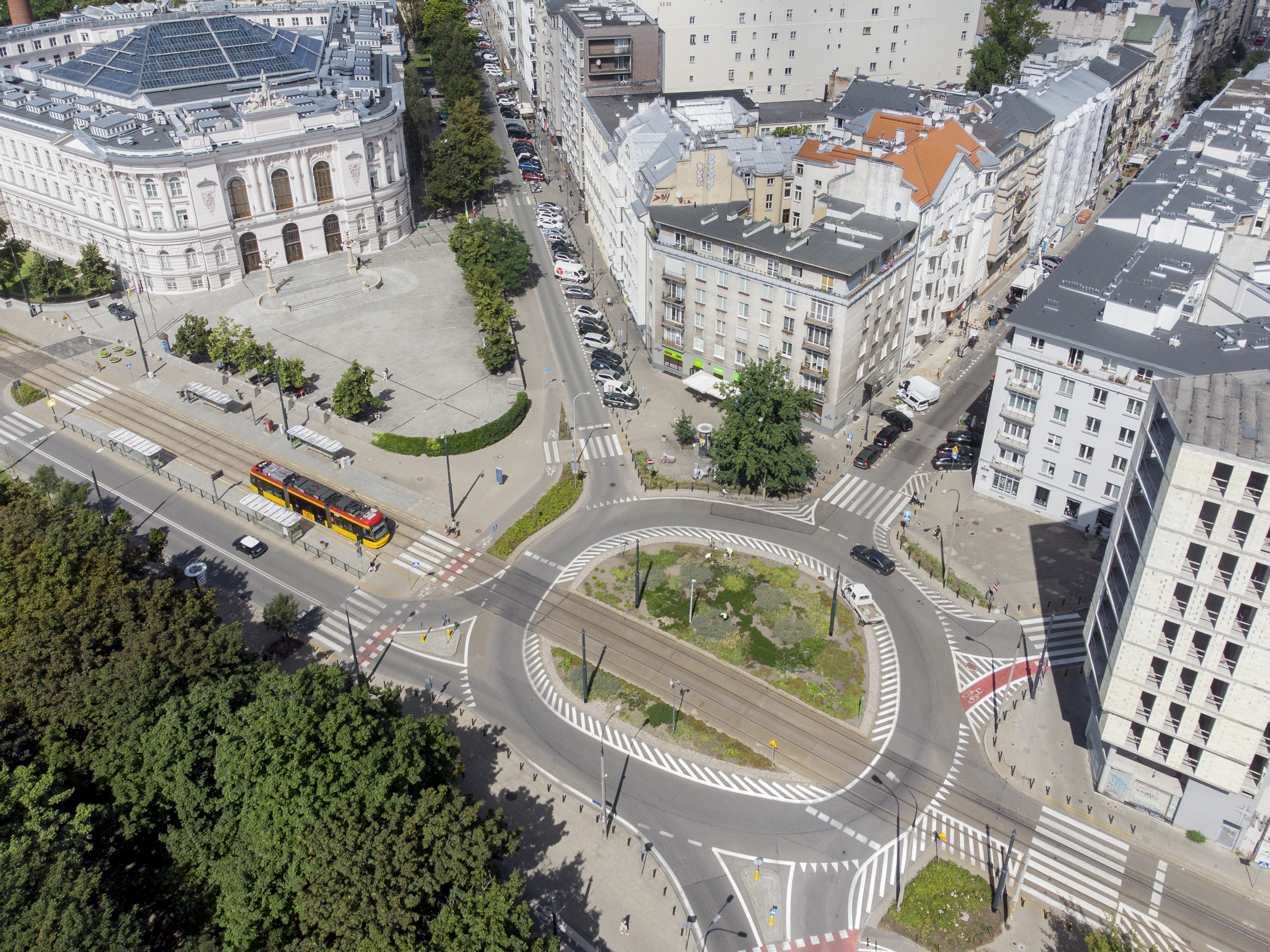
- Aerial view of the University of Technology Square and the Main Building of the Warsaw University of Technology, located in Koszyki, in 2022.
- Country: Poland
- Voivodeship: Masovian Voivodeship
- City county: Warsaw
- District: Śródmieście
- City Information System area: Śródmieście Południowe
- Establishment: 10 March 2016
- Seat: 47 Jerusalem Avenue, Warsaw

Government
  - Type: Neighbourhood council
  - Council Leader: Paweł Pokorski
- Time zone: UTC+1 (CET)
  - Summer (DST): UTC+2 (CEST)
- Area code: +48 22

Koszyki, also designated as the Neighbourhood No. 6, (Note: Polish: Osiedle nr 6, Osiedle nr VI) is a municipal neighbourhood of the city of Warsaw, Poland, located within the district of Śródmieście, and administered by a neighbourhood council. It is located within the City Information System area of Śródmieście Południowe.

== History ==
The municipal neighbourhood of Koszyki was established on 10 March 2016.

== Government ==
The neighbourhood government is divided into two organs, the neighbourhood council as the legislative body, and the neighbourhoo management as the executive body. Its seat is located at the 47 Jerusalem Avenue.

The government is led by the council leader. Throughout the years, they were:

- 2016–2022: Ewa Czerwińska;
- 2022–present: Paweł Pokorski.

== Location and administrative boundaries ==
The neighbourhood boundaries are determined by the Jerusalem Avenue to the north, Marszałkowska Street to the east, Armii Ludowej Avenue to the south, and Independence Avenue, and Chałubińskiego Street to the west. It is located within the City Information System area of Śródmieście Południowe.
