= Powiśle-Skarpa =

- Municipal neighbourhood
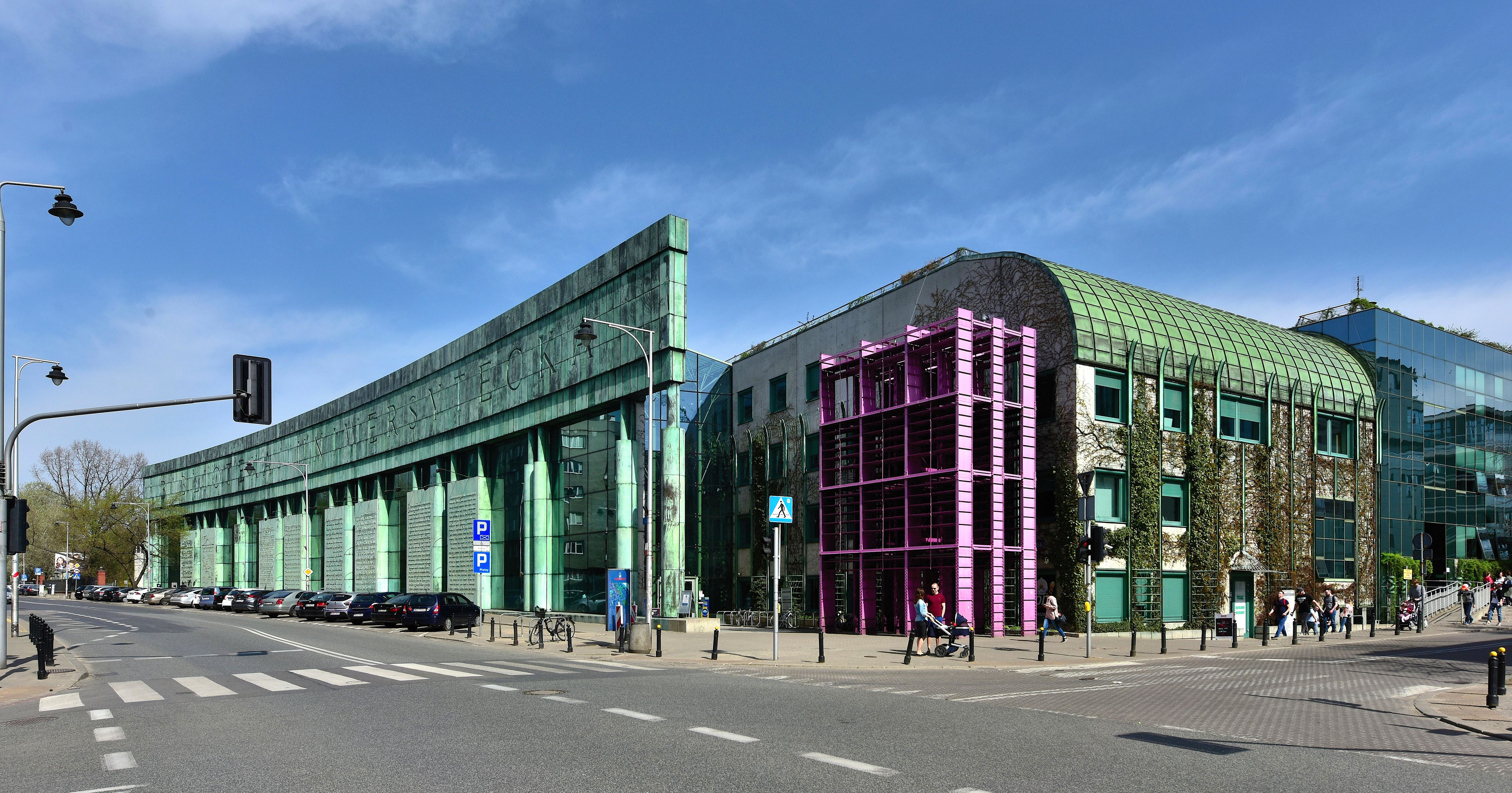
- The University of Warsaw Library located in Powiśle-Skarpa, in 2018.
- Country: Poland
- Voivodeship: Masovian Voivodeship
- City county: Warsaw
- District: Śródmieście
- City Information System areas: Powiśle; Śródmieście Północne
- Establishment: 10 March 2016
- Seat: 9 Ordynacka Street, suite no. 36, Warsaw

Government
  - Type: Neighbourhood council
- Time zone: UTC+1 (CET)
  - Summer (DST): UTC+2 (CEST)
- Area code: +48 22

Powiśle-Skarpa, also designated as the Neighbourhood No. 5, (Note: Polish: Osiedle nr 5, Osiedle nr V) is a municipal neighbourhood of the city of Warsaw, Poland, located within the district of Śródmieście, and administrated by a neighbourhood council. It is located within the City Information System areas of Powiśle, and Śródmieście Północne.

== History ==
The municipal neighbourhood of Powiśle-Skarpa was established on 10 March 2016.

== Government ==
The neighbourhood government is divided into two organs, the neighbourhood council as the legislative body, and the neighbourhoo management as the executive body. Its seat is located at the 9 Ordynacka Street, in suite no. 36.

== Location and administrative boundaries ==
The neighbourhood boundaries are determined by the Karowa Street to the north, Vistula river to the east, Jerusalem Avenue, Leona Kruczkowskiego Street, Czerwonego Krzyża Street, Solec Street, railway tracks of the Warsaw Cross-City Line, and the Średnicowy Bridge, to the south, and the Krakowskie Przedmieście Street, and Nowy Świat Street to the west. It is located within the City Information System areas of Powiśle, and Śródmieście Północne.
