= Muranów =

Neighbourhood in Warsaw, Poland

Coordinates: 52.2514°N 20.9945°E

- Warsaw neighbourhood
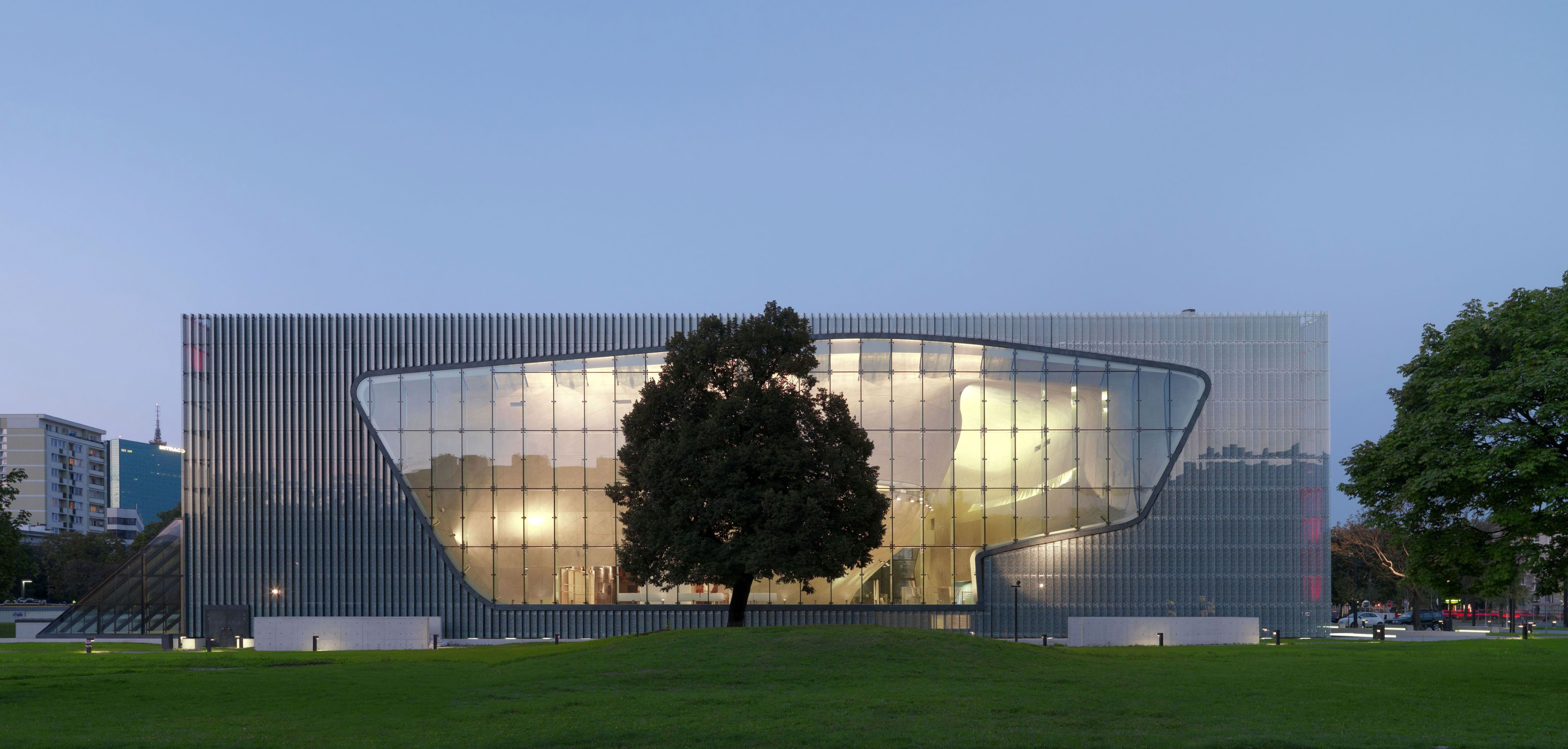
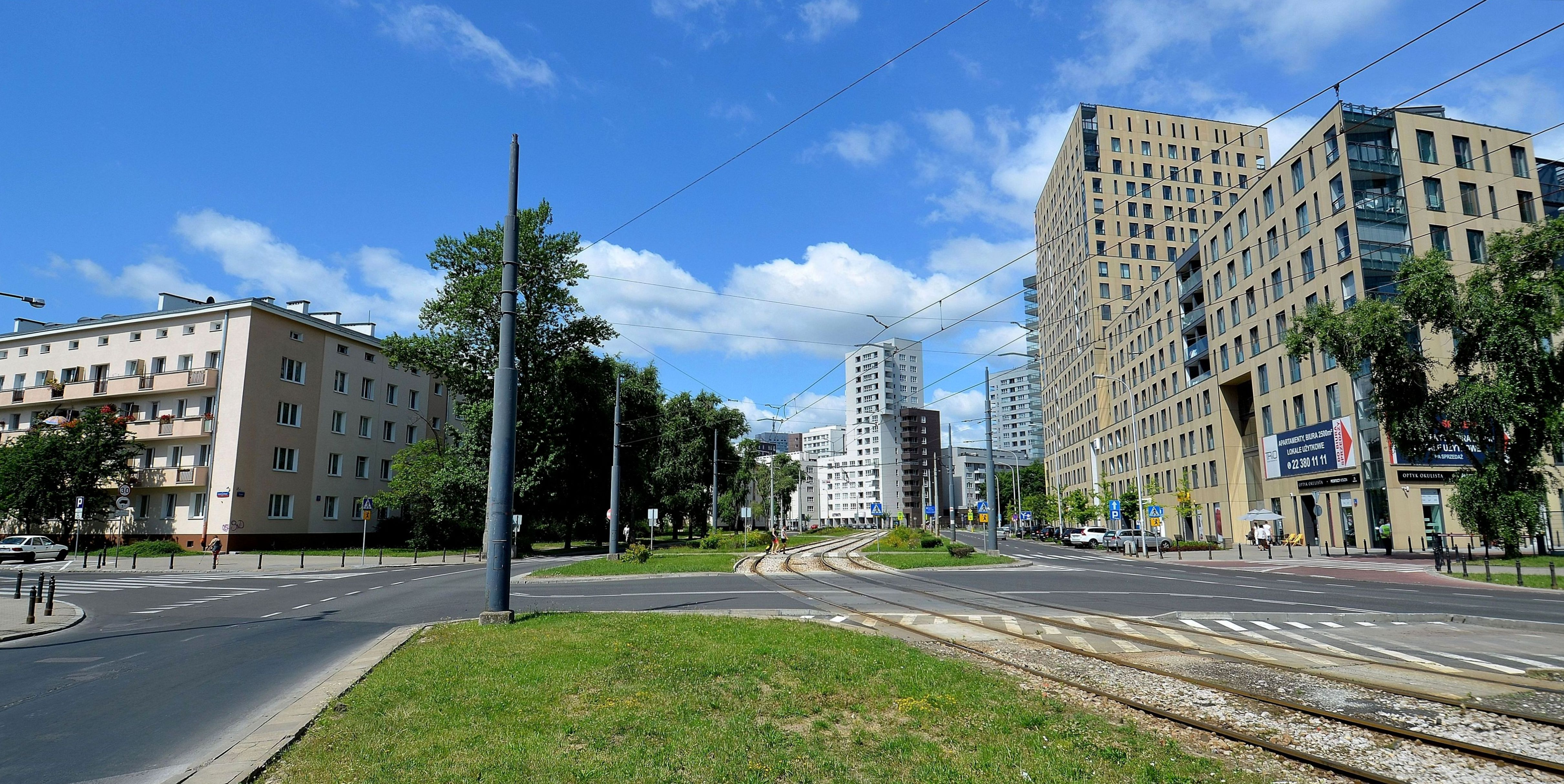
- Museum of History of Polish Jews; Stawki Street near Lewartowskiego Street

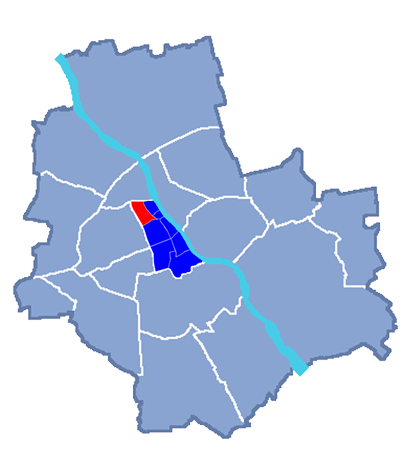
- Location of Muranów neighbourhood (red) in the District of Śródmieście, Warsaw (navy blue)

Muranów ([muˈranuf]) is a neighbourhood in the districts of Śródmieście (Downtown) and Wola in central Warsaw, the capital of Poland. It was founded in the 17th century. The name is derived from the palace belonging to Simone Giuseppe Belotti, a Venetian architect, who originally came to Warsaw from the island of Murano. It is the northernmost neighbourhood of the downtown area.

Muranów was once Warsaw's most multicultural, densely-populated and diverse precinct with historical architecture, bazaars, churches and synagogues. In the interwar period (1918–1939), the district was primarily inhabited by Jews. As a result, the Warsaw Ghetto was set up in Muranów in 1940 by the occupying Germans. After the ghetto uprising in 1943 commanded by Mordechaj Anielewicz, the district was completely destroyed. Only the sparse few buildings survived the war. Muranów was entirely redeveloped after the war into a socreal-modernist district with 1950s-1960s housing estates, tower blocks and, more recently, modern buildings and skyscrapers.

== History ==
=== 1700–1900 ===
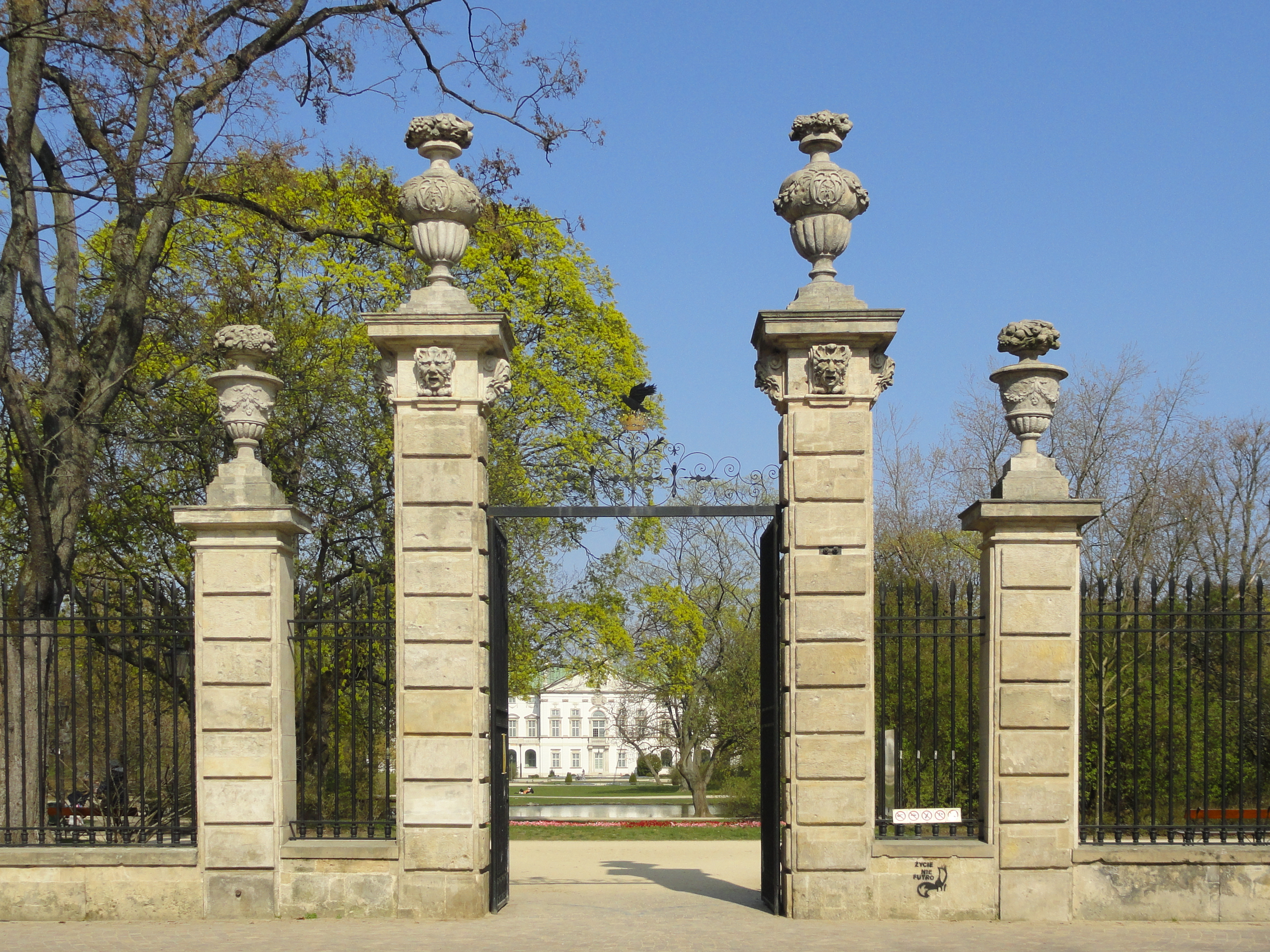
One of the few remaining landmarks of historical Muranów, a gate into the Krasiński Palace gardens from what was then Nalewki Street.

In 1686, Simone Giuseppe Belotti, an Italian architect working for kings Michael I and John III Sobieski, erected a small palace in what was then the countryside in the north of Warsaw. Belotti decided to name the estate Murano, after his native island near Venice.

In the subsequent decades, several independent settlements called jurydyka appeared in the vicinity of Belotti's residence. These self-governing exclaves attracted foreign settlers, initially Germans, and with time grew into small trading towns around Warsaw. The two most notable of these towns were Leszno and Nowolipie, now prominent streets in the Muranów neighbourhood. The houses were located on narrow lots along dirt roads aligned perpendicularly towards the Vistula. Contemporary urban layout of the area as well as several street names are the sole remainders of these towns.

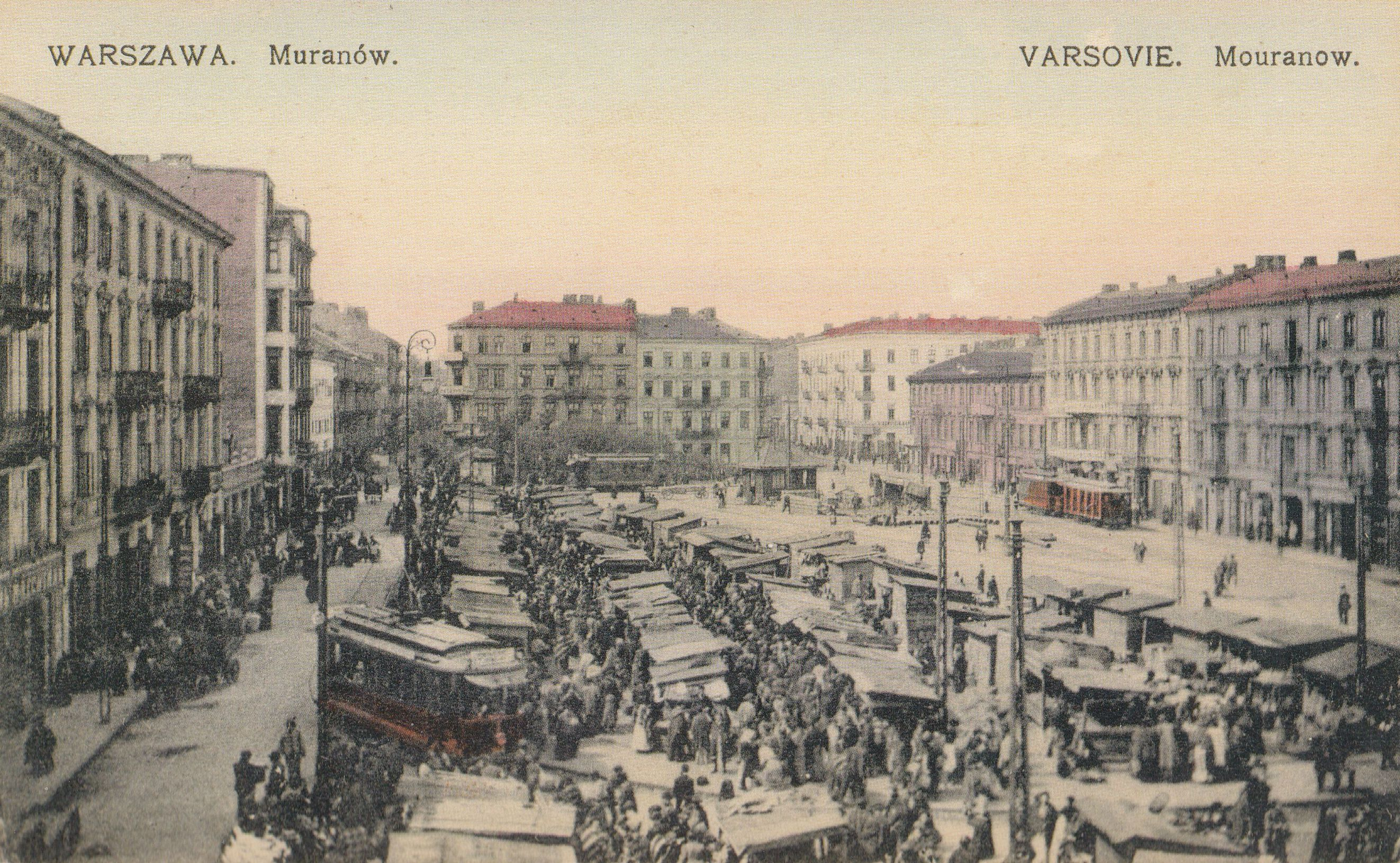
Muranowski Square, once the main square of the district, now there is an intersection of Stawki and Andersa Streets at this location

Throughout the 19th century, Jewish migrants from contemporary Lithuania and Belarus (then part of the Russian Empire) began settling in Muranów as the number of Jews living in the city centre was restricted; the incoming populations were subjected to segregation. It was then that the neighbourhood started to transform itself into a multicultural and socially excluded precinct like the East End of London. Hebrew, Yiddish and Russian were the most common foreign languages spoken in Muranów until the First World War (1914–1918). By this time, the architecture was dense and living conditions already lagged behind other central districts. Most of the population was poor or lower-middle class, whereas the poorest of Warsaw's inhabitants mostly concentrated around the Mariensztat, Powiśle and Solec neighbourhoods along the Vistula river, much like the London Docklands. The majority of buildings in Muranów were then residential dwellings, though little industrial facilities did exist among the houses. Most of Warsaw's heavy industry and factories were established in the western Wola district. The neighbourhood became infamous for petty crime and hosted two of Warsaw's most notable prisons – Pawiak and Serbia. Similarly to the East End in London, Muranów was marginalized by locals who pejoratively named it "The Northern Precinct" (dzielnica północna or strefa północna), a slang term synonymous with phrases such as the "Wild West" in the United States.

=== 1900–1939 ===
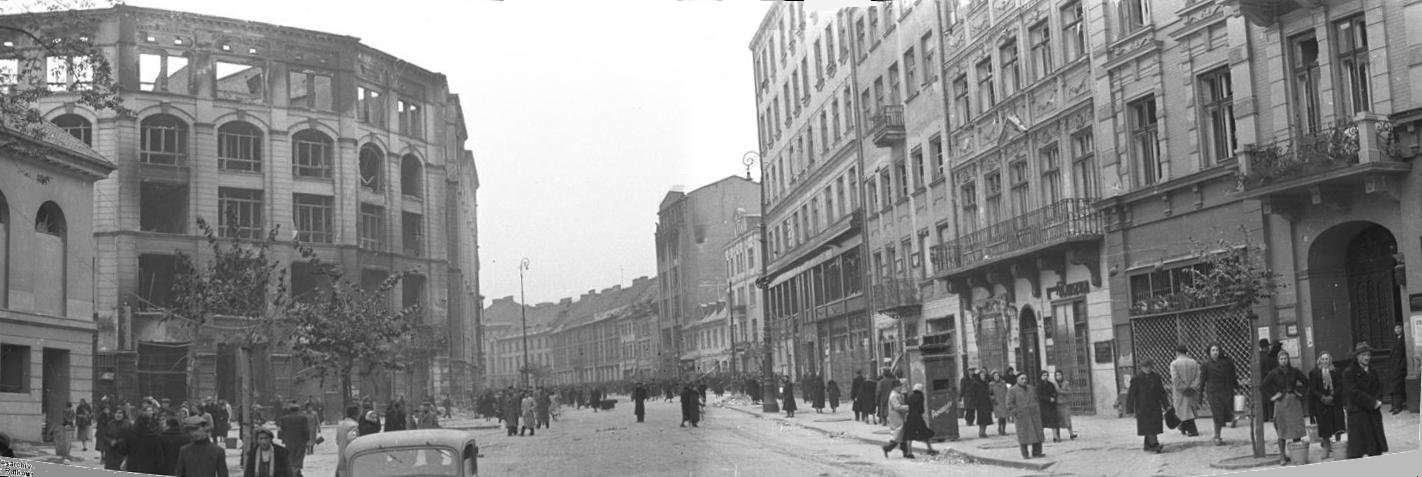
Burnt out buildings on Długa Street in 1939 after the invasion. Pasaż Simonsa is to the left.

Despite large disparities and an unfavourable reputation, the main representative streets of Muranów were aligned with richly decorated townhouses and tenements, mostly occupied by the wealthiest and most respected residents. There were several palaces scattered around and some remnants of the old Polish–Lithuanian Commonwealth which ceased to exist in 1795. "Plac Muranowski" (Muranów Square) was the commercial heart of the district, which was operated by an extensive tram network dating back as early as the invention of the electric tramcar. Horse trams running on rails were present before the inauguration of the electric line in 1908. The tram depot was built on the former site of Belotti's Murano Palace, which was demolished at the end of the 1800s to make way for future development. A modern commercial and shopping hall called "Pasaż Simonsa" was completed in 1903 on the intersection of Długa and Nalewki streets.

In the interwar period (1918–1939), around 90% of the population in Muranów was Jewish or of Jewish descent. Some of the major streets then included Stawki, Nowolipki, Żelazna, Miła, Dzielna, Długa, Pawia, Gęsia, Twarda and Chłodna. The Warsaw Jewish Cemetery on Okopowa Street was adjacent and de facto part of historical Muranów.

=== World War II ===
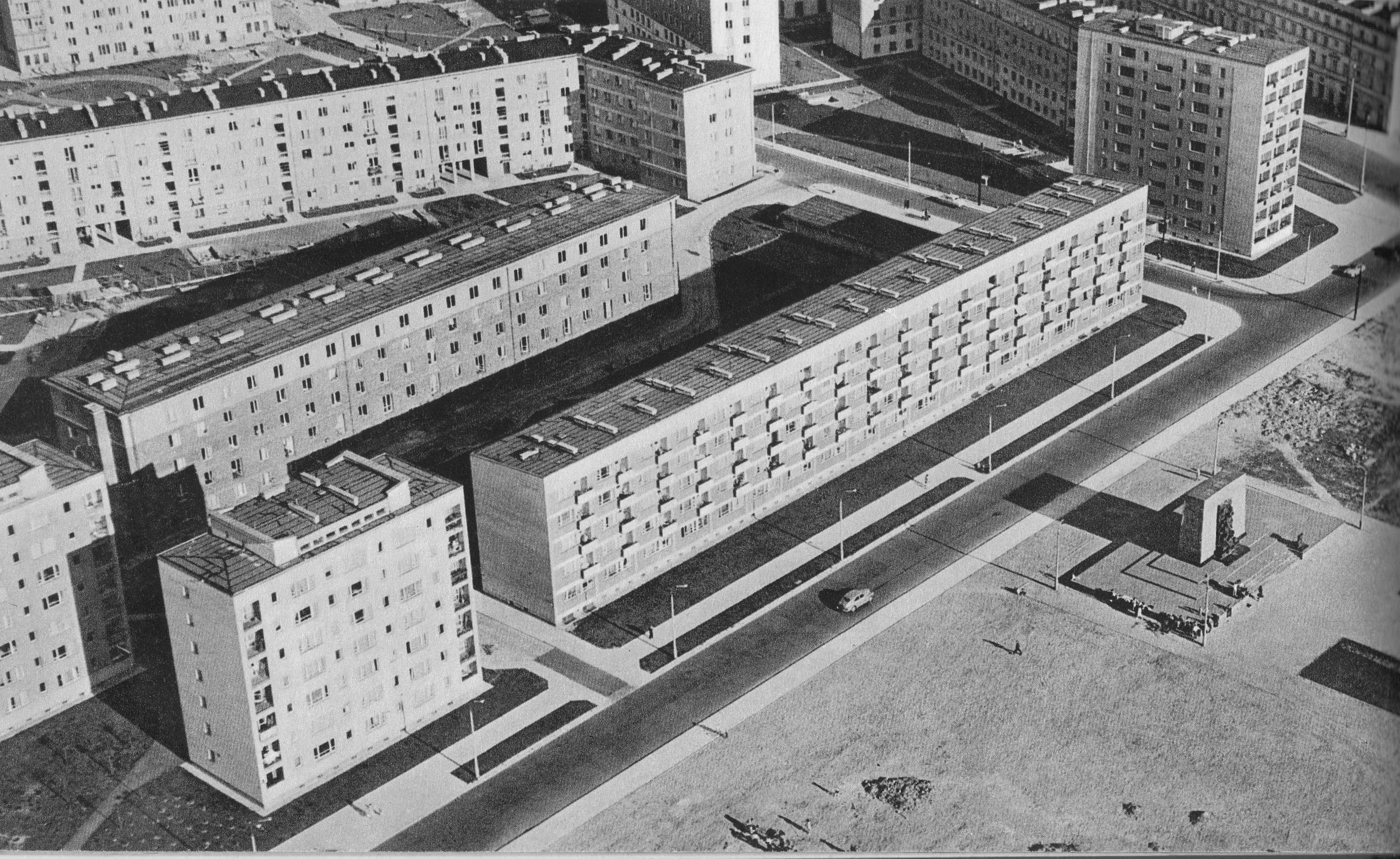
Housing estates and tower blocks in 1960s Muranów.

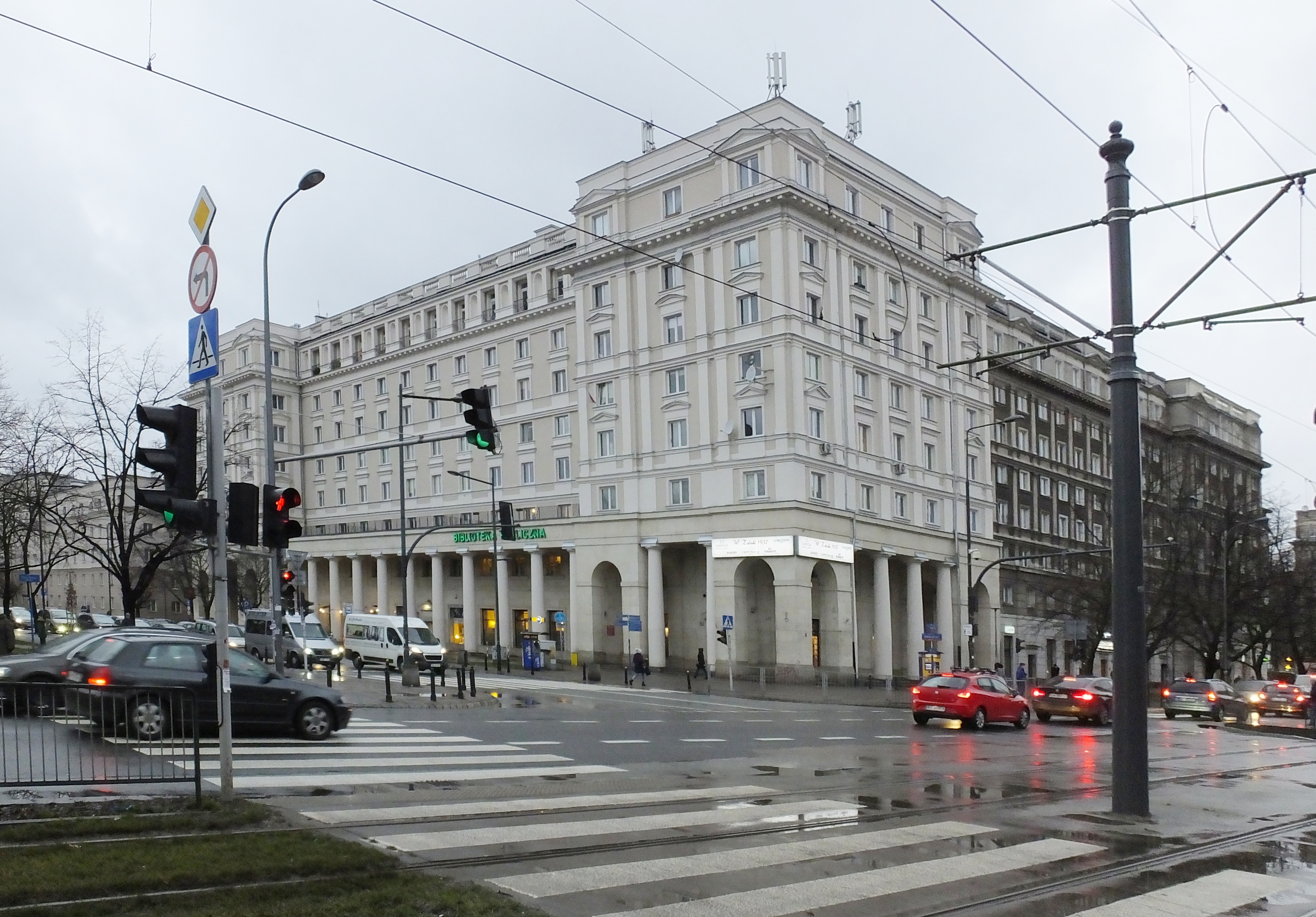
Post-war socreal-classicist architecture on Andersa Street.

During the Second World War, Muranów was almost immediately designated as a ghetto owing to its large Jewish population. Jews residing in other parts of the city were forced to move into the ghetto; in November 1940 Muranów was cut off from the rest of Warsaw and was fenced by a 3-meter (9.8 ft) brick wall topped with barbed wire. Approximately 92,000 individuals died in the ghetto as a result of disease, starvation and executions. The majority was sent to the extermination camp at Treblinka and some to Majdanek. In April of 1943, the Jews rebelled against the Germans in what became known as the Warsaw Ghetto Uprising. The Uprising was crushed and the Germans subsequently razed the ghetto to the ground, including Muranów. None of Muranów's most recognizable landmarks and architectural wonders remained standing with the exception of St. Augustine's Church, which was used as a watchtower, and the Jewish Cemetery. The intact ruins of the 18th-century Royal Artillery Barracks were demolished in 1965. Only a few pre-war buildings were reconstructed, like the Mostowski and Krasiński Palaces.

=== 1945–contemporary ===
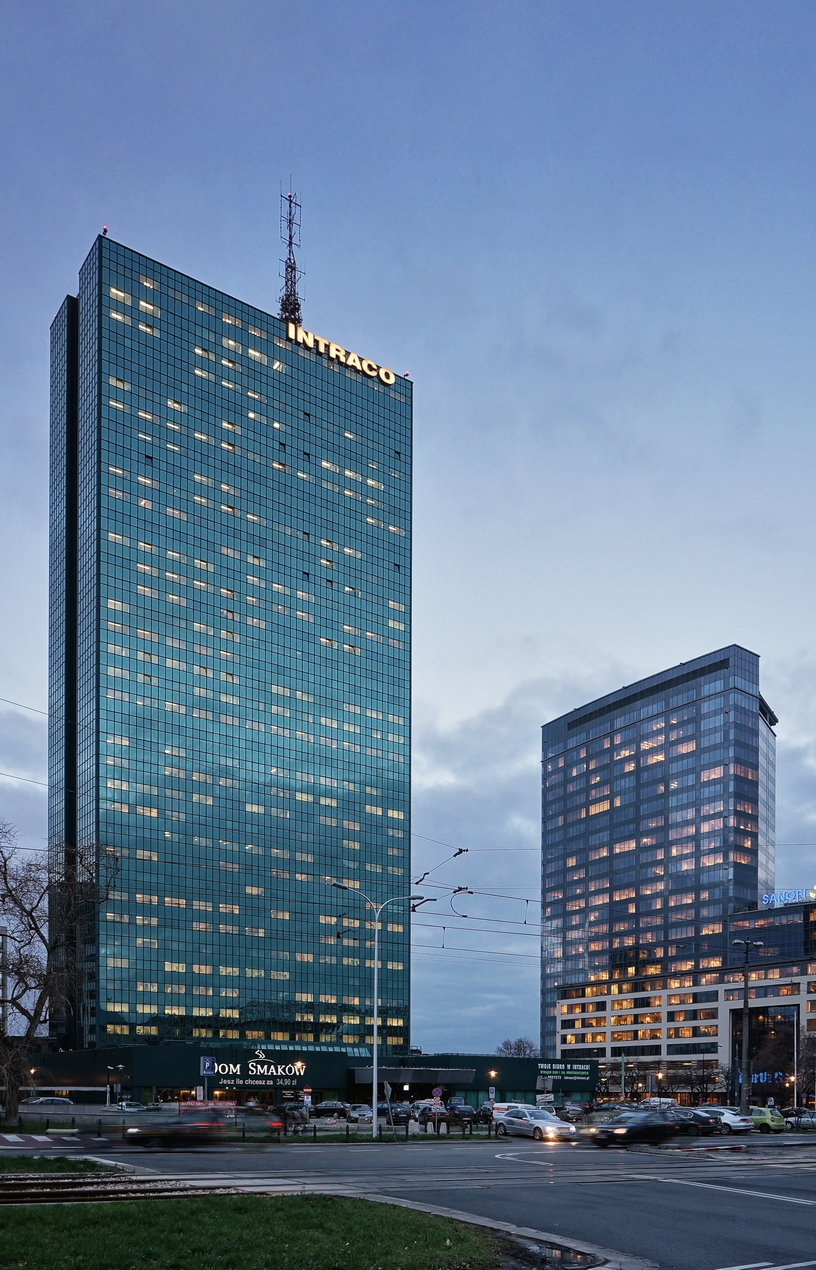
Intraco I skyscraper

Contemporary Muranów is a unique district, not only from the Polish perspective, since it is the only housing estate in the world located — intentionally — on the rubble of the Warsaw Ghetto and built in most part from this reconditioned rubble. It is the only urban design of such a scale in the capital of Poland from the 1950s, whose architects, inspired mostly by the pre-war modernism, also incorporated many features of socialist realism and classical architecture based on doctrine enforced by the communist government. Since 1989, the neighbourhood has undergone a significant transformation and modernization. Many zones in the suburb were cleared for new housing estates and skyscrapers.

In April 2013, the Museum of History of Polish Jews was opened at 6 Anielewicza Street.

== See also ==
- Żoliborz
- Solec, Warsaw
- Frascati, Warsaw
