= Śródmieście, Warsaw =

Central district of Warsaw, Poland

Śródmieście
- Warsaw district
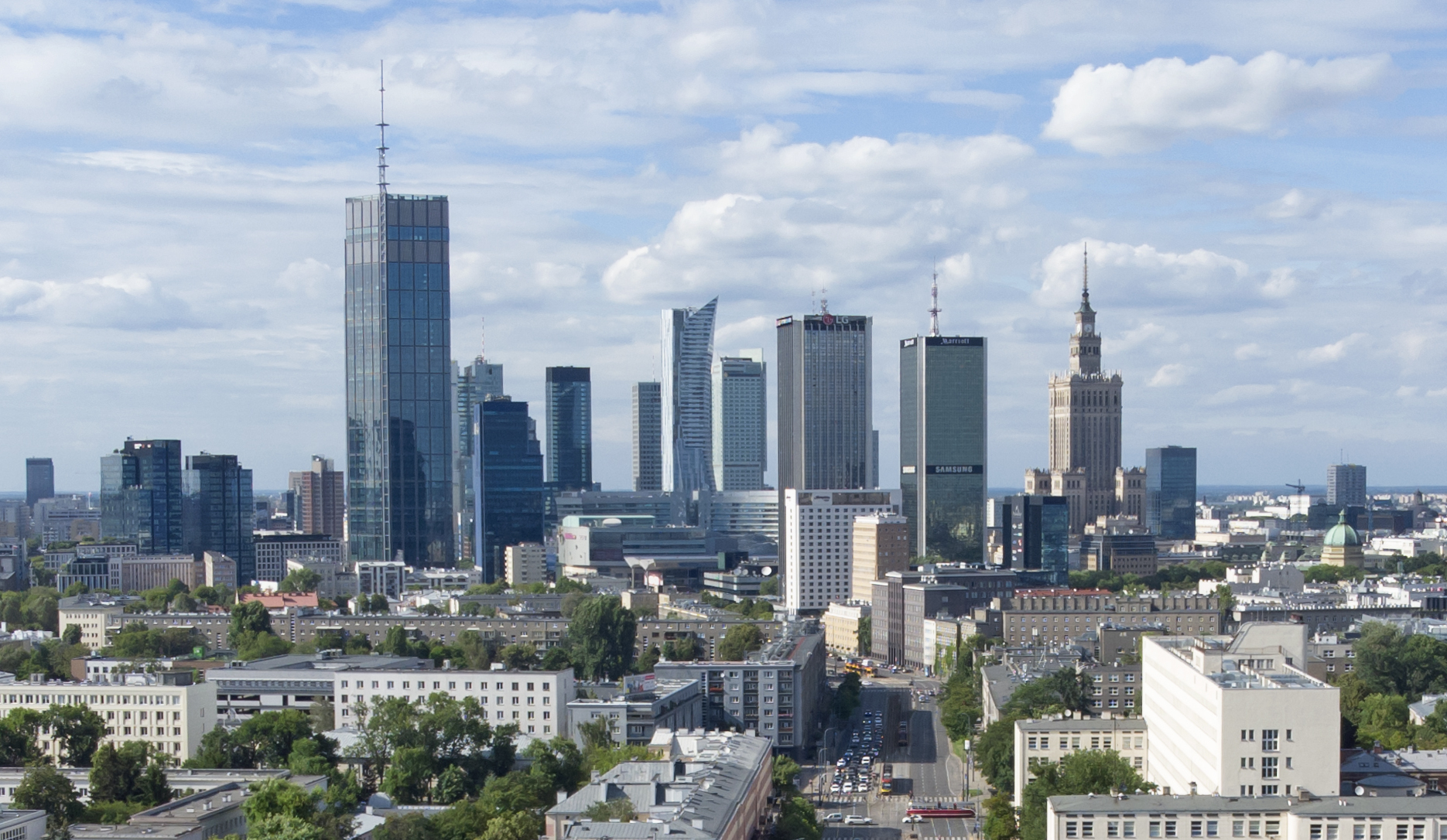
- The skyline of the Downtown district, as seen from the Independence Avenue.

- Location of Śródmieście within Warsaw

- Neighbourhoods of Śródmieście
- Coordinates: 52°14′N 21°01′E
- Country: Poland
- Voivodeship: Masovian
- City county: Warsaw

Government
  - Mayor: Aleksander Ferens (KO)

Area
  - Total: 15.57 km^{2} (6.01 sq mi)

Population (1 January 2023)
  - Total: 99,950
  - Density: 6,419/km^{2} (16,630/sq mi)
- Time zone: UTC+1 (CET)
  - Summer (DST): UTC+2 (CEST)
- Postal code: 00-xxx
- Area code: +48 22
- Website: srodmiescie.um.warszawa.pl

Śródmieście (Polish: [ɕrudˈmjɛɕ.t͡ɕɛ]), also anglicised as Downtown, is the central district of Warsaw, the capital city of Poland. It encompasses the Old Town, the city's historic core, and is the centre of cultural, commercial and political life of the capital.

== Geography ==
Located in the heart of Warsaw, it encompasses an area of approximately 15.57 km^{2} (6 sq mi). The district is characterized by its diverse landscape, which includes the Vistula River to the east, forming its natural border, and the historic Old Town at its core.

Śródmieście shares borders with four other districts: Żoliborz to the north, Wola to the west, Ochota to the south-west, and Mokotów to the south, making it a vital hub of urban activity in the capital city.

== Subdivisions ==
Śródmieście is subdivided into nine municipal neighbourhoods, each governed by the neighbourhood council. The current subdivision had been established on 10 March 2016.

Municipal neighbourhoods of Śródmieście
No.	Name	Council seat	City Information System areas
1	Muranów	9/11 Nowolipie Street	Muranów
2	Staromiejskie	17 Świętojańska Street, suite no. 9	New Town, Old Town, Muranów, North Downtown, Powiśle
3	Żelazna Brama		North Downtown
4	Centrum	19 Widok Street, suite no. 201	North Downtown
5	Powiśle-Skarpa	9 Ordynacka Street, suite no. 36	North Downtown, Powiśle
6	Koszyki	47 Jerusalem Avenue	South Downtown
7	Krucza	27 Jerusalem Avenue	South Downtown
8	Powiśle-Solec	12 Okrąg Street	Powiśle, Solec, South Downtown, Ujazdów
9	Oleandrów	1 Marszałkowska Street, suite no. 7	South Downtown, Ujazdów

The district is also subdivided into areas of the City Information System. Such subdivision was established in 1996. Those are:

- Muranów
- New Town (Nowe Miasto)
- North Downtown (Śródmieście Północne)
- Old Town (Stare Miasto)
- Powiśle
- Solec
- South Downtown (Śródmieście Południowe)
- Ujazdów

== Cityscape ==
=== Places of interest ===
- Warsaw Old Town
- Krasiński Palace
- POLIN Museum of the History of Polish Jews
- Pawiak
- Hale Mirowskie
- Nożyk Synagogue
- Presidential Palace
- Zachęta National Gallery of Art
- Saxon Garden
- Grand Theatre
- Palace of the Ministry of Revenues and Treasury
- Palace of Culture and Science
- Warszawa Centralna railway station
- Mokotów Field
- Łazienki Park
- Ujazdów Park
- Parliament of Poland
- National Museum
- Museum of Modern Art
- Copernicus Science Centre
- University of Warsaw Library
- Stadion Miejski

=== Bridges ===
- Gdańsk Bridge
- Silesian–Dąbrowa Bridge
- Holy Cross Bridge
- Poniatowski Bridge
- Łazienki Bridge

=== Streets and squares ===
- Castle Square
- Bank Square
- Foksal Street
- Grzybowski Square
- Iron-Gate Square
- Konstytucji Square
- Krasiński Square
- Piłsudski Square
- Theatre Square
- Three Crosses Square
- Warsaw Insurgents Square
- Saviour Square

== Education ==
The district is home to several prestigious educational institutions. Most notable among them are the University of Warsaw, Warsaw University of Technology, Chopin University of Music, Collegium Civitas, WSB University, Warsaw Aleksander Zelwerowicz National Academy of Dramatic Art, and the Academy of Fine Arts.

Schools include the Stefan Batory High School.

== See also ==
- Executions in Warsaw's police district
