= Żelazna Brama (neighbourhood) =

- Municipal neighbourhood
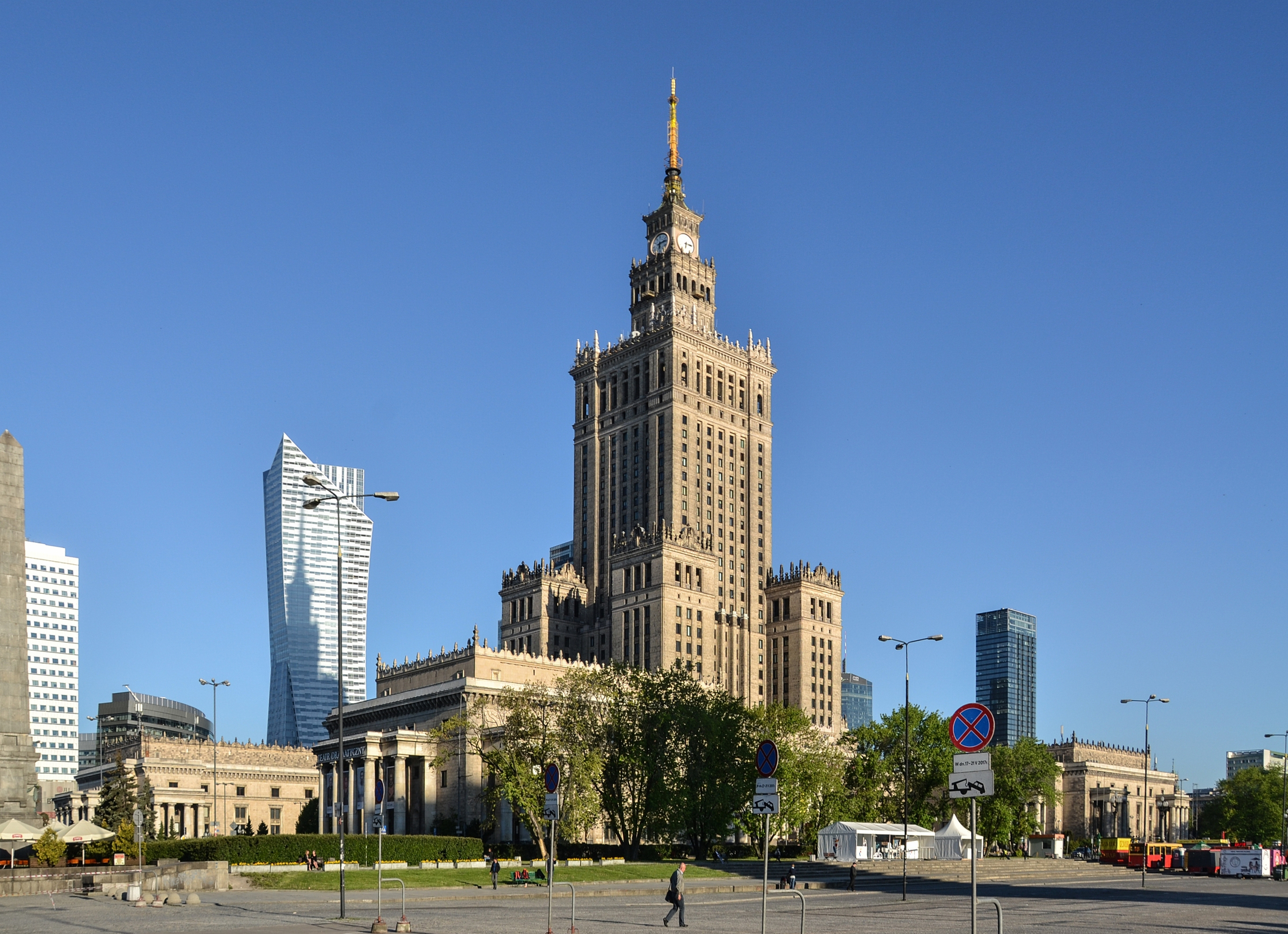
- The general view on Żelazna Brama neighbourhood, including the Palace of Culture and Science and Złota 44, in 2017.
- Interactive map of Żelazna Brama
- Coordinates: 52°14′13″N 21°00′06″E
- Country: Poland
- Voivodeship: Masovian Voivodeship
- City county: Warsaw
- District: Śródmieście
- City Information System areas: Śródmieście Północne
- Establishment: 10 March 2016

Government
  - Type: Neighbourhood council
- Time zone: UTC+1 (CET)
  - Summer (DST): UTC+2 (CEST)
- Area code: +48 22

Żelazna Brama, (Note: Translateion from Polish: Iron Gate) also designated as the Neighbourhood No. 3, (Note: Polish: Osiedle nr 3, Osiedle nr III) is a municipal neighbourhood of the city of Warsaw, Poland, located within the district of Śródmieście, and administered by a neighbourhood council. It is located within the City Information System area of Śródmieście Północne.

== Name ==
The name of the neighbourhood, Żelazna Brama, which means Iron Gate in Polish, comes from the Iron Gate, an entrance gate to the Saxon Garden, which from 1735 to the Second World War (1939–1945), was a notable landmark in the area.

== History ==
The municipal neighbourhood of Żelazna Brama was established on 10 March 2016.

== Government ==
The neighbourhood government is divided into two organs, the neighbourhood council as the legislative body, and the neighbourhood management as the executive body.

== Location and administrative boundaries ==
The neighbourhood boundaries are determined by Solidarity Avenue to the north, Bank Square, and Marszałkowska Street to the east, Jerusalem Avenue to the south, and Jana Pawła II Warsaw to the west. It is located within the City Information System area of Śródmieście Północne.
