= Ujazdów =

Neighbourhood in Warsaw, Poland

- Warsaw neighbourhood
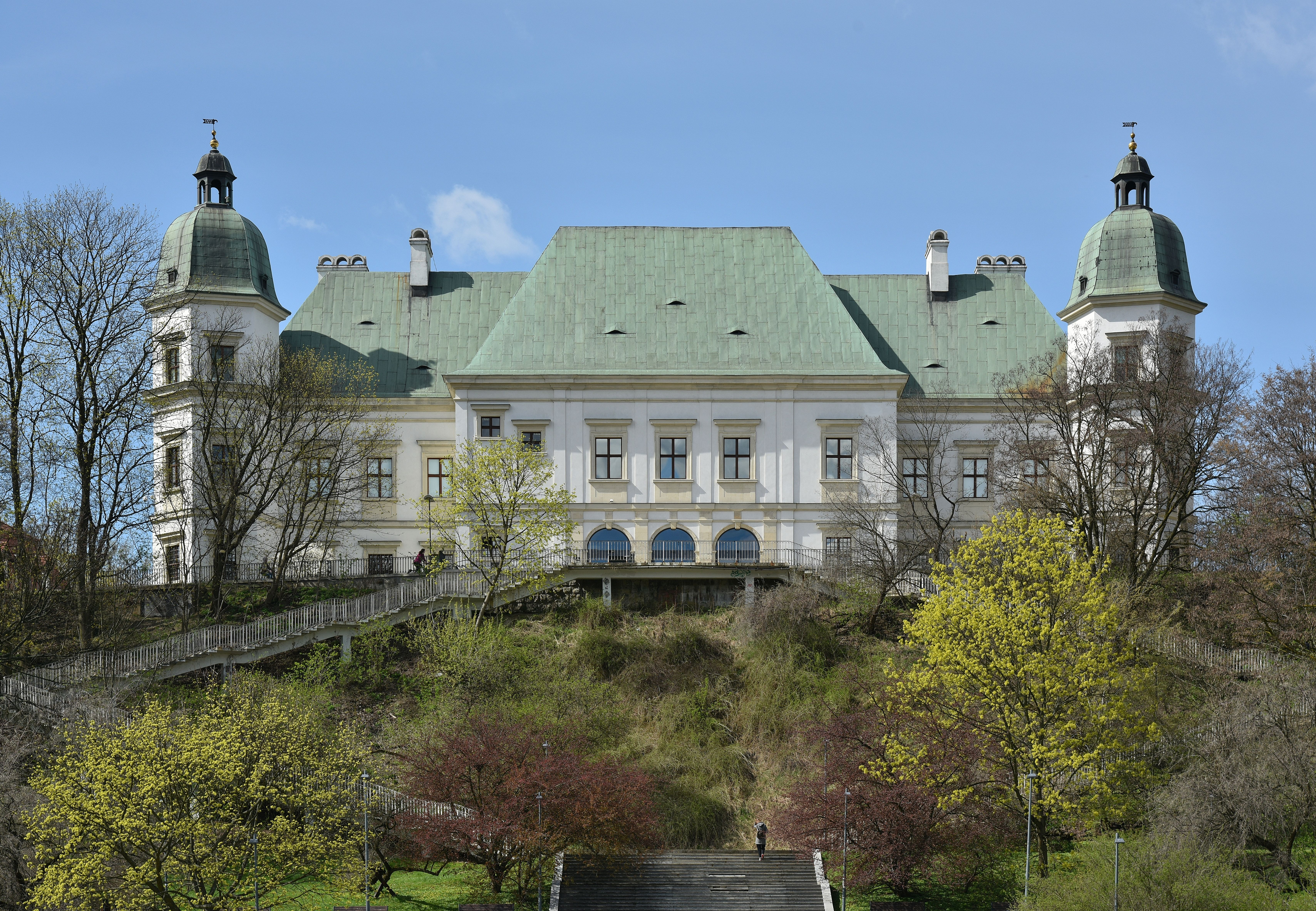
- Ujazdów Castle

- Location of Ujazdów neighbourhood (red) in the District of Śródmieście (navy blue)
- Coordinates: 52.2187°N 21.0380°E
- Country: Poland
- Voivodeship: Masovia
- City: Warsaw

Ujazdów (Polish pronunciation: [uˈjazduf]) is a prominent neighbourhood situated in central Warsaw, the capital of Poland. It is the southernmost part of the Downtown (Śródmieście) district, next to Solec and historical Frascati. The main thoroughfare passing through the neighbourhood is Ujazdów Avenue; the Chancellery of the Prime Minister of Poland, the Foreign Ministry and the Belweder Palace are located on or in the vicinity of the street. Ujazdów is an affluent neighbourhood, with villas, palaces and parks comprising most of its area. The most notable landmarks are the Łazienki Park and Palace on the Isle, the 18th century summer residence of Poland's last monarch Stanisław II Augustus.

== History ==
The name derives from a 13th-century defensive fort (gród) and manor called Jazdów which belonged to the Masovian Dukes; its purpose was to defend the nearby settlement of Solec, which was a significant place of trade and commerce on the Vistula river.

In 1262, the Grand Duke of Lithuania Mindaugas crossed the river with his troops and advanced towards Jazdów in an attempt to conquer Masovia. Duke Siemowit I and his oldest son, Konrad II, who were in Jazdów on a visit, prepared for a siege of the fortress whilst awaiting rescue from allies. However, the townsfolk betrayed the Duke and Mindaugas' troops managed to enter the fortress on 23 June 1262. According to most records, Siemowit I was killed by beheading during battle (or soon after) with the Lithuanians and Ruthenians. Konrad was captured and imprisoned, but released after two years. In 1281, the fort was abandoned and its inhabitants moved to a newly established settlement near present-day Old Town which gave rise to the city of Warsaw decades later. Archaeological excavations to determine the exact location of the previous fort proved futile.

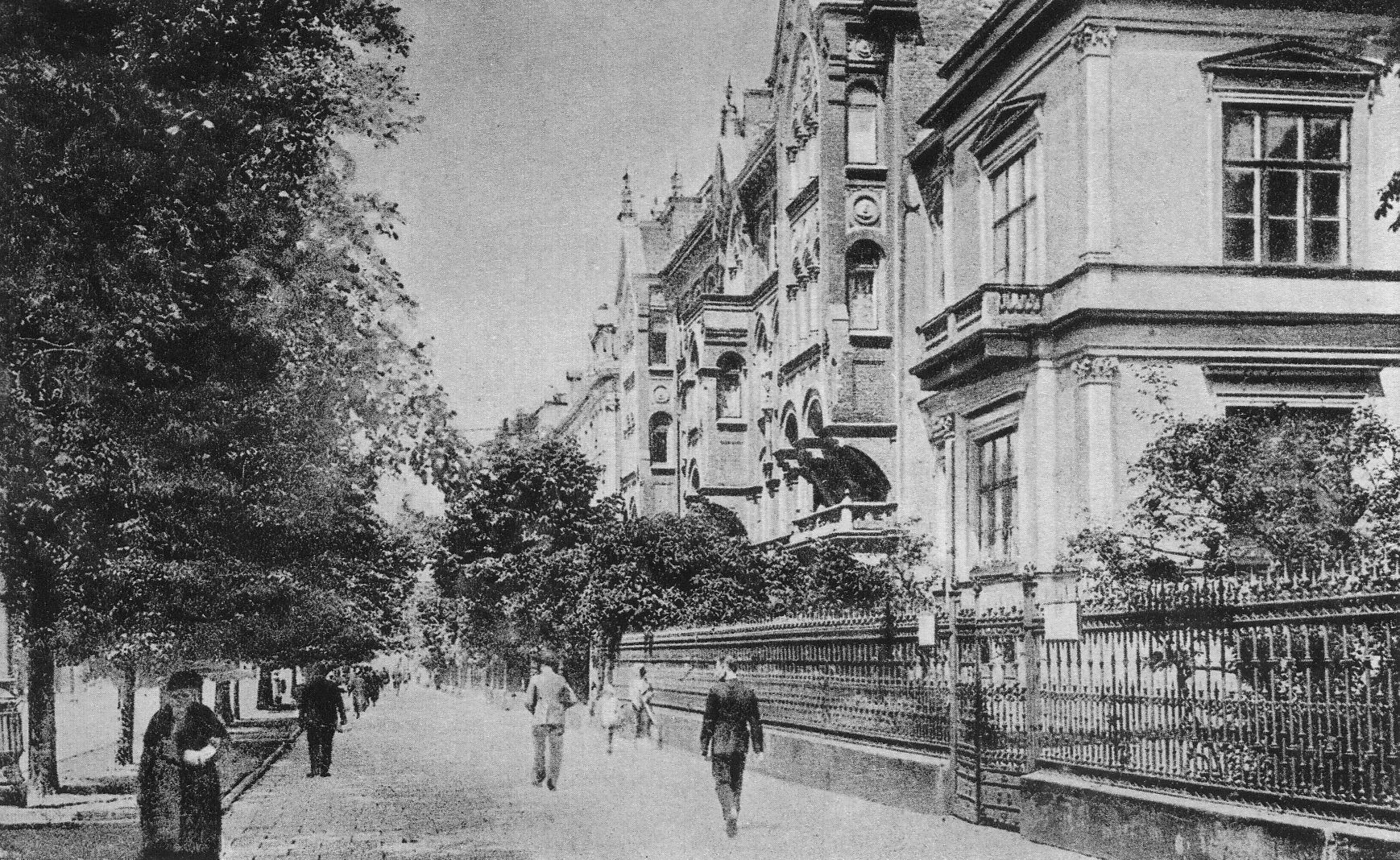
Ujazdów Avenue before 1939

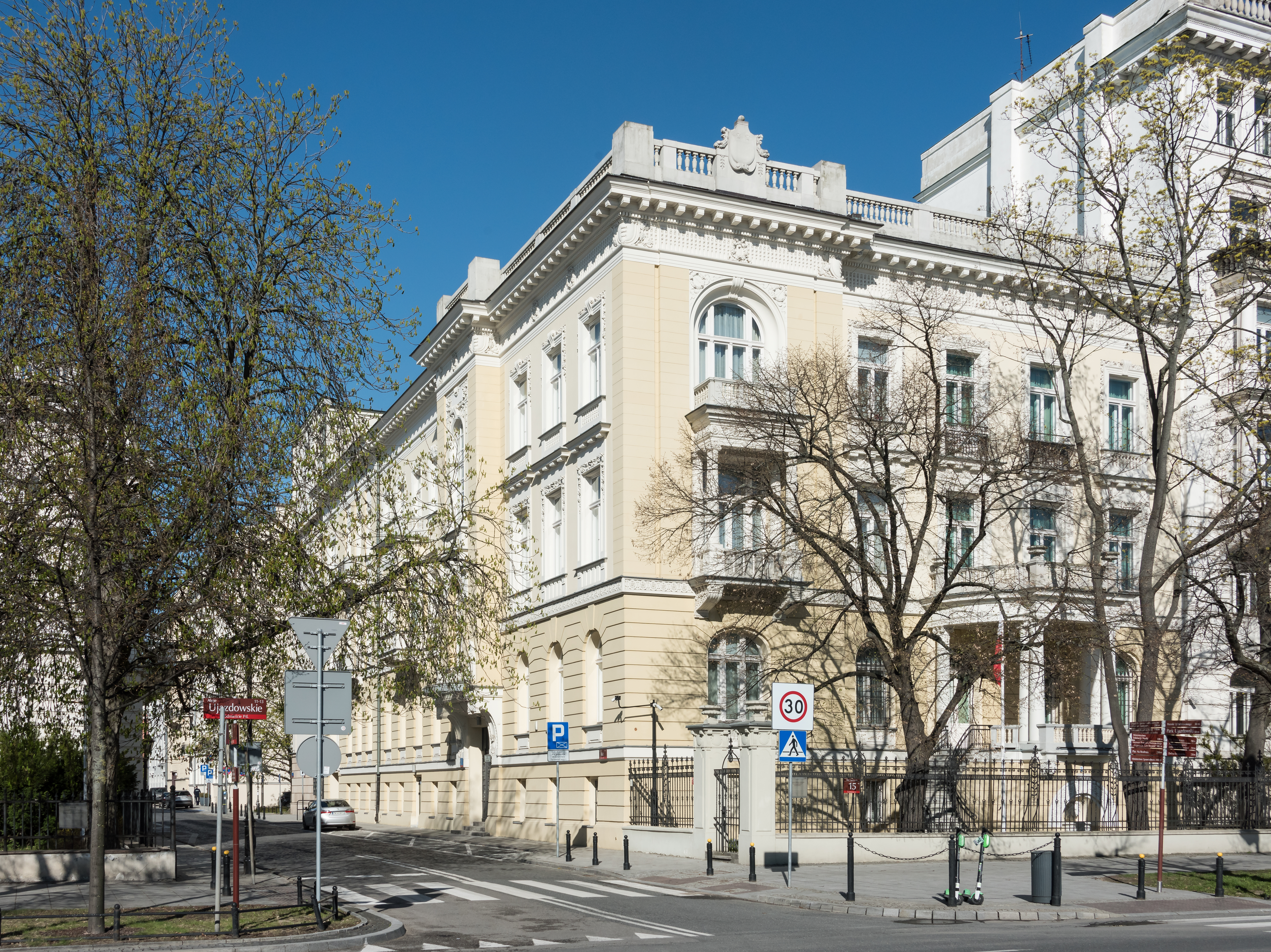
Ujazdów Avenue now

The Duchy of Masovia became part of the Polish Kingdom in 1526 after the abrupt death of Janusz III. Bona Sforza, the Italian wife of Sigismund I, was suspected of poisoning the duke to annex the duchy, though no real evidence exists. Following the annexation of Warsaw and its surroundings, Queen Bona ordered the construction of a presumably wooden manor with a large forest-like park and a menagerie. On 12 January 1578, Jan Kochanowski's blank-verse tragedy The Dismissal of the Greek Envoys premiered at Ujazdów during the wedding of Jan Zamoyski and Krystyna Radziwiłł. The residence was demolished by king Sigismund III who ordered the construction of Ujazdów Castle on its site. The castle was completed in 1624 and now houses the Museum of Modern Art.

The forested area of Ujazdów closer to the river was designated by Stanisław II Augustus as a Baths Park (Polish: Łazienki), with a private palace obtained from nobleman Stanisław Herakliusz Lubomirski. The chateau was reconstructed in a neoclassical style in the middle of a pond, earning it the names "Palace on the Isle" and "Palace on the Water". It is one of Warsaw's most recognizable landmarks.

Up until the 19th century, Ujazdów remained more of a city periphery with smaller-scale dwellings and mansions belonging to aristocrats. It was also a summer retreat for Warsaw's wealthier and upper classes. In 1896, the Ujazdów Park became open to the public.

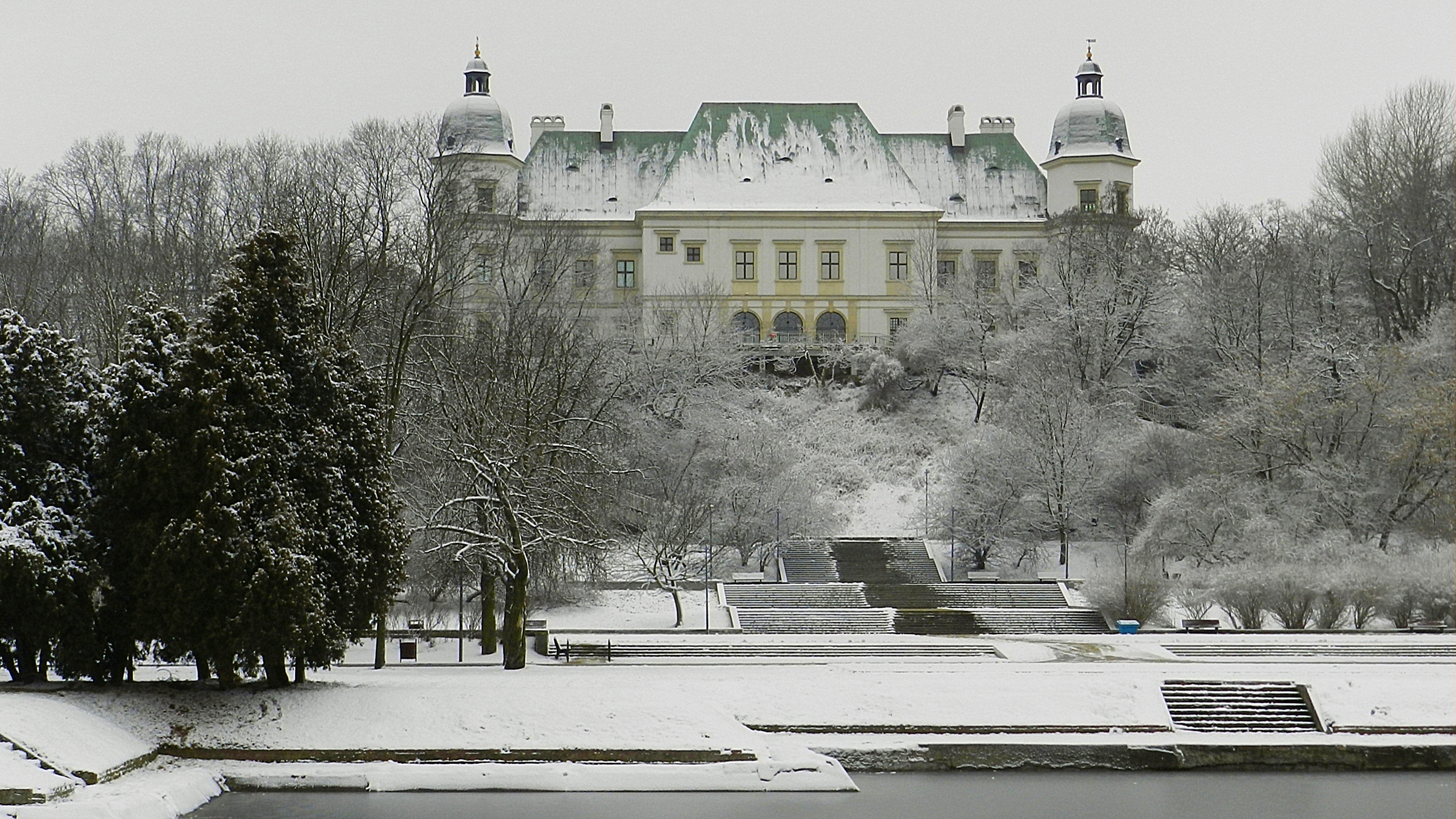
Ujazdów Castle and Piaseczno Canal in winter

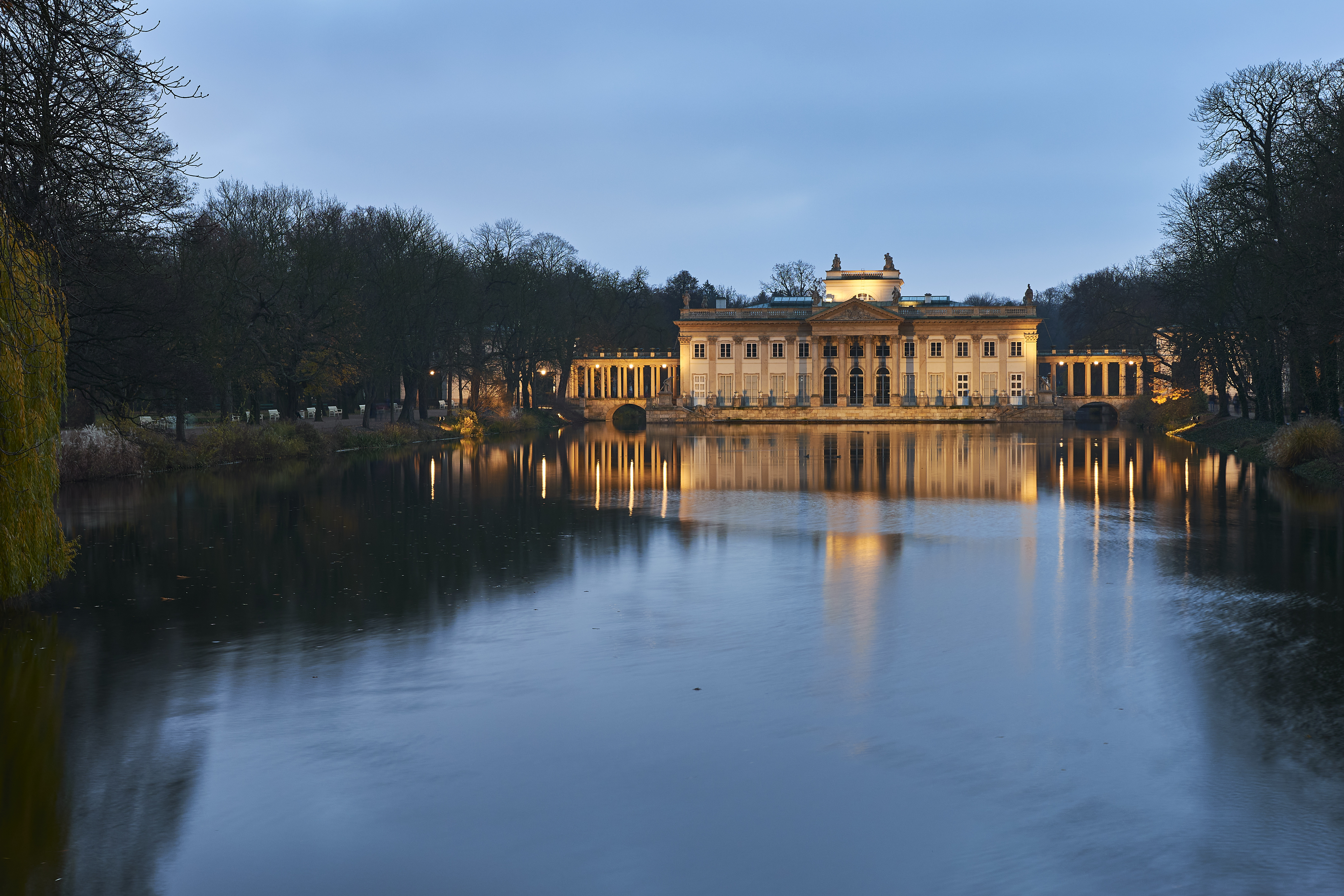
Palace on the Isle at dusk

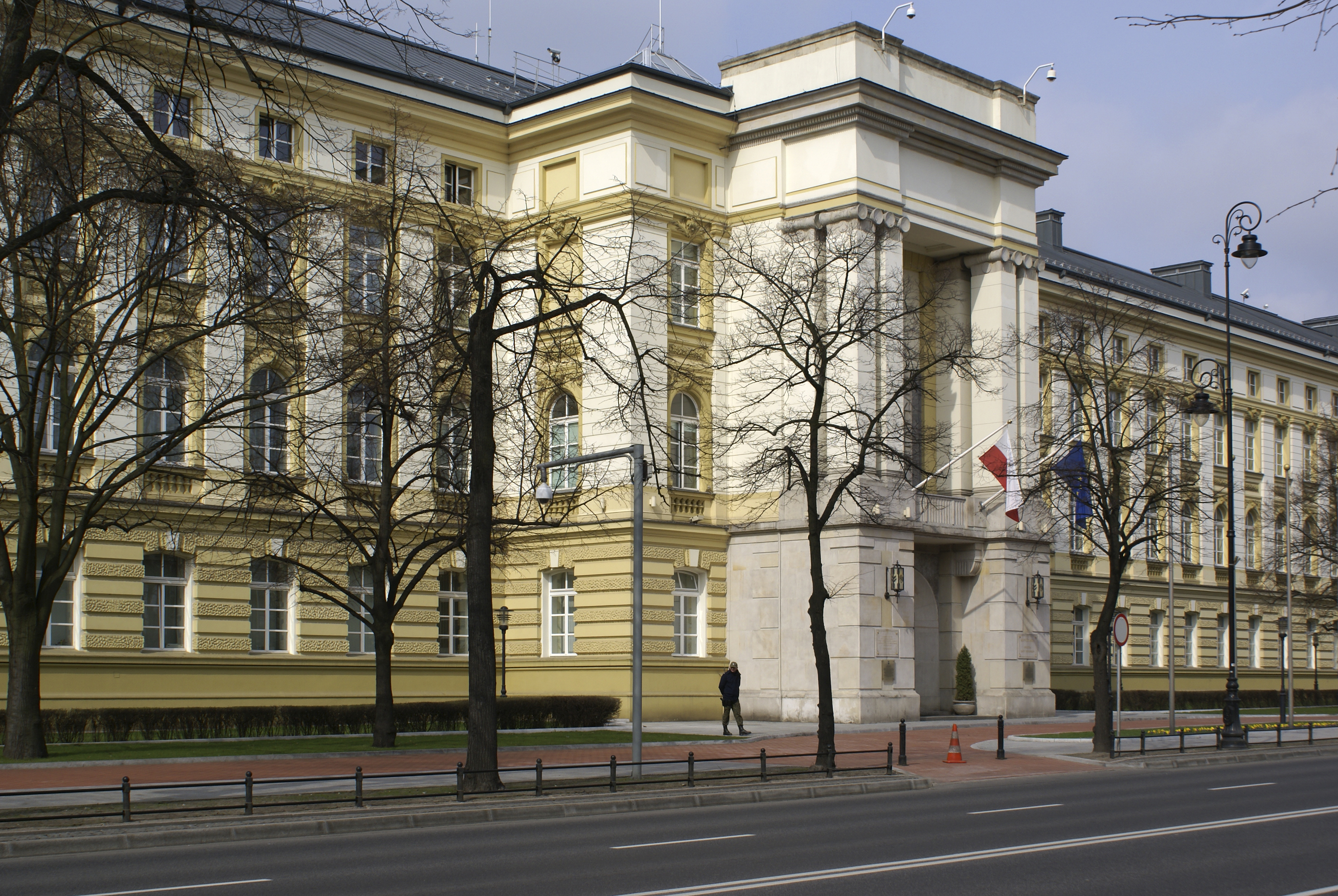
Chancellery on Ujazdów Avenue

Ujazdów did not suffer major destruction unlike the rest of Warsaw during World War II as it was designated as a neighbourhood for Nazi officials and German settlers. Many of Warsaw's finest and most historic buildings outside the Old Town are situated in Ujazdów and the adjacent Southern Downtown (Śródmieście Południowe) district.

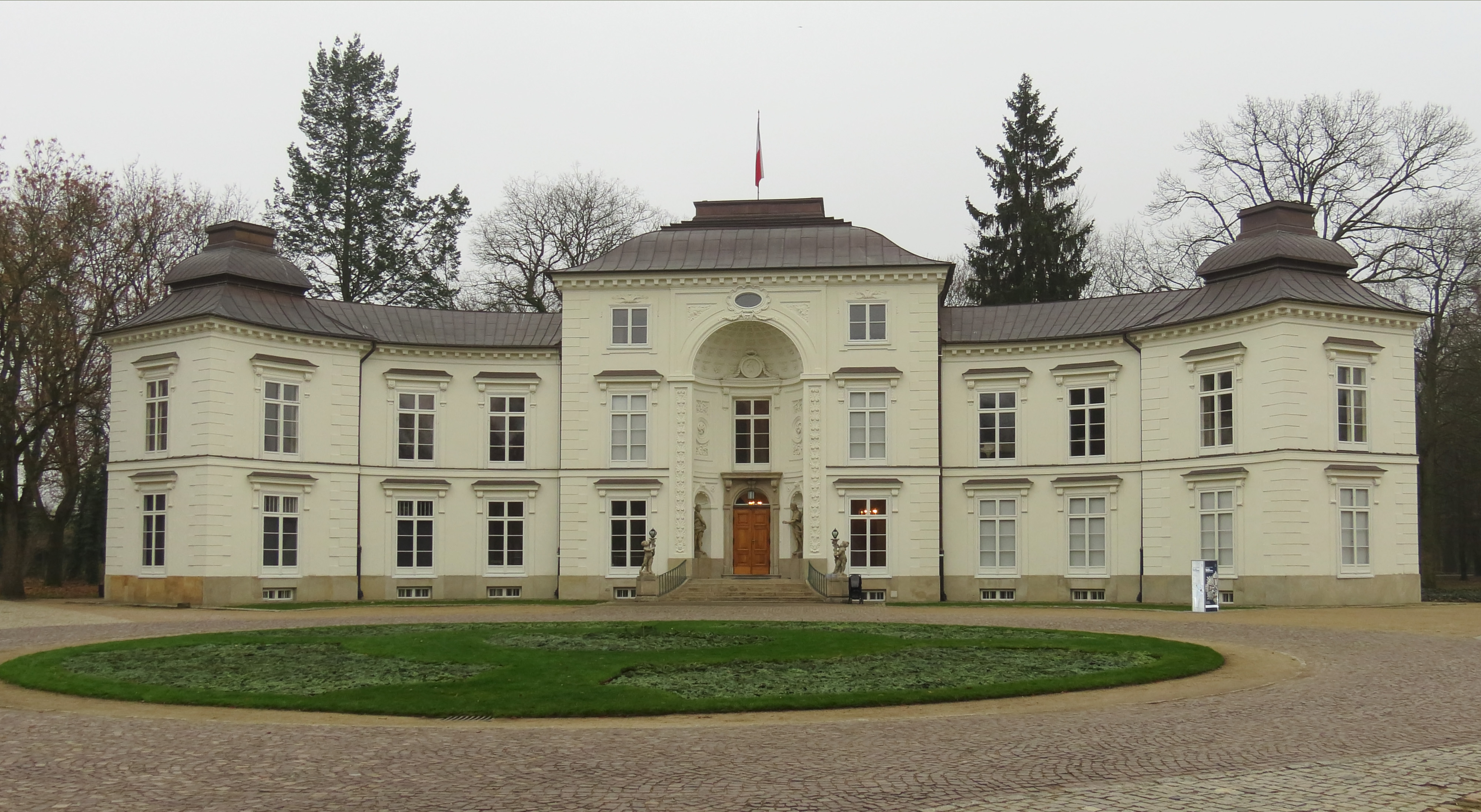
Myślewicki Palace

== Sites ==
- Ujazdów Park
- Ujazdów Castle and Piaseczno Canal
- Łazienki Park
- Myślewicki Palace, visited by Napoleon Bonaparte and Richard Nixon
- Palace on the Isle, summer residence and retreat of king Stanisław II Augustus.
- New Orangery (Łazienki), part of the palatial park complex.
- Belweder, one of the official residences of the President of Poland.
- Ujazdów Avenue, the main street aligned with historical tenements.
- Colony of Embassies, foreign consulates and diplomatic missions to Poland
- Colony of "Finnish Houses", built in 1945 for the members of the committee responsible for the post-war reconstruction of Warsaw.
- Chancellery of the Prime Minister, headquarters of the Polish government alike the Sejm
- Ministry of Foreign Affairs
- Constitutional Tribunal Building
- Ministry of Justice
- Warsaw Observatory

== See also ==
- Frascati
- Solec
- Mariensztat
- Wola
- Ochota
- Mokotów
