= Powiśle, Warsaw =

Neighborhood in Warsaw, Poland

Coordinates: 52.2374°N 21.0295°E

Powiśle
- Warsaw neighborhood
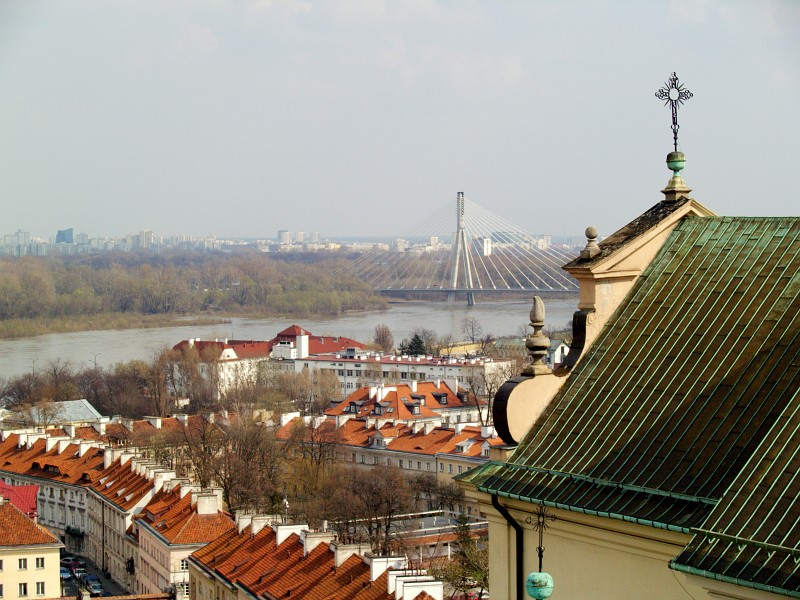
- View from St. Anne's Church towards the Holy Cross Bridge, looking over Mariensztat

- Location of Powiśle neighborhood (red) in the district of Śródmieście (navy blue)

Powiśle (Polish pronunciation: [pɔˈviɕlɛ]; literally along-the-Vistula) is a neighbourhood in Warsaw's borough of Śródmieście (Downtown). It is located between the Vistula river and its escarpment. Historically, it is composed of three neighbourhoods: central Powiśle, Mariensztat to the north (just below the Warsaw's Old Town) and Solec to the south.

In the 17th and 18th centuries the area was mostly inhabited by the poor. Little changed in the 19th century when the neighbourhood became slightly industrialized. It retained the character of a city slum until its almost complete destruction during the Warsaw Uprising of 1944. It was inhabited by the unemployed and craftsmen of all types, factory and port workers, smiths, coalers, sand vendors, fishermen and prostitutes. As such it was similar in character to London Docklands.

After the war, the area became partially rebuilt and the area of Mariensztat became the first neighbourhood of Warsaw to be reconstructed. Currently there are plans to turn the area into the Warsaw University campus, a notion that was already started by the construction of the Warsaw University Library and several faculties there.
