= Community management =

Community management or common-pool resource management is the management of a common resource or issue by a community through the collective action of volunteers and stakeholders. The resource managed can be either material or informational. Examples include the management of common grazing and water rights, fisheries, and open-source software. In the case of physical resources, community management strategies are frequently employed to avoid the tragedy of the commons and to encourage sustainability.

It is expected that community management allows for the management, usually of natural resources, to come from members of the community that these decisions will affect. This should allow for a better way of finding solutions that the community will find most effective since management styles are not always transferable across different regions; and this could be because of cultural, economic, or geographical differences. It is expected that the group members within this setting have the incentive to do the best they can for the community because they live in the community that benefits or suffers from the management they provide. By decentralizing the management of resources, it is also expected that the upkeep that occurs within the services provided is streamlined due to the direct link between the areas that need improvement or regular maintenance and the authority overseeing them. However, these expected benefits of community management are not what we see unfolding within communities that follow this management style.

== Common pool problem ==
Without proper management, a community's material resources may be depleted or rendered unusable. The common pool problem is an economic situation which exists when goods are rival, but non-exclusive (See common-pool resource). Since these resources are owned in common, individuals have no private incentive to preserve them, but rather will seek to exploit them before others can derive benefit. The classic example is of fish in the ocean; anybody can harvest fish, but a fish that has been caught cannot be caught by another fisherman. Therefore, fishermen will seek to maximize their personal profit by catching as many fish as possible, which will ultimately lead to the stock being depleted. It is similar to the free rider problem in that those who do not contribute to the resource may use it without penalty, but the common pool problem is usually considered an economic "problem" since it will eventually lead to the exhausting of a resource. Another example of the common pool problem involves the shared use of limited internet bandwidth, such as in a university network, when the connectivity of all users is slowed by the heavy usage of a few.

Elinor Ostrom and Oliver E. Williamson won the 2009 Nobel prize in economic science for work in this area, where they suggested that with good community management of shared resources, as found in successful firms, the "tragedy of the commons" can be avoided.

Expanding on the foundational work of Ostrom, Roland Perez (2010) observes that the recognition of her research marked a departure from the "presumptive superiority" of both private property and state-led management. According to Perez, Ostrom's findings relativize the conclusions of earlier theories by highlighting the contingency of governance modes; the success of a community-managed system is not a given, but is instead deeply tied to the technical, political, and cultural characteristics of the specific environment. This perspective suggests that there is no universal "blue-print" for collective action.

Furthermore, the "Bloomington School" methodology—which combines multi-actor game modeling with deep anthropological analysis—offers a "third way" known as polycentric governance. This approach encourages the establishment of "rules-in-use" that are developed by the community members themselves rather than imposed by a central authority. This nuanced understanding is particularly applicable to contemporary "anthropized ecosystems" and modern digital shared resources, where independent regulation allows for a more flexible response to complex institutional challenges.

== Shared information resources ==
Developing open-source software or other collaborative projects such as Wikipedia generally requires some form of community management, whether it involves leadership or egalitarianism. Unlike as is the case with physical resources, the sharing of information does not necessarily deplete the resource. Nonetheless, proper management may be necessary to encourage a network effect, where collaborative use actually enriches the resource, and to avoid conflict.

More generally, community management designates the activity of maintaining communication, motivation, efficiency, and engagement among a group of remote individuals often only linked together by the Internet. Typically, it will contribute to the success of an open-source initiative by keeping forums alive with information, questions, and challenges, by organizing real-life events for virtual communities, or by organizing contests or hackathons to focus all efforts on a common goal. It may also be used to improve motivation and synergy in a large organization (such as a company or a public organization) by creating a sense of belonging and ensuring that members are aware of each other's work. Community management requires human skills (a community manager) and the use of tools (e.g., social networks, instant messaging, resource sharing, etc.).

== Problems with Community Management ==
Community management has been a popular strategy utilized in African water management, but research has shown that Africans often don't prefer this management style. Main problems of community management, specifically related to water management, consist of potential maintenance issues, population issues, money collecting issues, and a lack of community engagement.

- Community management can create potential maintenance issues that are resolved with less expediency and with less efficiency. This often stems as a result of having a lack of a qualified person to perform the repair or lacking a reliable way to collect money in order to hire someone to do the repair.
- Money collecting issues are a main problem in poorer areas. If not, everyone is paying a fee to use the resources in question, then there won't be any money to make repairs when needed. This includes not paying and a lack of an efficient way to pay fees. People will not go out of their way to pay fees so a solid collection strategy is needed.
- General user fees within community managed water supply systems have been found to be not enough to keep the service operational let alone make repairs when needed. Even if citizens have the capacity to pay fees it has been found that many people simply don't want to. It is suggested that health concerns about clean drinking water are not enough to create a population of users who are willing to pay user fees let alone maintenance fees when needed.
- Population issues can also cause problems because community management is often more effective on a smaller scale. In other words, communities with smaller populations have an easier time developing effective systems like citizen participation, money collection, or maintenance repairs simply because it is easier to combat the problems that arrive within those areas when there is a smaller group of people affected that need help.
- A lack of community engagement is a chronic issue that arises within community management, as well. In order for community management to be an effective strategy of management style the community must be engaged within the management system in order to reap the community benefits. Despite this, most citizens are not interested in the issues community management organizations are looking to improve, meaning these organizations are getting less input from the community which negates the point of community management.

== Methods of management ==
A community may itself be actively developed and managed in order to promote communal activity and welfare.

In some cases, the task of managing a physical resource may be delegated to a specialist professional called a community manager. Meaning members of the community are involved in the development and follow through of community development projects, which can involve acquiring the funding for projects as well as deciding what plans would be beneficial for the community and which ones would not.

Malawi is an example of the utilization of community management to provide water access to citizens. Malawi is a poor area that with recent governmental pushes for decentralization has led to water management becoming a community responsibility. Within Malawi boreholes are used to access water and each of these boreholes is under the control of a committee which delegates a manager for each borehole. These managers receive initial training from an official district water officer but are then left to make their own decisions regarding the upkeep of the borehole. This training has been found to be ineffective in many cases so the work of area mechanics, who are more knowledgeable about these boreholes, are often utilized to perform repairs. However, these area mechanics are not accessible everywhere and require additional payments. Payment is also something that is irregularly collected which has created a lack of funds for repairs.

In the case of internet resources, the privileging of certain kinds of data transfer may ensure a better overall quality of service for most users, as opposed to the doctrine of network neutrality.

== See also ==
- Sustainable development
- Resource management
