= Palace of the Minister of Treasury =

Historic palace in Warsaw, Poland

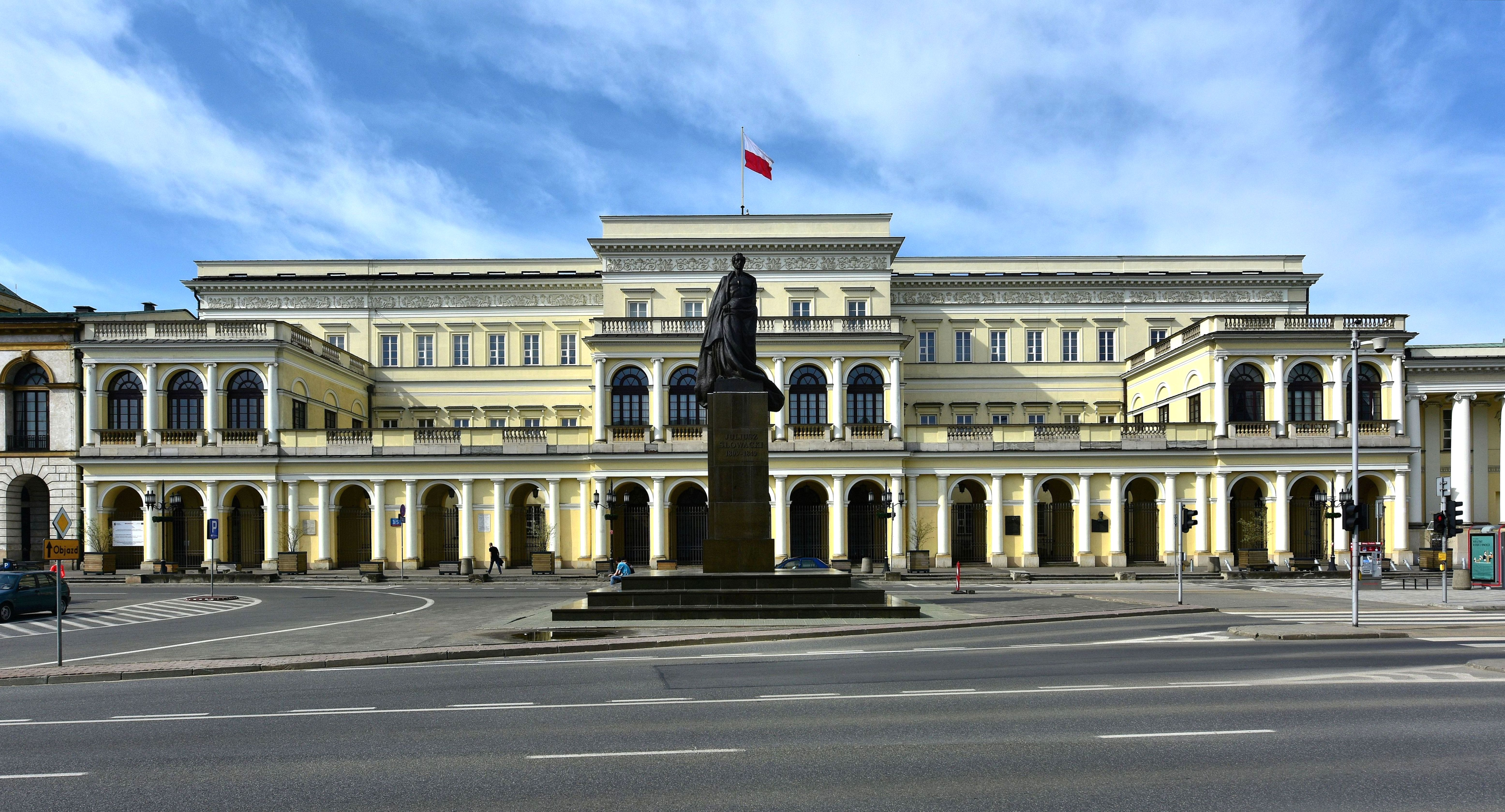
- The palace and the statue of Juliusz Słowacki in 2018.
- Interactive map of the Palace of the Minister of Treasury area

General information
- Type: Palace, town hall
- Architectural style: Neoclassical
- Location: Downtown, Warsaw, Poland, 3 and 5 Bank Square
- Coordinates: 52°14′31.33″N 21°00′08.08″E
- Construction started: 1825
- Completed: 1830

Technical details
- Floor count: 3

Design and construction
- Architect: Antonio Corazzi

The Palace of the Minister of Treasury (Polish: Pałac Ministra Skarbu) is a neoclassical palace in Warsaw, Poland, located at 3 and 5 Bank Square, within the North Downtown neighbourhood. It houses the Masovian Voivodeship Sejmik, and together with nearby Palace of the Government Commission of Revenues and Treasury, forms the city hall complex and office of the mayor. The building was designed by Antonio Corazzi, and opened in 1830.

== History ==
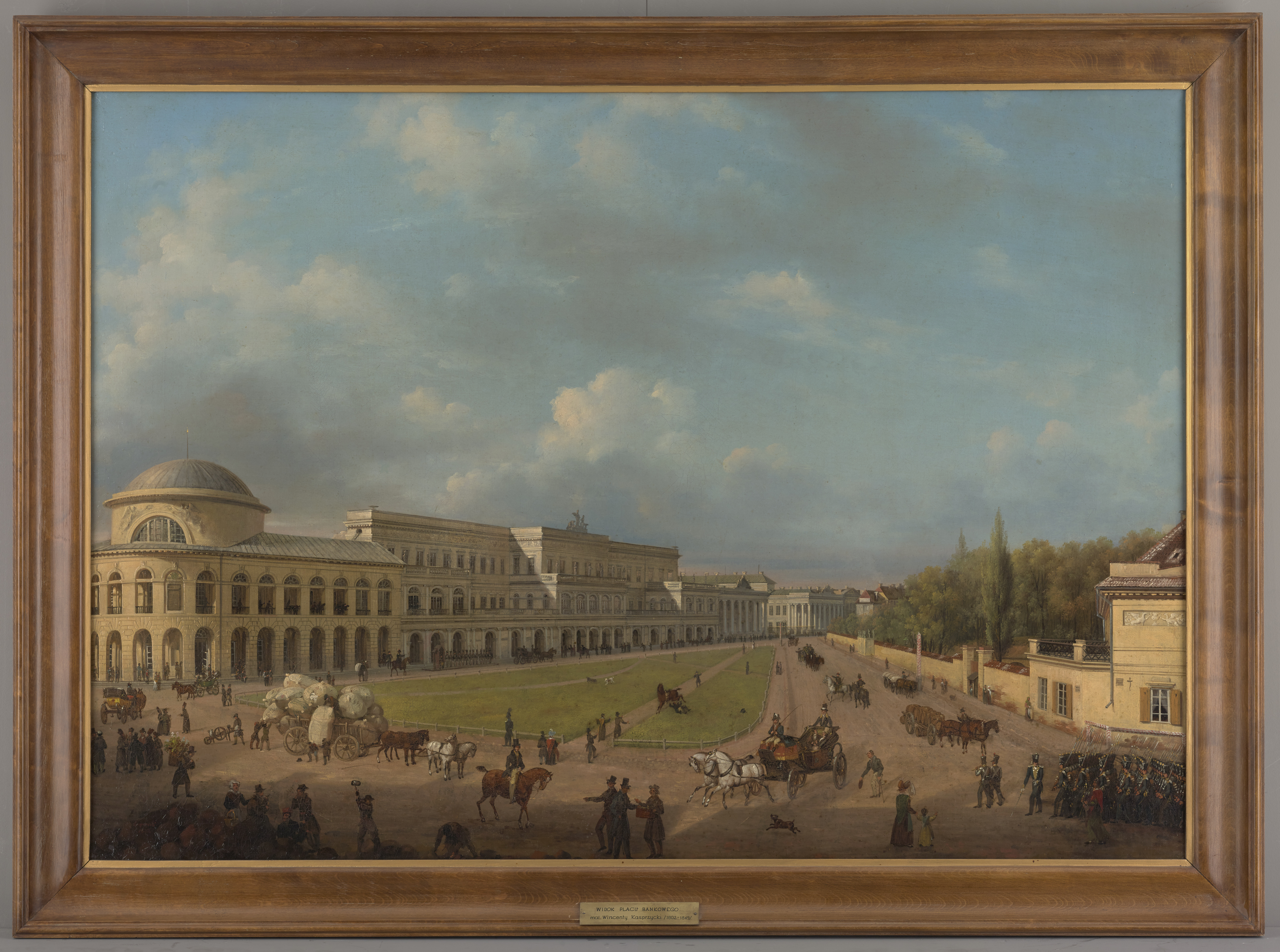
The Palace of the Minister of Treasury on an 1833 painting by Wincenty Kasprzycki.

The building was designed by architect Antonio Corazzi, and constructed between 1825 and 1830. It was built next to the Bank Square, in place of the Ogiński Palace, and between the Palace of the Government Commission of Revenues and Treasury and the Stock Exchange and Bank of Poland Building. It became the residence of the minister of state treasury Franciszek Ksawery Drucki-Lubecki.

From the 1870s to 1915, it hosted the Russian-language 1st All-Female Middle School. Is September 1918, the building begun being adopted to house the State Council of Poland, however it was resolved in October of that year, before the building was ready. It was later proposed for it to house the Seym, the lower house of the Parliament of Poland, instead, however the idea was abandoned.

It was renovated between 1920 and 1921, in accordance to project by Marian Lelewicz, and together with the neighbouring Palace of the Government Commission of Revenues and Treasury, it was the headquarters of the Ministry of State Treasury until 1939, then having its address listed as 3 and 5 Rymarska Street.

The building was bombed and burned in September 1939 during the Second World War. It was rebuilt between 1950 and 1954, under the lead of architect Piotr Biegański. Together with nearby Palace of the Government Commission of Revenues and Treasury, it became the city hall and the seat of the presidium of the National Council of the Capital City of Warsaw, which in 1973, was replaced with the office of the mayor. Since 1998, it also houses the Masovian Voivodeship Sejmik.

In 1951, in front of the building was unveiled the monument dedicated to Felix Dzerzhinsky, a 20th-century politician and communist revolutionary, as well as the leader of two Soviet secret police organizations, the Cheka and the OGPU. It was designed by Zbigniew Dunajewski. It was removed in 1989, and in 2001, in its place was unveiled the statue of Juliusz Słowacki, a 19th-century poet and writer, and a major figure in the Polish Romantic period, designed by Edward Wittig.

== Architecture ==
The neoclassical palace consists of a central rectangular three-storey portion, with a large extension extruding towards to the front. Short two-storey wings are located on the sides. A continuous two-storey arcades connect the fronts of the building sections that extend onto the square, enclosing the courtyard. In front of the palace stands the statue of Juliusz Słowacki, designed by Edward Wittig. The building is cojoined with the Palace of the Government Commission of Revenues and Treasury and the Stock Exchange and Bank of Poland Building, forming the city hall complex.

Its façade includes five commemorative plaques, which are dedicated to:

- the Polish Jacobins, a political group which held its meeting at this location in 1774 during the Kościuszko Uprising (unveiled in 1952);
- Antonio Corazzi, architect of the building (unveiled in 1977);
- Franciszek Ksawery Drucki-Lubecki, the minister of state treasury of Poland from 1921 to 1930, and the first owner of the building;
- Eugeniusz Kwiatkowski, the minister of state treasury of Poland from 1926 to 1930, and the deputy prime minister of Poland from 1935 to 1939 (unveiled in 2000);
- and Piotr Michałowski, a 19th-century painter, and a clerk of the Government Commission of Revenues and Treasury from 1823 and 1831 (unveiled 2011).
