= Statue of Juliusz Słowacki =

Statue in Warsaw, Poland

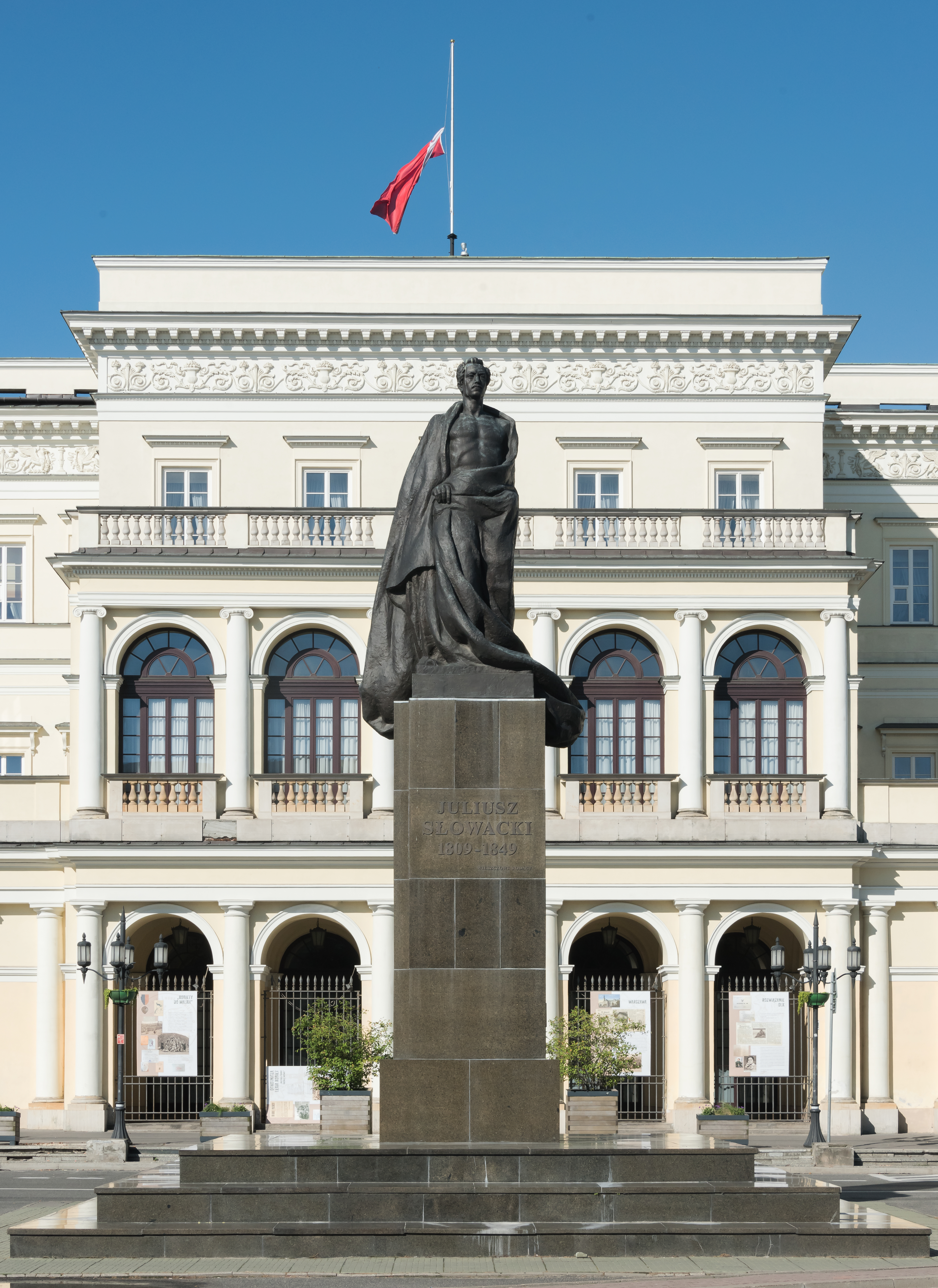
- The monument in 2022.
- Interactive map of Statue of Juliusz Słowacki
- Location: 3 and 5 Bank Square, Downtown, Warsaw, Poland
- Coordinates: 52°14′34.25″N 21°00′08.32″E
- Designer: Edward Wittig
- Type: Statue
- Material: Bronze (statue); granite (pedestal)
- Height: 12 m (39 ft)
- Opening date: 29 September 2001
- Dedicated to: Juliusz Słowacki

The statue of Juliusz Słowacki (Polish: Pomnik Juliusza Słowackiego) is a bronze statue in Warsaw, Poland, placed in front of the Palace of the Minister of Treasury at 3 and 5 Bank Square, within the North Downtown neighbourhood. It is dedicated to Juliusz Słowacki, a 19th-century poet and writer, and a major figure in the Polish Romantic period. The statue was originally designed by Edward Wittig in 1932, with the monument being unveiled on 29 September 2001.

== History ==
The first proposals to commemorate writer Juliusz Słowacki with a monument in Warsaw were raised in the 19th century, following his death in 1849. However, due to pro-Polish independence messages in his works, especially in Kordian, the Russian authorities always rejected them.

The idea surfaced again in 1927, after an urn with Słowacki's ashes was brought from Kraków to Warsaw. As such, the city council decided to erect him a monument. Sculptor Wacław Szymanowski was commissioned to design it; however, the project was soon halted due to lack of funding and the Great Depression. It was again proposed in the 1960s and the 1970s; however, it never came to fruition.

In 1995, members of the Association of Heritage Monuments Protection discovered a gypsum model of a sculpture of Słowacki, originally made in 1932 by Edward Wittig, as a proposed project for a memorial in Lviv, placed in a warehouse in the Royal Baths complex. A committee was formed with a goal of erecting a bronze cast of the sculpture in Warsaw, and collecting funds for it.

In 1999, a cornerstone was sent to Vatican City, where it was blessed by Pope John Paul II. He also signed the monument's founding document, which was later signed by the President of Poland Aleksander Kwaśniewski on 28 March 2001.

The bronze statue was unveiled on 29 September 2001 at the Bank Square, several meters to the south from the location of the former monument of Felix Dzerzhinsky, which was removed in 1989. The location was chosen because Słowacki used to work in the nearby Palace of the Minister of Treasury. Inside the granite pedestal of the monument was placed an 80-kilogram bronze urn, containing dirt from Juliusz Słowacki's grave in Paris, and from the graves of his parents, Salomea's in Kremenets, Ukraine, and Euzebiusz's in Vilnius, Lithuania, as well as the statue's founding document.

== Design ==
The monument consists of a large bronze statue of Juliusz Słowacki, placed on a granite pedestal. He is depicted nude, wrapped up with a large cloth, with his chest and head uncovered. The monument is 12 metres tall.
