= Stock Exchange and Bank of Poland Building =

Historic palace in Warsaw, Poland

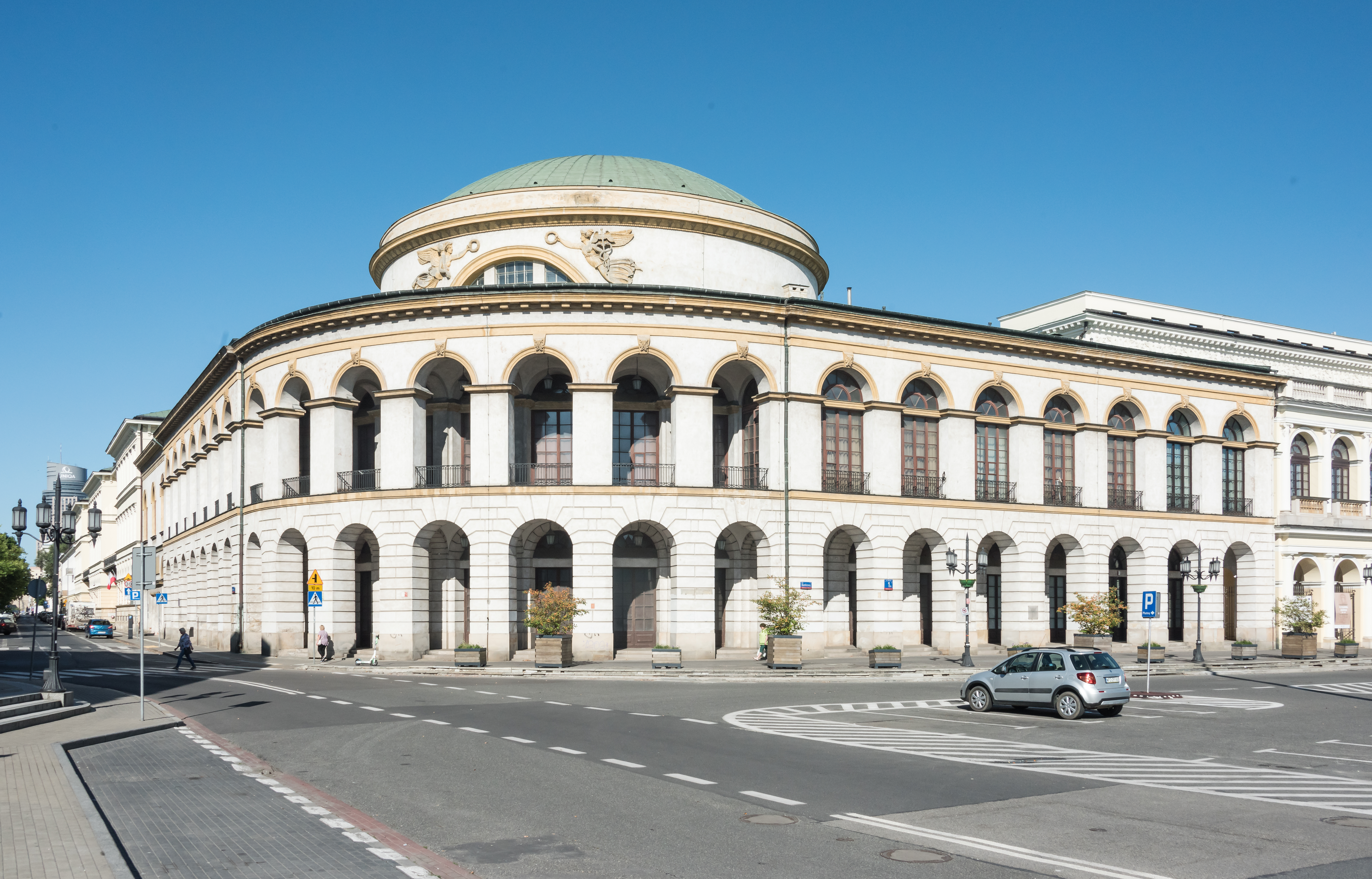
- The building in 2022.
- Interactive map of the Stock Exchange and Bank of Poland Building area

General information
- Type: Commercial building
- Architectural style: Neoclassical
- Location: Downtown, Warsaw, Poland, 1 Bank Square
- Coordinates: 52°14′31.42″N 21°00′08.54″E
- Construction started: 1825
- Completed: 1828

Technical details
- Floor count: 2

Design and construction
- Architects: Antonio Corazzi; Jan Jakub Gay

The Stock Exchange and Bank of Poland Building (Polish: Gmach Giełdy i Banku Polskiego) is a historic neoclassical commercial building in Warsaw, Poland, located at 1 Bank Square, within the North Downtown neighbourhood. It was designed by Antonio Corazzi and Jan Jakub Gay, and constructed between 1825 and 1828. The building originally housed the Warsaw Stock Exchange and the Bank of Poland. Currently, it houses the Museum of John Paul II Collection, an art gallery being a branch of the Museum of John Paul II and Primate Wyszyński which displays a collection of around 400 paintings, mainly copies of masterpieces of European painters.

== History ==
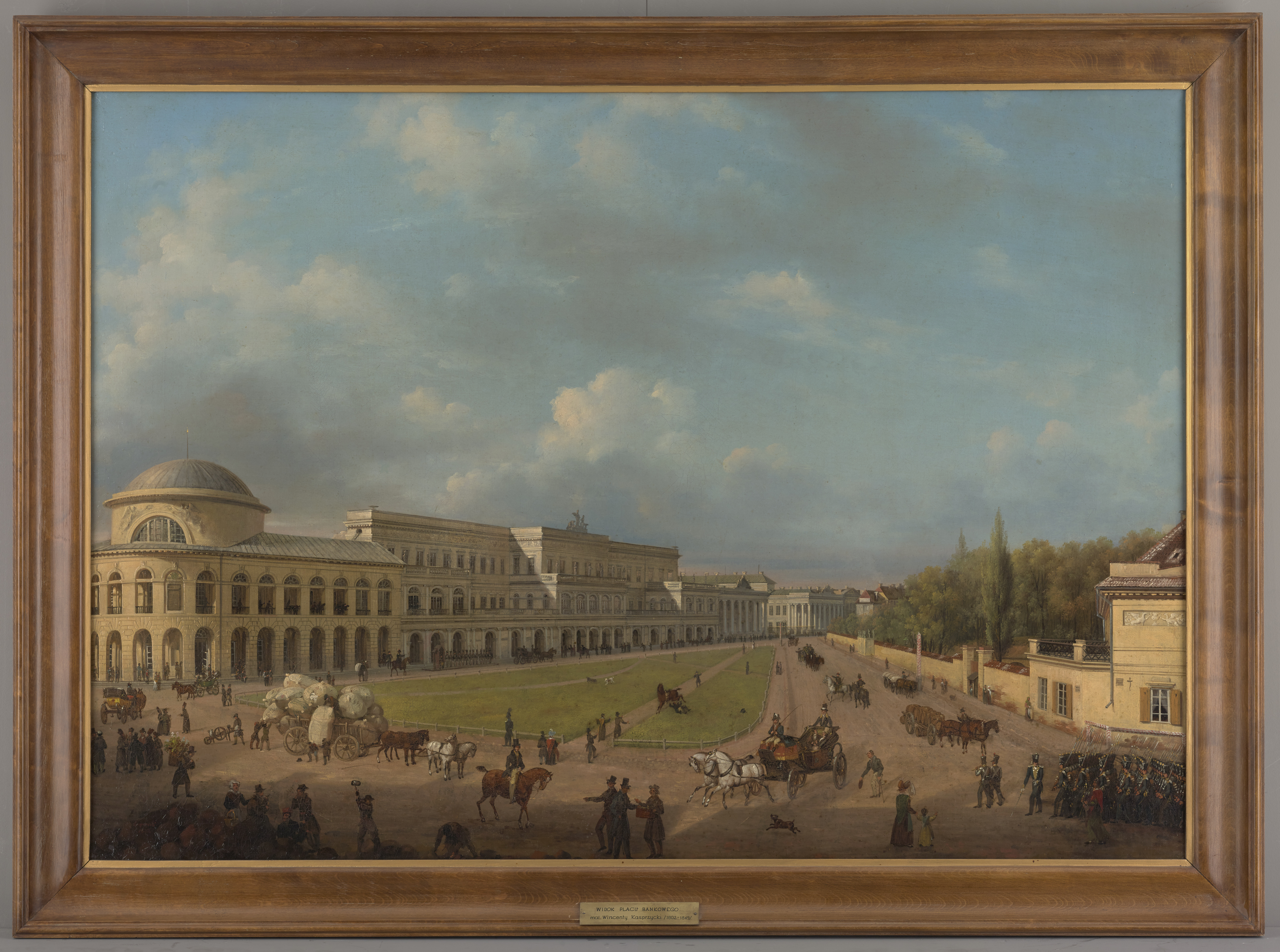
The Stock Exchange and Bank of Poland Building on an 1833 painting by Wincenty Kasprzycki.

The building was designed by Antonio Corazzi and Jan Jakub Gay, and constructed between 1825 and 1828. The main part of the building originally housed the Warsaw Stock Exchange, while a smaller section housed parts of the Bank of Poland. It was connected to the current building of the Central Office of Measures at 2A Elektoralna Street, built between 1828 and 1830, which also housed Bank of Poland. In its original version, part of the arcades did not include glass windows. In 1830, a clock and a thermometer were installed on its façade, and in 1876, portions of its arcades were remodelled to add more office space. The building was expanded and modified in the 19th century. It was renovated between 1919 and 1921, under the lead of architect Marian Lalewicz.

In 1939, it was partially damaged in aerial bombings during the siege of Warsaw in the Second World War. It was renovated between 1950 and 1954, with the project by architect Piotr Biegański.

In 1965, it was entered into the national heritage list.

In 1989, the city opened in the building the Museum of John Paul II Collection, an art gallery displaying a collection of paintings donated in 1987 by Zbigniew Karol Porczyński and Janina Porczyńska. It includes around 400 works, mainly copies of masterpieces of European painters, including many later revealed to be falsifications. In 2019, it became a branch of the Museum of John Paul II and Primate Wyszyński.

== Architecture ==
The main part of the two-storey neoclassical building has a form of a rotunda, topped with a dome, and with a façade featuring large arcades. The top of its façade features four sculptures of angels. It additionally has two wings, and is connected to the neighbouring building of the Central Office of Measures at 2A Elektoralna Street.

Currently, it houses the Museum of John Paul II Collection, an art gallery being a branch of the Museum of John Paul II and Primate Wyszyński which displays a collection of around 400 paintings, mainly copies of masterpieces of European painters.
