= Polish Military Organisation Memorial =

Statue in Warsaw, Poland

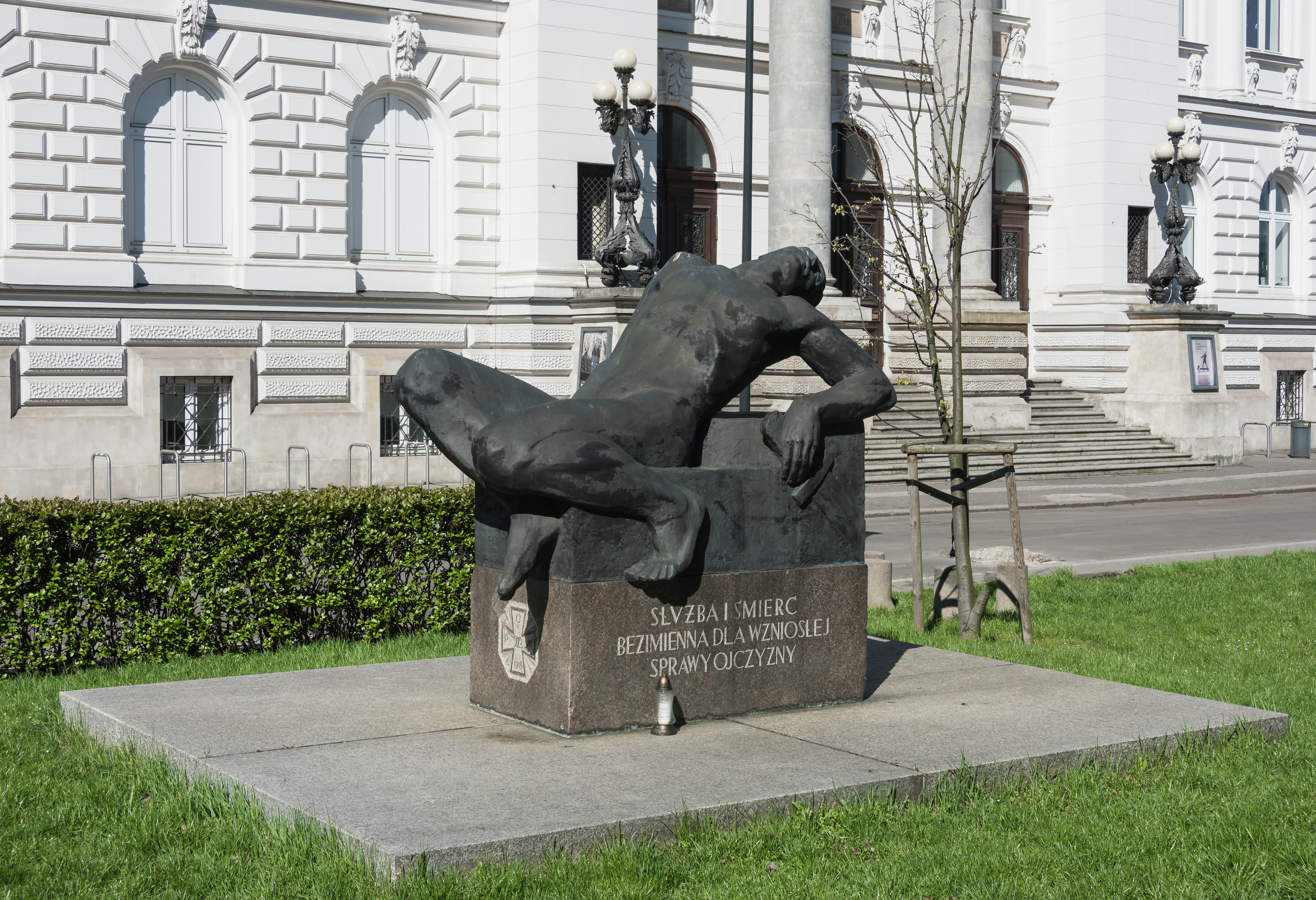
- The monument in 2021
- Interactive map of Polish Military Organisation Memorial
- Location: 3 Stanisław Małachowski Square, Downtown, Warsaw, Poland
- Coordinates: 52°14′21.4″N 21°00′43.7″E
- Designer: Edward Wittig (original); Marek Moderau (recreation); Zbigniew Mikielewicz (recreation)
- Type: Statue
- Material: Metal
- Opening date: 10 November 1933 (original); 10 November 1999 (recreation)
- Dedicated to: Officers of the Military Organisation Memorial

The Polish Military Organisation Memorial (Polish: Pomnik Peowiaka), also known as the Memorial to the Fallen Soldiers of the Polish Military Organisation (Polish: Pomnik Poległych Żołnierzy Polskiej Organizacji Wojskowej) is a monument in Warsaw, Poland, within the Downtown district. It is placed at the Stanisław Małachowski Square, in front of the Zachęta National Art Gallery, within the neighbourhood of North Downtown. The monument is dedicated to the officers of the Polish Military Organisation, a secret military organization, active during the First World War and the Russian Civil War, from 1914 to 1921. It aims were gathering intelligence and sabotaging the enemies of Poland, including the Russian Empire, Austro-Hungary, and the German Empire. The monument consists of a metal statue of a dying naked male warrior with his head falling back, holding a short sword in his left hand. It was designed by Edward Wittig, and unveiled on 10 November 1933. It was removed in 1940, and its recreation by Marek Moderau and Zbigniew Mikielewicz was unveiled on 10 November 1999.

== History ==
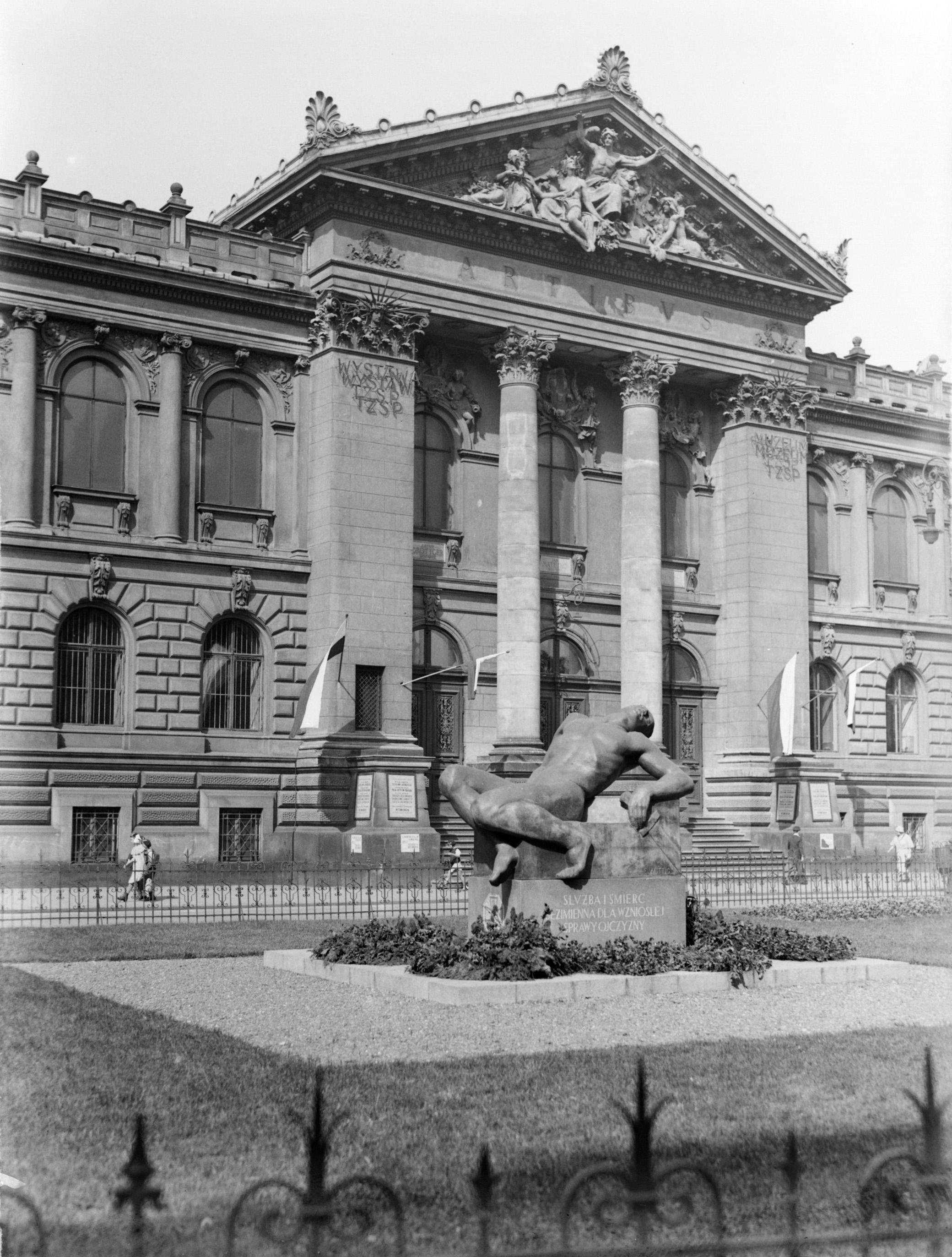
The monument in 1934.

The monument is dedicated to the officers of the Polish Military Organisation, a secret military organization, active during the First World War and the Russian Civil War, from 1914 to 1921. It aims were gathering intelligence and sabotaging the enemies of Poland, including the Russian Empire, Austro-Hungary, and the German Empire.

The monument was designed by sculptor Edward Wittig. It was unveiled on 10 November 1933, in front of the Zachęta National Art Gallery. The location was chosen as a place where, in 1918, Józef Piłsudski, the Chief of State of Poland, observed a military parade of the Polish Military Organisation officers, from the balcony of the nearby Kronenberg Palace.

The sculpture depicted a dying naked male warrior with his head falling back, holding a short sword in his left hand. It was based on Wittig's previous smaller statue, which was part of his 1926 sculpture titled Fight, placed at the grave of Jan Opieliński, at the Powązki Cemetery in Warsaw. The monument was poorly received by art critics, some accusing the author of reusing his previous work.

The monument was removed in 1940 in uncertain circumstances, while the city was under the German occupation during the Second World War. According to some sources, it was removed by German officers, while, according to others, it was removed in February 1940 by Polish residents, and subsequently buried in the ground nearby, to hide it from the German officers. After the end of the conflict, the slightly damaged pedestal of the monument was discovered at the Rabbit House palace in Mokotów. The sculpture was reconstructed by Marek Moderau and Zbigniew Mikielewicz, based on archival photographs, and surviving fragments of the plaster cast of the original statue. It was unveiled on 10 November 1999.

== Characteristics ==
The monument consists of a metal statue of a dying naked male warrior with his head falling back, holding a short sword in his left hand. It is placed on a rectangular cuboid pedestal, which bears an engraving of the insignia of the Polish Military Organisation on the front. On its right side, it bears an inscription in Polish, which reads "Służba i śmierć bezimienna dla wziosłej sprawy ojczyzny". It translates to "The service and nameless death for the noble cause of the Homeland". On its left side, it has inscribed "P.O.W.", which is an acronym for "Polska Organizacja Wojskowa", meaning the Polish Military Organisation. The monument is placed at the Stanisław Małachowski Square, in front of the Zachęta National Art Gallery.
