= Bank Square =

Bank Square may refer to several places

== Poland ==
- Bank Square, Warsaw

== United Kingdom ==
- Bank Square, Aberystwyth
- Bank Square, Dulverton, Somerset
- Bank Square, St Just in Penwith
- Bank Square, Wilmslow
