= Palace of the Government Commission of Revenues and Treasury =

Coordinates: 52°14′35″N 21°0′3″E

Commission Palace
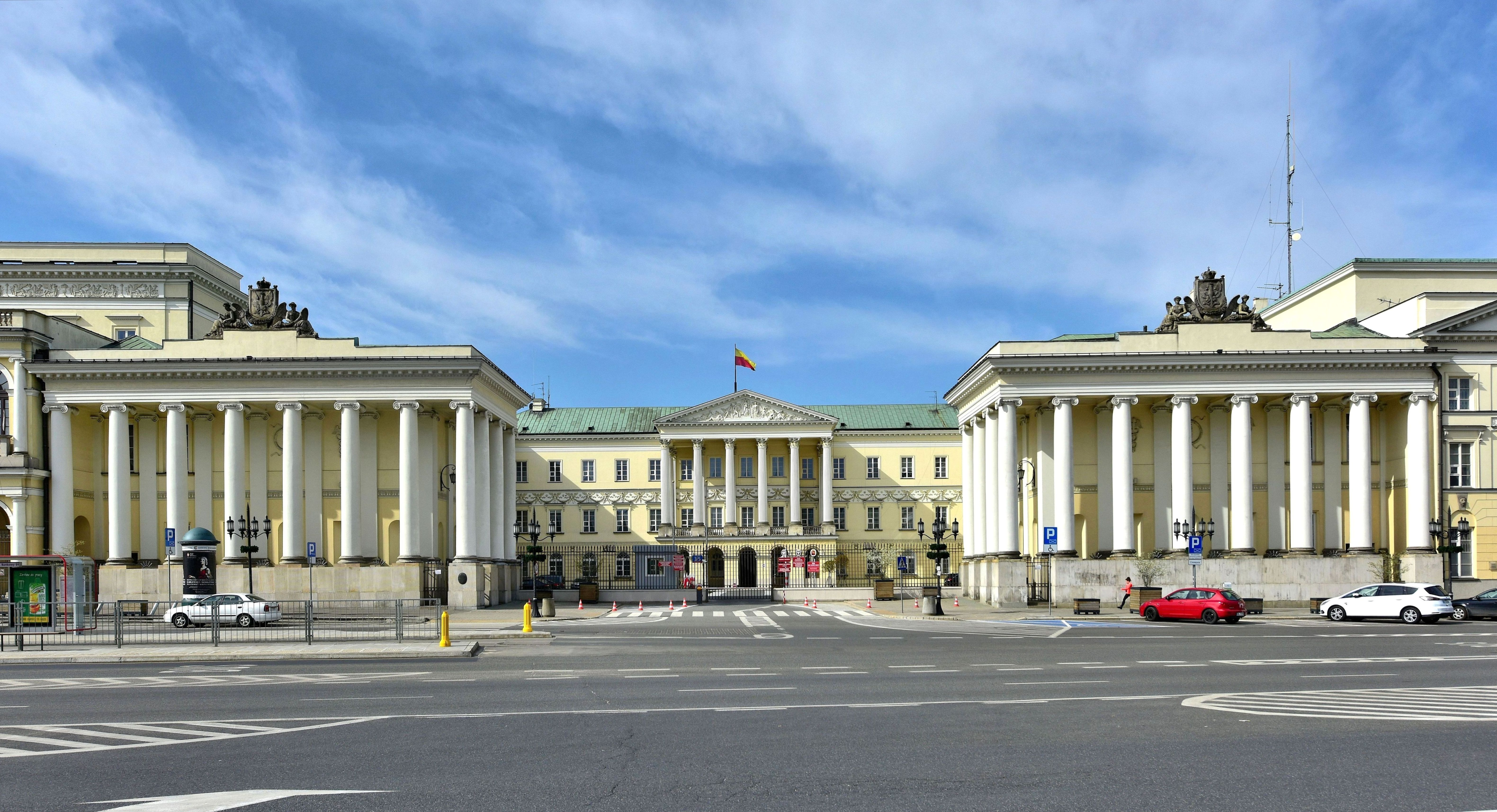
- The Palace of the Government Commission of Revenues and Treasury at Bank Square
- Interactive map of the Commission Palace area

General information
- Architectural style: Neoclassical
- Location: plac Bankowy 3/5
- Current tenants: Mayor of Warsaw; Masovian Voivode Office
- Construction started: 1823
- Completed: 1825; 201 years ago
- Inaugurated: 1954
- Renovated: 1919–1921
- Destroyed: 1939
- Client: Ministry of Revenues and Treasury of Congress Poland

Other information
- Public transit: Ratusz Arsenał

Historic Monument of Poland
- Designated: 1994-09-08
- Part of: Warsaw – historic city center with the Royal Route and Wilanów
- Reference no.: M.P. 1994 nr 50 poz. 423

The Palace of the Government Commission of Revenues and Treasury (Polish: Pałac Komisji Rządowej Przychodów i Skarbu) is located at 3/5 Bank Square in Warsaw. It is sometimes simply referred to as the Commission Palace. Currently it is not the home to the named ministry, but serves as Warsaw's official city hall, the seat of the Mayor of Warsaw and the office of the Voivode of the Masovian Voivodeship.

== History ==
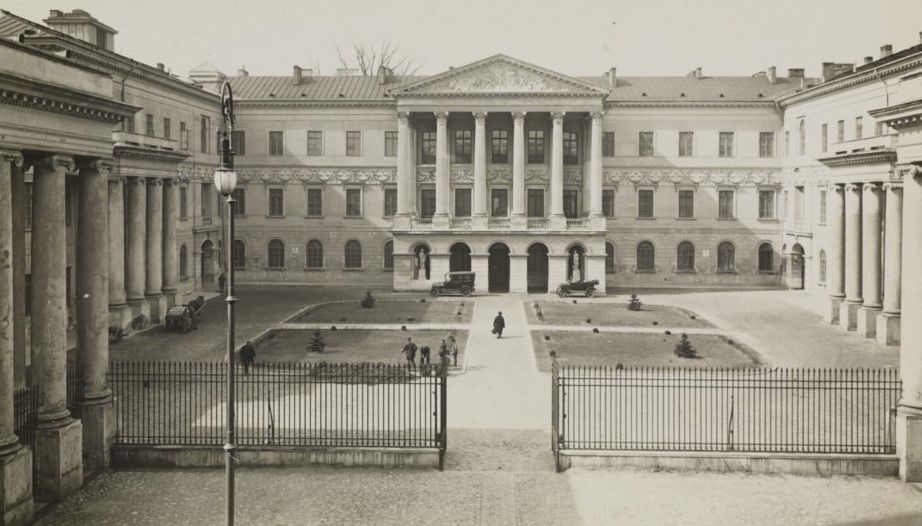
Palace before 1939

In the middle of the 17th Century, a residence was built for Chancellor Jan Leszczyński which was probably designed by the Italian architect Giovanni Battista Gisleni. In the second half of the 18th century the palace was owned by Józef Potocki, and then by the Zieliński family. The palace was fundamentally rebuilt from 1823 to 1825 by Antonio Corazzi in neo-classical form as the base of the Ministry of Revenues and Treasury for its minister Franciszek Ksawery Drucki-Lubecki. There was the Stock Exchange, the Minister's Palace as well as the Ministry building all adjacent to each other.

From 1829 to 1831, Polish romantic poet Juliusz Słowacki worked here as an official.

From 1919 to 1921 the buildings were renovated under the direction of Marian Lalewicz for the Ministry of Treasury.

During the invasion of Poland in 1939 the palace was burnt after being hit by German bombs and during the Warsaw Uprising it was almost completely destroyed, however some walls stayed intact.

After the war, it was rebuilt in its neo-classical form under the supervision of architect Piotr Biegański and began its current role.

== Architecture ==
The three-storey palace is located on a horseshoe-shaped floor plan around a main central courtyard. The six-columned Corinthian portico dominates. The sculptures in the tympanum of this portico are by Paweł Maliński and represent allegories of wisdom (Minerva), industry (Jason), trade (Mercury), and the Vistula and Bug rivers. The second level above the running frieze includes cherubs and garlands probably by M. Vincenti.

The side wings of the palace help form the courtyard and are in the style of the main building. Overlooking Bank Square there is only two floors, both wings are also narrower than the main wing. The wings are each of a stepped gable nature.

In front of the one wing is a monument to Juliusz Słowacki, designed by Edward Wittig (actually designed in 1932), and unveiled in 2001 to replace a statue to Felix Dzerzhinsky (by Zbigniew Dunajewski).

== Commemorative plaques ==
Plaques placed on the ground floor of the building between the arcades commemorate:

- leaders of the Polish Jacobins (unveiled in 1952)
- Antonio Corazzi (from 1977, on the centennial anniversary of his death)
- politician Eugeniusz Kwiatkowski (from 2000)
- and artist Piotr Michałowski (from 2011)
