= Ujazdów Park =

Park in Poland

Coordinates: 52°13′19″N 21°1′32″E

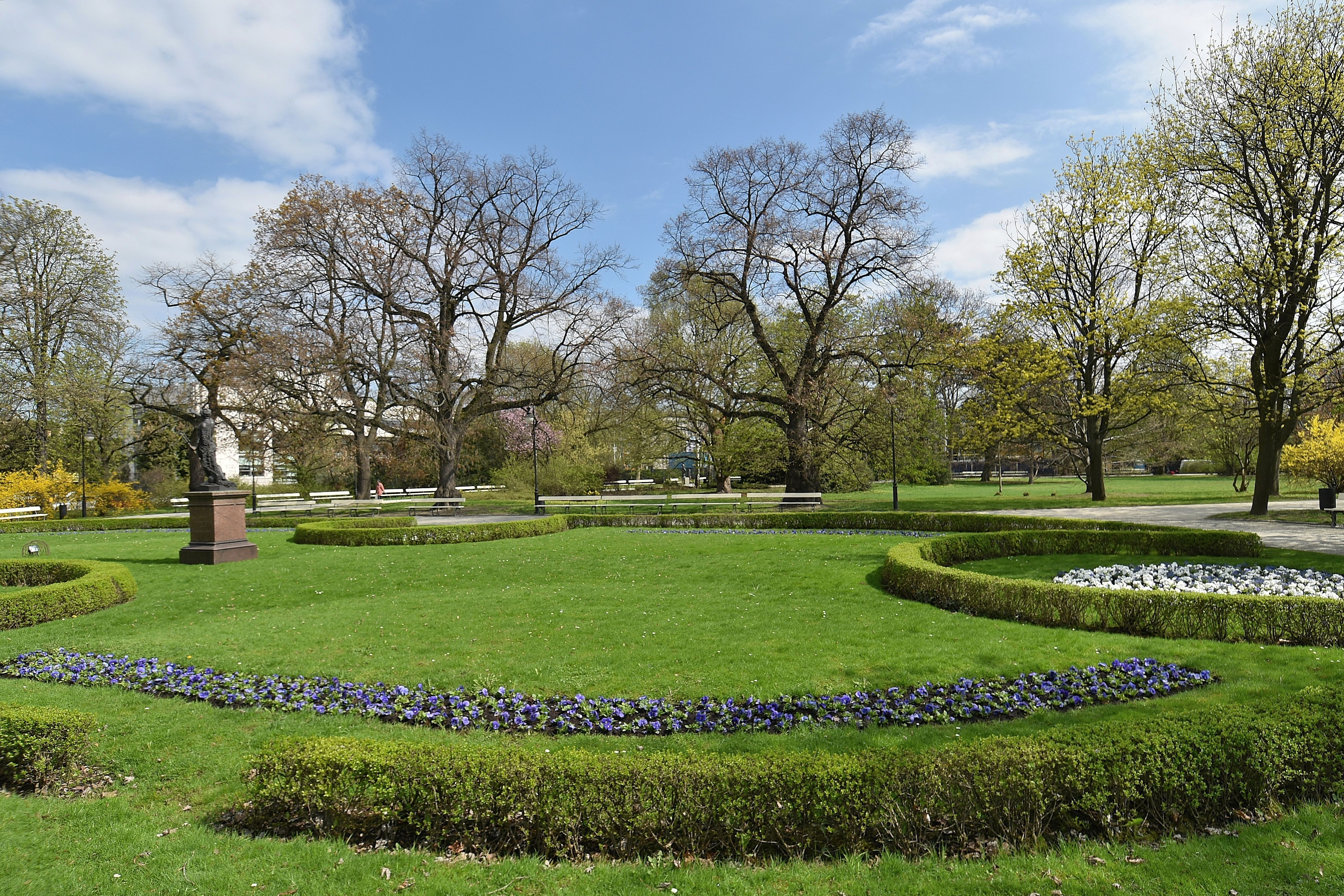
- Monument to Ignacy Jan Paderewski.
- Interactive map of Ujazdów Park
- Type: Municipal
- Location: Warsaw
- Area: 5.7 ha
- Created: 1896
- Status: Open all year

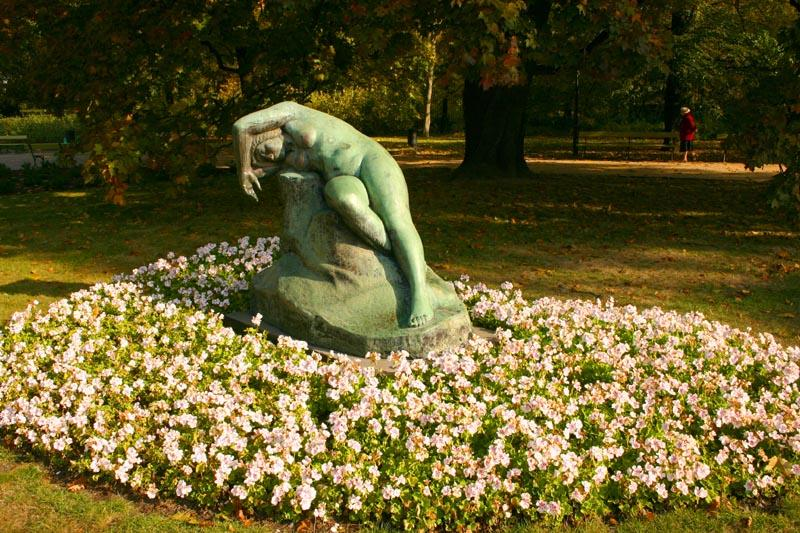
Ewa, a sculpture by Edward Wittig

Ujazdów Park (Polish: Park Ujazdowski) is one of the most picturesque parks of Warsaw, Poland. It borders Aleje Ujazdowskie (Ujazdów Avenue), with its many embassies and Sejm building.

== History ==
From the late Middle Ages the area had been occupied by the village of Ujazdów, located several miles south of Warsaw's Old Town. In 1619-1625 a palace and garden were built here by Giovanni Battista Trevano for King Sigismund III Vasa.

In 1782 King Stanisław August Poniatowski bought the village and relocated it about a kilometer west (near what is now the main campus of the Warsaw Polytechnic), while the old village's area (along the axis of the "Royal Road") was turned into Pole Marsowe (the Field of Mars), a large square for military parades, modeled and named after Paris' Champ de Mars. The village itself was renamed Nowa Wieś ("New Village") and gave its name to the present-day ulica Nowowiejska (New Village Street).

After the Russian takeover of Warsaw in the wake of the Napoleonic Wars, the area lost its military character and became a venue for annual fairs. It also served as a place of entertainment, with merry-go-rounds and open-air stands placed there every summer. In 1893, under Mayor Sokrates Starynkiewicz, the renowned garden architect Franciszek Szanior was commissioned to turn the former Field of Mars into a public park in the-then popular "landscape style," a mixture of Romantic garden and Baroque-style lanes. The avenue of chestnut trees in the western part of the area was incorporated into the newly founded park.

At the time of its foundation, the park was one of the most modern in Europe. It featured a large pond, fountains and a reinforced-concrete bridge over the southern part of the pond, built by the renowned engineer William Lindley. The bridge was the second construction built of that material in the world, after the bridge in Viggen, Switzerland (1894). The park also had gas lighting, a playground for children, and a public weighing scale (still in use as of 2009). The park's sculptures were carved by Edward Wittig, Pius Weloński and Théodore-Charles Gruyère. After World War II, a monument to Ignacy Jan Paderewski, by Michał Kamieński, was added.

Ujazdów Park is a favorite of Varsovians: its playground is popular with children, and many newlyweds use the park as a setting for their wedding photographs. In 2002 the park was completely refurbished.

== See also ==
- Ujazdów Castle
- Łazienki Park
- Pole Mokotowskie
- English Landscape Garden
- English Landscape Park
