= Bank Polski =

Former bank in Poland

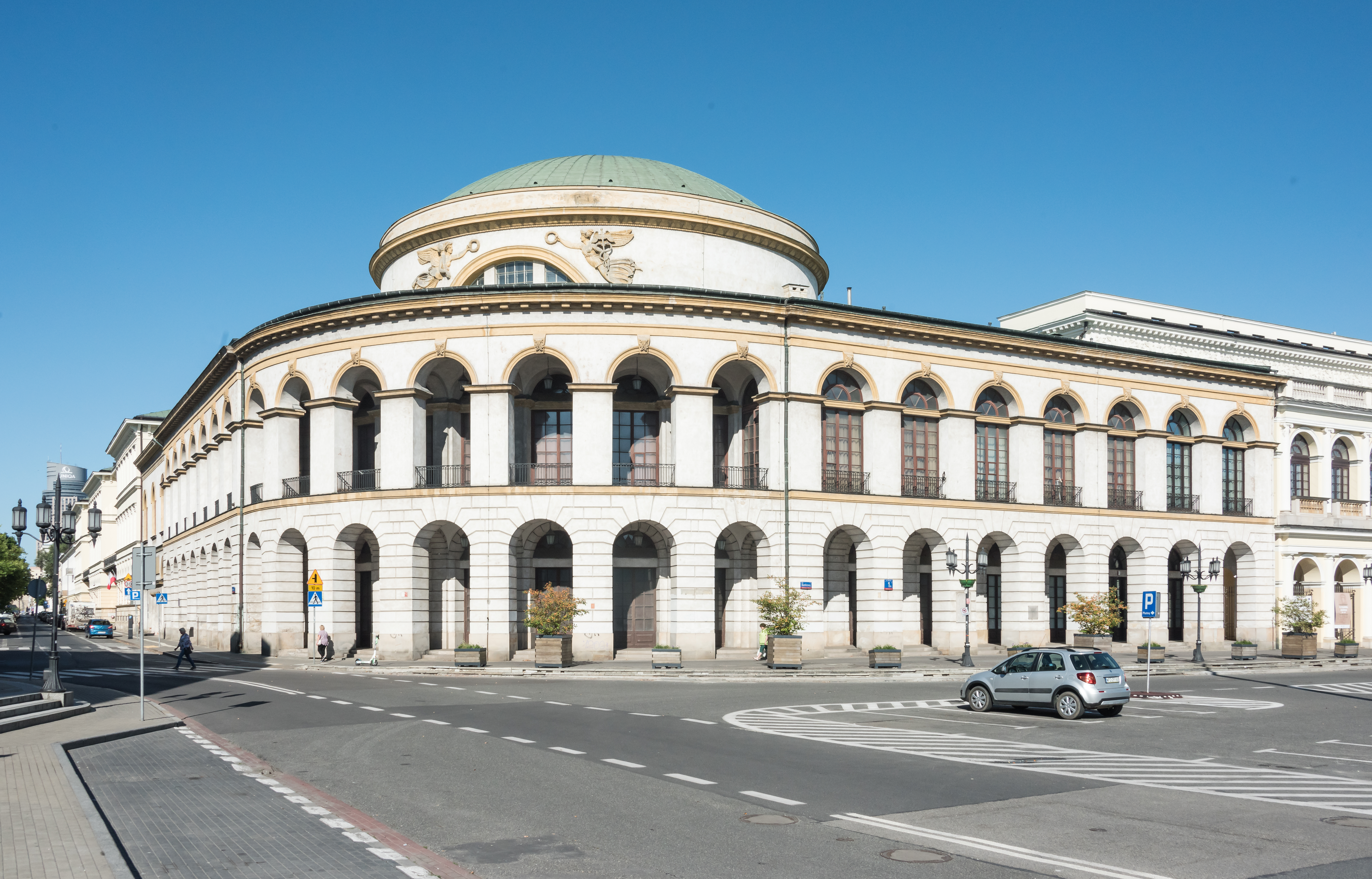
- Former building of the Bank Polski in Warsaw
- Company type: State-owned enterprise
- Industry: Central banking
- Founded: January 29, 1828
- Founder: Prince Franciszek Ksawery Drucki-Lubecki
- Defunct: 1885
- Fate: Absorbed by the State Bank of the Russian Empire
- Headquarters: Warsaw, Congress Kingdom of Poland
- Area served: Congress Poland
- Owner: Polish State

The Bank Polski (lit. 'Bank of Poland'), sometimes referred to as the "First Bank of Poland" to distinguish it from its 20th-century namesake, was a public bank in Congress Poland. It was created in 1828, initially with a broad scope of activities that soon started shrinking as a consequence of Poland's political upheavals. The Bank Polski ceased minting coins in late 1832, ceased issuing notes in Polish złoty in 1841, lost its monetary role entirely in 1870, and was eventually absorbed in 1885 by the State Bank of the Russian Empire.

== History ==
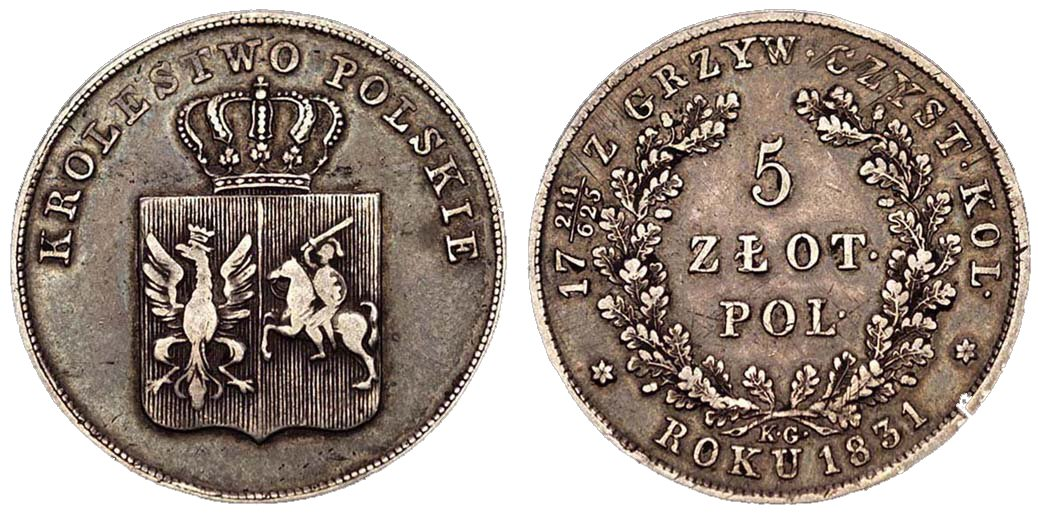
5-złoty coin issued during the November 1830 Uprising

The first Bank of Poland was founded in Warsaw by royal decree of 29 January 1828 on the initiative of Prince Franciszek Ksawery Drucki-Lubecki. An institution of the government of the Kingdom of Poland, it was entitled with issuance of Polish currency as well as control over the credit rates. It was also entitled with a concession to operate foreign currencies and buy off credits issued by foreign companies and banks. Its initial activity was largely linked to the management of the Polish debt, including "old debt" inherited from the defunct Duchy of Warsaw.

The Bank Polski was initially allowed to issue banknotes up to the amount of the capital that the government had provided to it together with the Land Credit Society of the Kingdom of Poland, initially 30 million złoty. It also financed a number of important enterprises in the Kingdom of Poland. Between 1829 and 1837 it spent a large part of its income on road construction. Until 1842, it was also the main sponsor of the coal mining development in the Dąbrowa Basin and the Old-Polish Industrial Region around Skarżysko-Kamienna.

Following its support of the November Uprising in 1830-1831, the Bank Polski was deprived of its newly acquired role as mint in 1832. In 1841, the Russian authorities forcibly withdrew all złoty-denominated banknotes, and imposed the ruble instead as sole legal tender. The Bank Polski was still authorized to issue bilingual notes denominated in ruble, but in 1859 the bilingualism was terminated and the notes were printed in Russian only.

After the January Uprising of 1863-1864, the Bank Polski definitely lost its independence and was made subordinate directly to the Russian Imperial Ministry of Treasury. In May 1870, it was deprived of the privilege of currency issuance and banned from giving long-term credits. It kept operating on a small scale as a commercial bank until 1885, when it was absorbed entirely by the State Bank of the Russian Empire.

== Building ==
The Bank Polski and Stock Exchange Building in Warsaw was erected in 1825-1828 on a design by Italian architect Antonio Corazzi, and became the seat of the bank as well as that of the Warsaw Stock Exchange. It was severely damaged during World War II, then reconstructed in 1950-1954 under supervision by architect Piotr Biegański. Since 1989, it has been the home of the Museum of John Paul II Collection, also known as the Porczyński Gallery.

== See also ==
- Bank Polski SA
- List of banks in Poland
- List of central banks
