= Aviator Memorial (Warsaw) =

Monument in Warsaw, Poland

Coordinates: 52°12′58″N 20°59′17.99″E

- Pomnik Lotnika
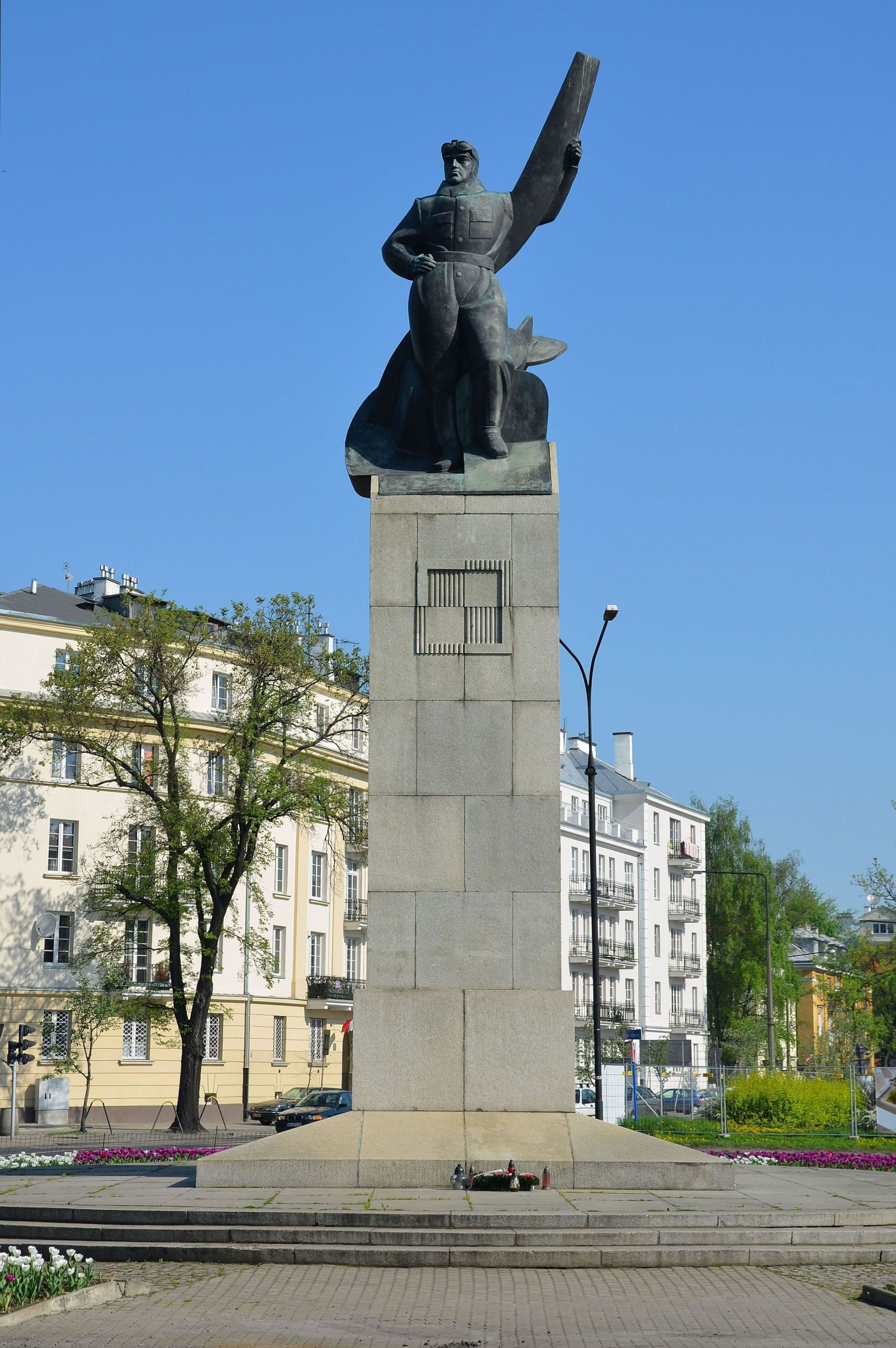
- Interactive map of Aviator Memorial
- Location: Warsaw, Poland
- Designer: Edward Wittig
- Height: 15 m (49 ft)
- Completion date: November 11, 1932 (original), September 9, 1967 (reconstruction)
- Dedicated to: Franciszek Żwirko and Stanisław Wigura

The Aviator Memorial (Polish: Pomnik Lotnika) is a monument in Warsaw designed by Edward Wittig in honor of Franciszek Żwirko and Stanisław Wigura, two aviation heroes of Poland. It is a reconstruction of the original monument that was unveiled in 1932 in Union of Lublin Square and destroyed in 1944. The current monument was constructed in 1967.

== History ==
=== Original monument (1932–1944) ===
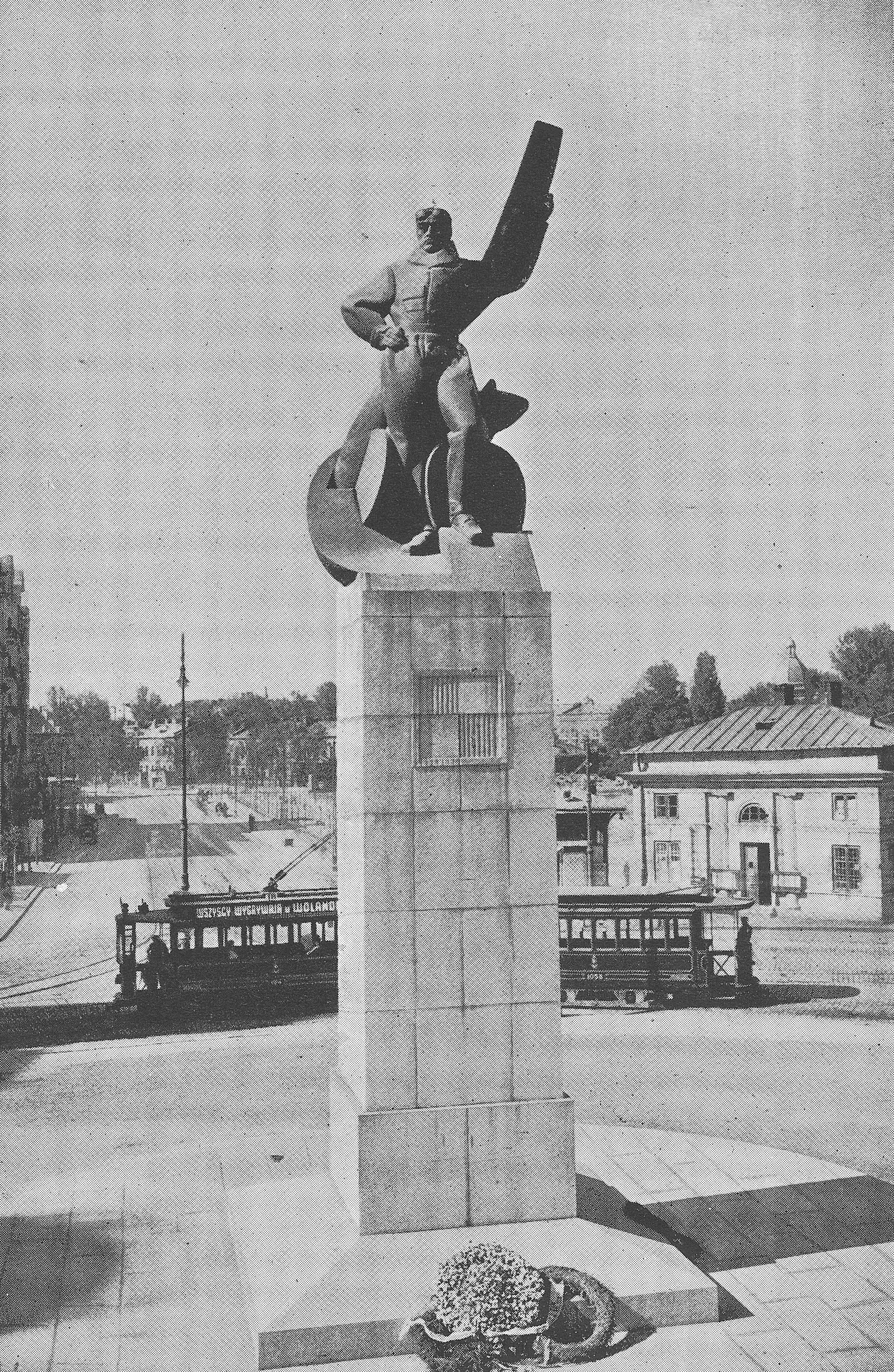
Original 1932 monument

The sculpture was designed by Edward Wittig in 1932 and was based on Leonard Zbigniew Lepszy, who posed for the sculpture. A model of the monument was presented in 1929 at the Polish General Exhibition in Poznań. It was unveiled on 11 November 1932 at Union of Lublin Square. The monument faced the exit of Jana Chrystiana Szucha Avenue. The author of the granite pedestal and the surroundings of the monument was Antoni Jawornicki. The cast of the aviator's statue was made in the Warsaw Metallurgical Works of L. Krance and T. Łempicki. The construction of the monument was financed from public contributions and proceeds from aviation events. The monument was one of the first monuments in Europe dedicated to aviation.

In 1942, Kotwica graffiti made by Jan Gut and Jan Bytnar appeared on the statue's pedestal. After World War II, two stone blocks from the pedestal, including one with the traces of the Kotwica, were moved to the Stefan Batory Liceum in Warsaw, and in 1981 to the Museum of Wola.

In 1944 the monument was destroyed by the Germans during the destruction of Warsaw in retaliation to the Warsaw Uprising. Fragments of the sculpture were found after the war on the grounds of the Lilpop, Rau i Loewenstein factory in Wola.

The remains of the original plinth of the Aviator Monument were abandoned on 13 September 1944 Park (now Colonel Jan Szypowski "Leśnik" Park) in Kwatery Grotów Street. A fragment of the plinth was also used for the RAF Pilots Memorial in Wola and the Grenadier Monument in Grenadierow Street in Grochow.

=== Reconstruction (1967) ===
The destroyed monument was reconstructed by Alfred Jesion using Wittig's original designs following its destruction in World War II. The 6-meter (20 ft) bronze cast statue, weighing 5 tonnes, was made by Gliwickie Zakłady Urządzeń Technicznych. On the front face of the 9-meter-tall (30 ft) Silesian granite pedestal is a carving of a Polish Air Force checkerboard. The aviator is facing Żwirki i Wigury Street.

The unveiling of the reconstructed monument took place on 9 September 1967 at the exit of an avenue outside Warsaw Okęcie Airport. On that day, a ceremonial promotion of flight school officers took place at the monument, followed by an air parade and military parade.

== See also ==
- Monument in Memory of the Fallen Polish Pilots in World War II
- Polish Air Force Memorial
