= Mostowski Palace =

Coordinates: 52°14′45.73″N 20°59′56.49″E

- Pałac Mostowskich
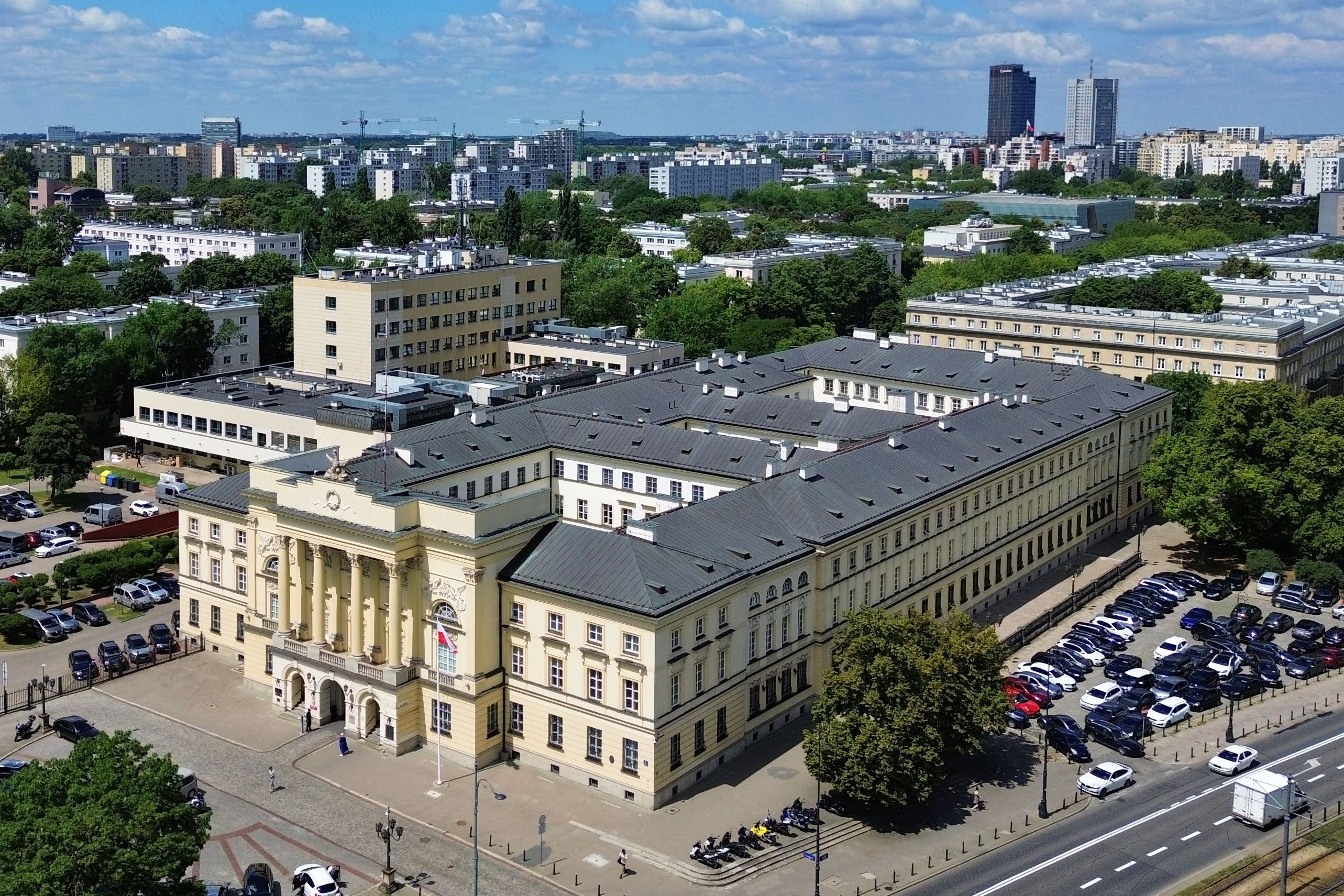
- Interactive map of the Mostowski Palace area

General information
- Architectural style: Neoclassical (1823-24)
- Location: Warsaw, Poland
- Construction started: 1762
- Completed: 1765
- Demolished: 1944

Design and construction
- Architect: Antonio Corazzi (façade)

Other information
- Public transit access: Ratusz Arsenał

Historic Monument of Poland
- Designated: 1994-09-08
- Part of: Warsaw – historic city center with the Royal Route and Wilanów
- Reference no.: M.P. 1994 nr 50 poz. 423

Mostowski Palace (Polish: Pałac Mostowskich) is an 18th-century palace in Warsaw, Poland, located at ul. Nowolipie 2 (2 Nowolipie Street) — prior to World War II, at ul. Przejazd 15.

== History ==
The palace had been built in 1762-65 in the Baroque style for the Voivode of Minsk, Jan August Hylzen.

In 1795 it became, by inheritance, the property of Tadeusz Mostowski, a prominent figure of revolutionary Poland.

The palace was purchased by the government and rebuilt in 1823-24 in the classicist style to a design by Antonio Corazzi. The building became the seat of Congress Poland's Commission of Internal Affairs and Police, and a venue of concerts by Fryderyk Chopin.

In 1831, during the November Uprising, the palace was taken over for the needs of the Imperial Russian Army.

Renovated in 1920, it became the seat of various municipal offices. During World War II, in 1944, it was destroyed by the Germans, except for the facade. After the war, in 1949, the Mostowski Palace was rebuilt. It is now the seat of Warsaw's police headquarters.

== See also ==
- Staszic Palace
- Kazimierzowski Palace
