= Antonio Corazzi =

Italian architect

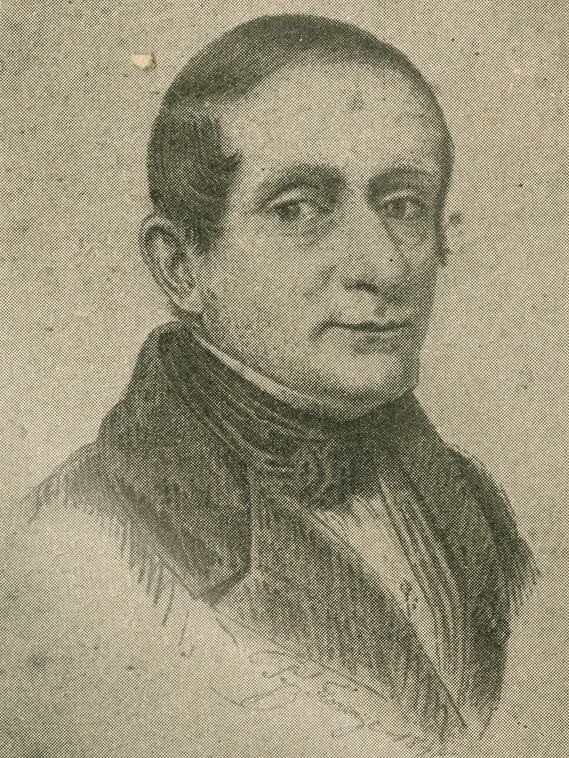
- A 1904 print of Corazzi
- Born: 1792; Livorno, Italy
- Died: 1877 (aged 84–85); Florence, Italy
- Occupation: Architect
- Buildings: Warsaw Grand Theatre, Staszic Palace

Antonio Corazzi (1792-1877) was an Italian architect working in Poland from 1819 to 1847, mainly in the Neoclassical style. Corazzi designed some of Warsaw's most renowned public buildings and civic structures.

== Biography ==
Antonio Corazzi was the son of an impresario of the Avalorati Theatre in Livorno. In 1811, after graduating from a Piarist high school, he joined the Reggia Accademia delle Belle Arti del Disegno in Florence, where he probably studied until 1816.

In 1818, the Staszic government of the Congress Poland (under the control of the Russian Empire) asked the government to Tuscany for a referral of an architect so in 1819 he came to Warsaw.

After 27 years in Poland, he returned to Florence. In 1847, he was appointed a member of the Academy of Fine Arts in Florence, where he designed, among other projects: the parliament (c. 1860), the Pantheon di Dante (c. 1865), and theaters in Alexandria and Copenhagen.

== Architecture ==
His work very quickly adapted to the architectural climate of the Kingdom of Poland, especially in Warsaw, which, in the first decades of the 19th century, was still alive with the traditions of Stanisław's neoclassical era.

Corazzi's architectural creativity from 1819 to 1847 in Poland coincides with two major periods of architectural thought in the Warsaw School. 1815 to 1830 cover the period of the final formation of the neoclassical form, and from 1831 to 1850 the interpretations of these forms in the increasingly burgeoning Romanticism era.

The most characteristic of Corazzi 's work during the first period, were undertaken by him as part of the policy agenda of Minister Lubecki.

Corazzi had 50 projects in Poland, of which 45 were in Warsaw, among them several projects of urban planning work including Theatre Square and Bank Square in Warsaw. Almost all objects of a monumental design were made before 1831, mostly at the request of the government (among them, the Palace of the Sandomierz Commission (Pałac Komisji Województwa Sandomierskiego w Radomiu) in Radom).

Corazzi understood the need to establish an architectural tradition for Warsaw. Its buildings, particularly those that are on the tightly built-up streets merge into a unified whole. They are distinguished by only the elegance of line and decorative moderation, proper architecture of the 19th century, and the scale and proportion of the architecture of the Stanislaus period.

The pinnacle of his creativity and neo-classical architecture in Poland is the Grand Theatre.

== Awards and honours ==
In 1829, he became a Knight of the Order of Saint Stanislaus.

== Major projects ==
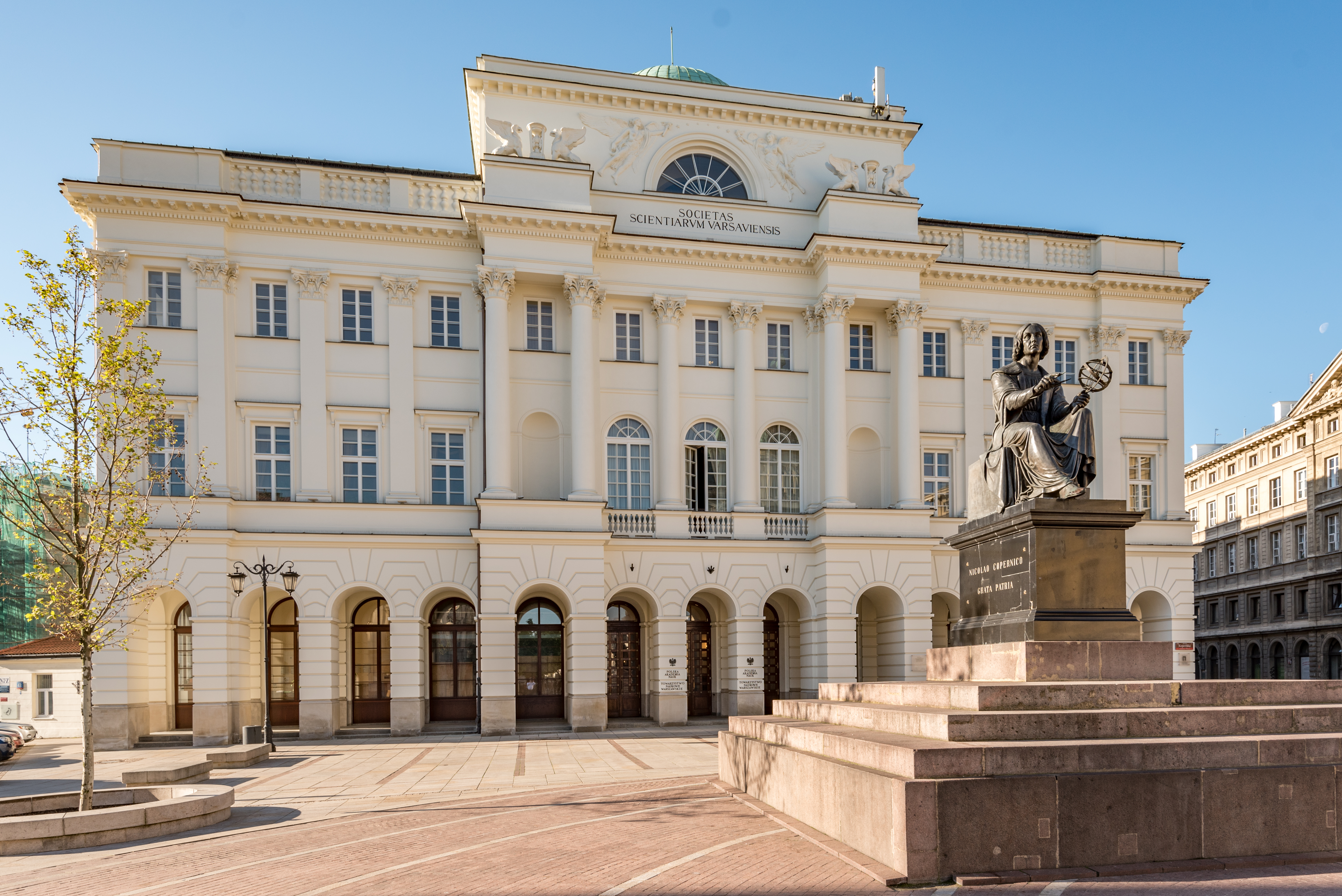
The Staszic Palace

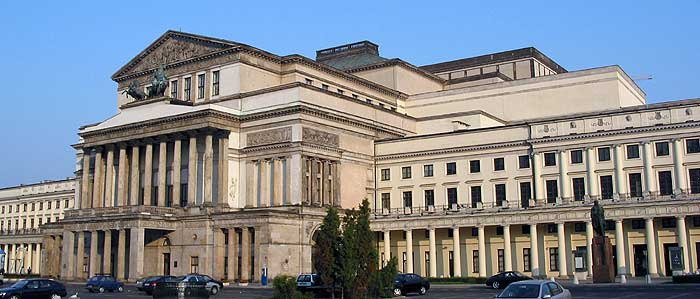
The restored Grand Theatre

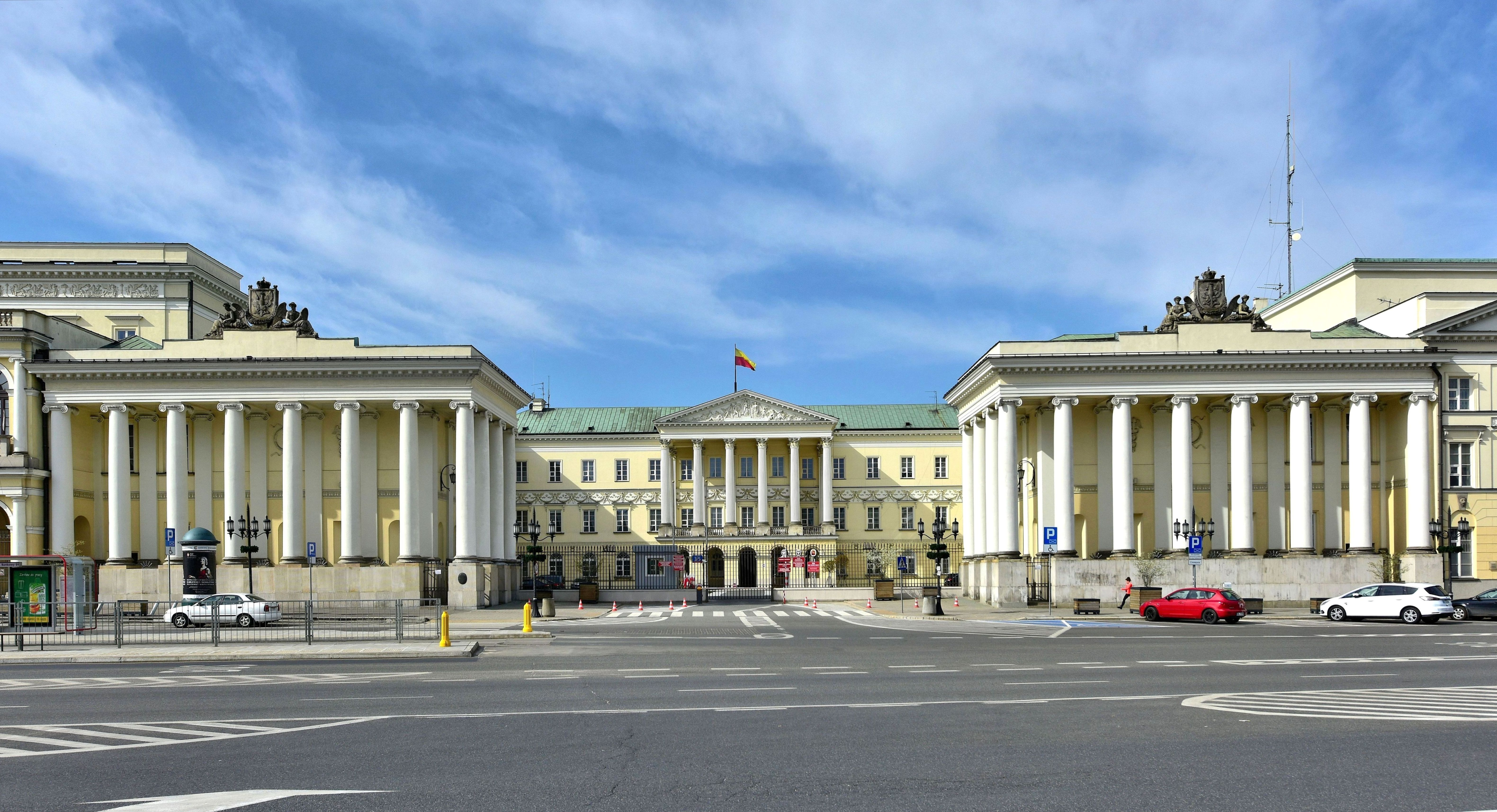
The Palace of the Ministry of Revenues and Treasury at Bank Square

- The Hołowczyc Palace in Warsaw (1820 – demolished 1912)
- The Palace of the Society of Friends of Science, the Staszic Palace (1820–1823)
- The Palace of the Government Commission of Internal Affairs and Police, the Mostowski Palace (1823–1824)
- The Water Board's offices (Gmach dawnej Komory Wodnej) in Warsaw (1824–1825)
- The Palace of the Government Commission of Revenues and Treasury in Warsaw (1823–1825)
- The Sandomierski Palace in Radom (Pałac Sandomierski) (1825–1827)
- The Post Office (Budynek Poczty Polskiej) in Siedlce (1827–1828)
- The Stock Exchange and Bank of Poland Building together with Jan Jakub Gay (1825)
- Tenement John Kulikiewicza in Warsaw (Ujazdów Avenue 49, 1828–1829)
- The Grand Theatre in Warsaw with Salami Redutowymi (1825–1833)
- The Maria Konopnicka Museum in Suwałki (1826–1827 and 1835–1836)
- Śleszyński Palace in Warsaw (1836)
- Rastawiecki Palace in Dołhobyczów (1837)
- Real Gymnasium (1841)
- Monument to the officers and loyalists killed in the November Uprising in Warsaw (1841 – destroyed 1917)
- CK Norwid High School in Radzymin (1845)
- Palace under the Artichoke (Pałac Pod Karczochem) in Warsaw
- The former theatre building in Siedlce
