= Wincenty Kasprzycki =

Polish painter and lithographer

- Born: Wincenty Kasprzycki; 1802
- Died: 27 May 1849; Warsaw, Poland
- Known for: Painting

Wincenty Kasprzycki (1802 – May 27, 1849, in Warsaw) was a Polish painter, and lithographer.

Wincenty Kasprzycki studied in Warsaw and Vilnius. He specialised in landscape paintings and vedute inter alia of Warsaw, Wilanów, Natolin, Morysin, Gucin, and the Powązki Cemetery. Many of his notable works such as the Portraits of the Puchałów (Portrety małżeństwa Puchałów) are characterised with staffages. He has also painted the interiors of buildings, such as the Fine Arts Exhibition in Warsaw in 1828 (Widok Wystawy Sztuk Pięknych w Warszawie w 1828 roku). His paintings are located at the Museum of King John III's Palace in Warsaw, Poznań, and Lwów. He mainly lithographed portraits. His great grandson Wincenty Kasprzycki (1906-1965) was a sculptor.

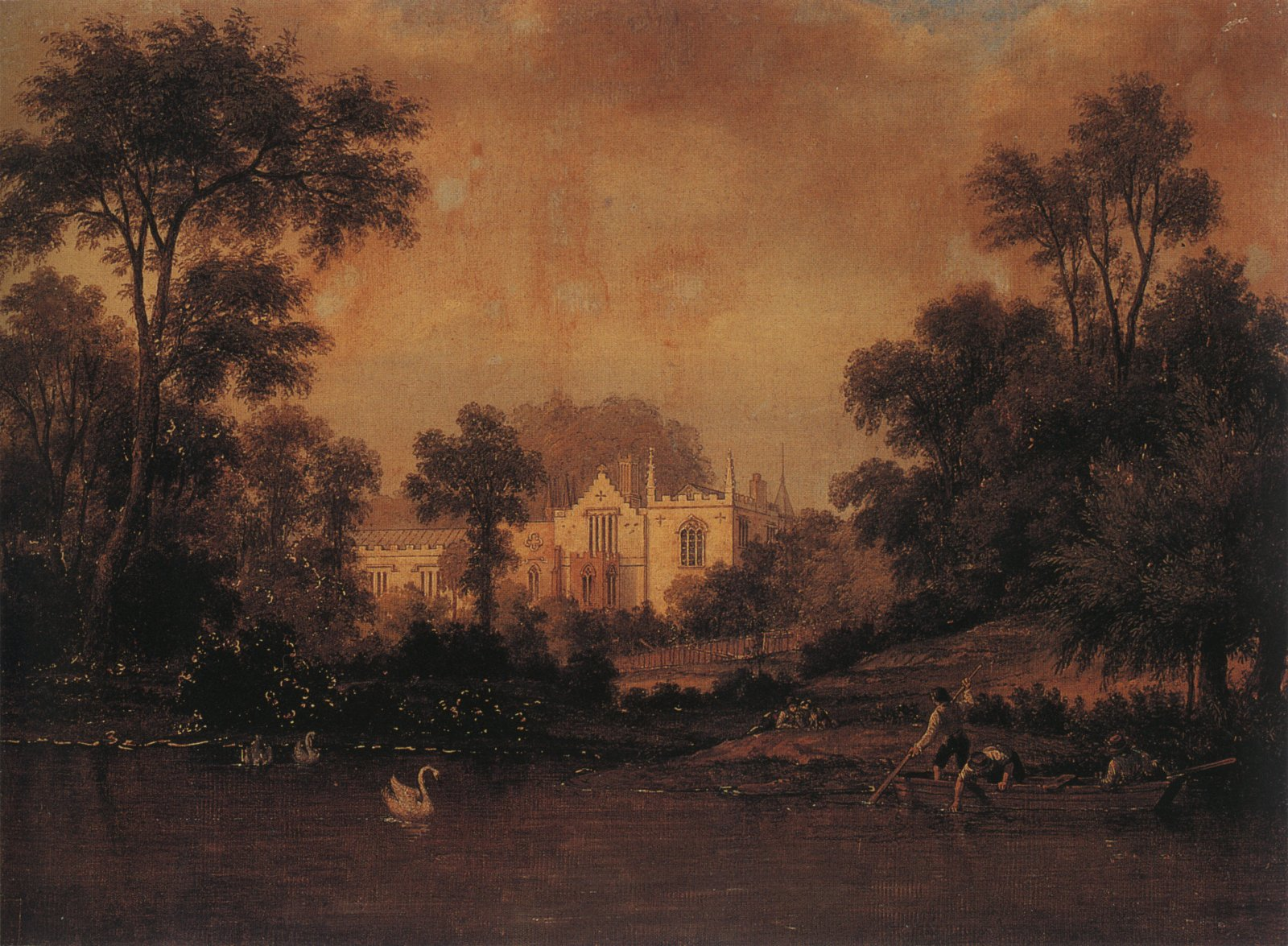
Windmill in Strawberry by the River Thames

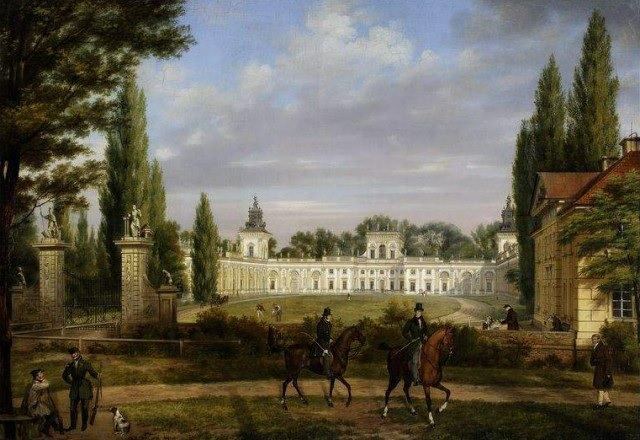
View of Wilanów Palace from the gateway
(1833)

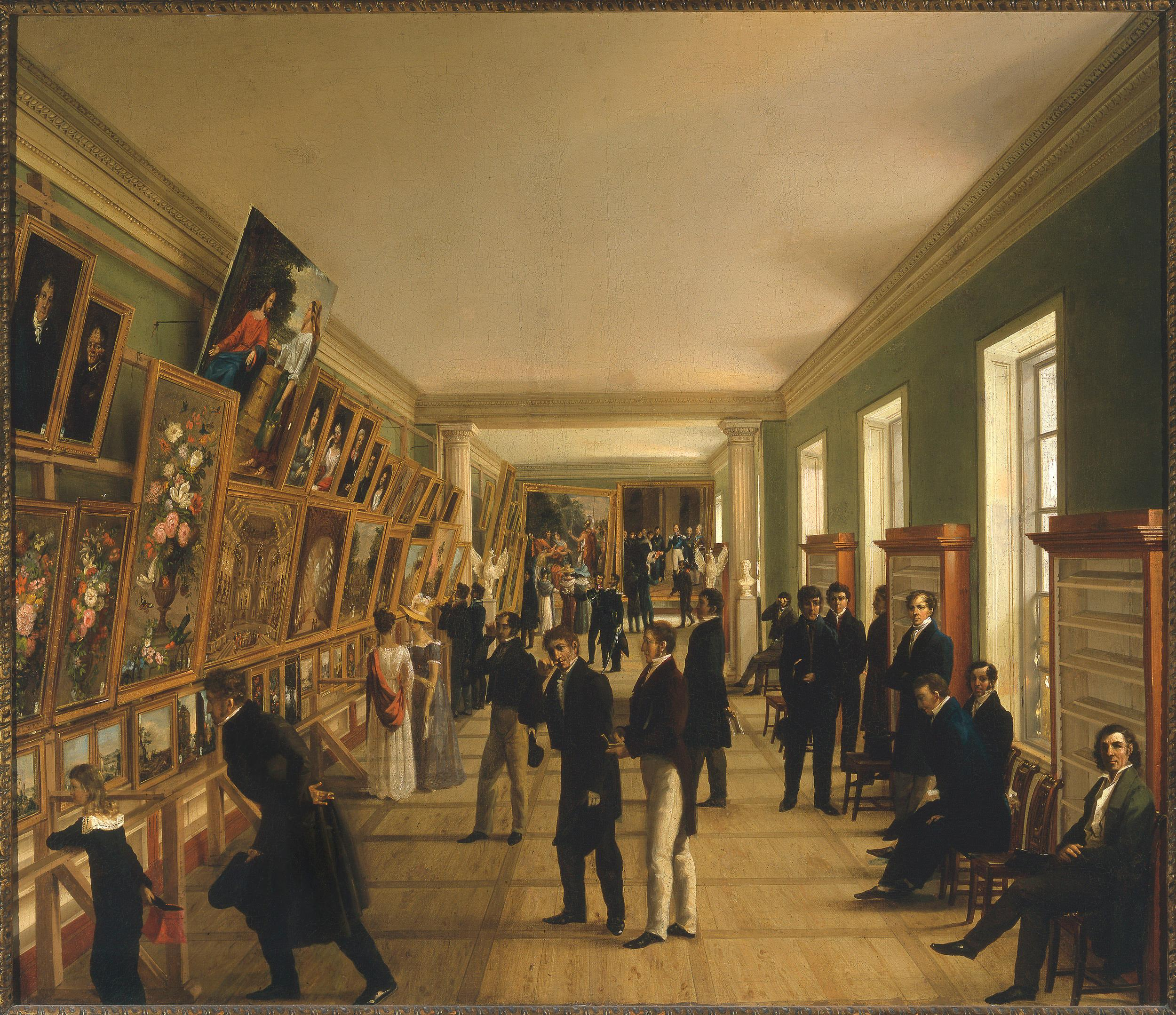
Kasprzycki Fine Arts Exhibition in Warsaw in 1828
(1828)

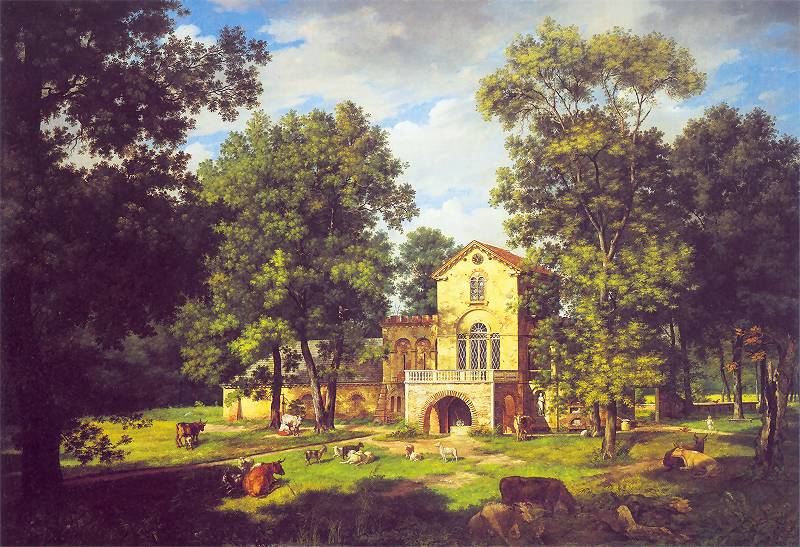
Palace in Natolin
(1833)
