= Bank Square, Warsaw =

Square in Warsaw

Coordinates: 52°14′35″N 21°0′8″E

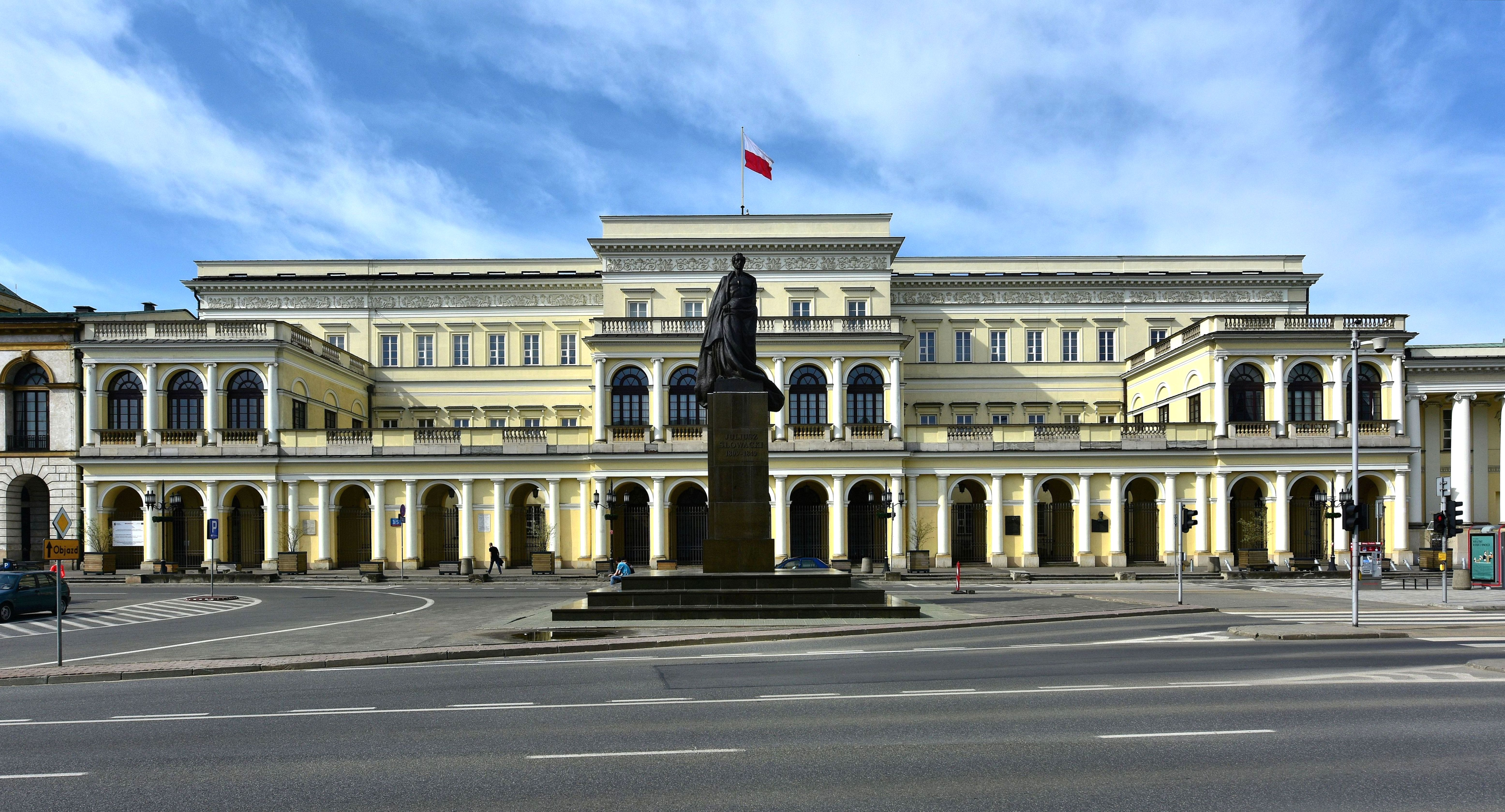
Bank Square today. The seat of the administration of Mazovia

Bank Square (Polish: Plac Bankowy, formerly Plac Dzierżyńskiego) is one of Warsaw's principal squares. Located in the downtown district, adjacent to the Saxon Garden and Warsaw Arsenal, it is also a principal public-transport hub, with bus and tram stops and a Warsaw Metro station.

== History ==
Created in the 19th century, under the Congress Kingdom, the square was designed to be an elegant area of the country's capital. Notable buildings included the Palace of the Ministry of Revenues and Treasury (a building reconstructed by Antonio Corazzi), the Bank of Poland and the Warsaw Stock Exchange (also by Corazzi). The square was originally triangular-shaped.

Between 1875 and 1878, the Great Synagogue was built on the eastern side of the square, across from the palace. At the time of its building, it was the largest synagogue in Warsaw and one of the largest in the world. After the Warsaw Ghetto Uprising in 1943, the Nazi occupiers blew up the building, destroying it.

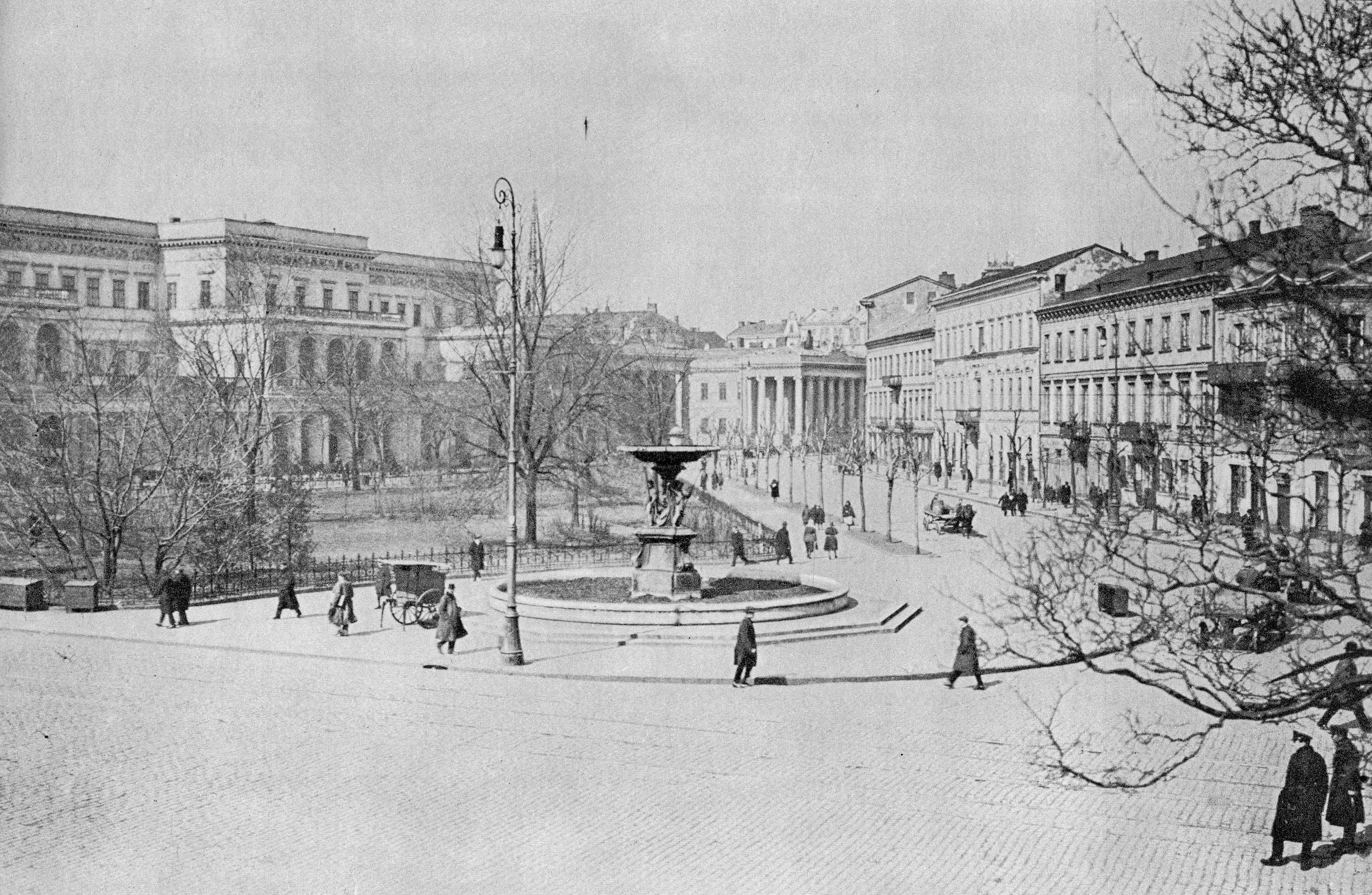
Bank Square before 1939

In the 1944 Warsaw Uprising, the remaining buildings on the square were destroyed. After the war, city planners reconstructed only its historic western part, changing it into a rectangle. The synagogue was not rebuilt and currently in the same location is the Błękitny Wieżowiec office building.

Under the communist Polish People's Republic, the square was renamed Plac Dzierżyńskiego (Dzierżyński's Square) after Felix Dzerzhinsky, a Polish-born communist politician and founder of the Bolshevik Cheka political police. In 1951, a monument to Dzierżyński (by Zbigniew Dunajewski) was erected in the southern part of the square. Four decades later, in 1989, the statue's toppling helped mark the fall of communism in Poland.

== Today ==
Bank Square's present-day landmarks include Błękitny Wieżowiec (the Blue Skyscraper), and the former seat of the Ministry of Treasury now serves as Warsaw's city hall, the seat of the President of Warsaw and the provincial office of the Mazovia province.

In 2001, a monument to Juliusz Słowacki, by Edward Wittig (actually designed in 1932), was erected on the spot previously occupied by the statue of Feliks Dzierżyński.

In front of the Błękitny Wieżowiec, there is a statue to Stefan Starzyński, the pre-World War II President of Warsaw, by Andrzej Renes.
