= Franciszek Ksawery Drucki-Lubecki =

Polish politician (1778–1846)

Prince Franciszek Ksawery Drucki-Lubecki
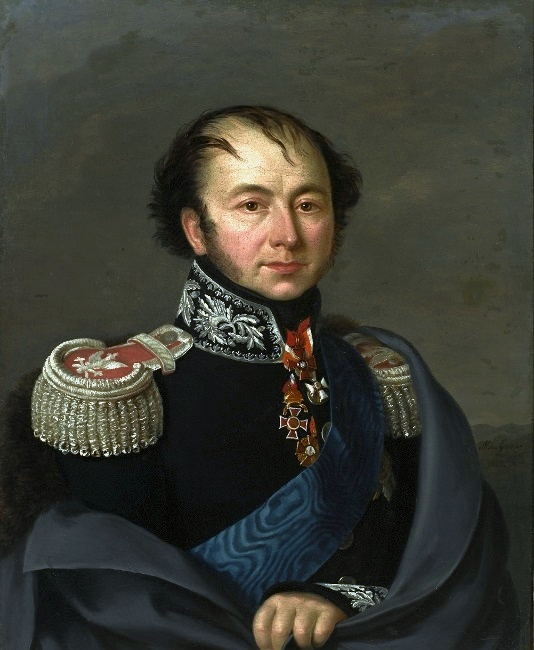
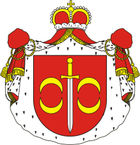
- Portrait by Marie Prévot Gomier
- Born: 4 January 1778; Pohost near Pińsk, Poland
- Died: 10 May 1846; Saint Petersburg, Russian Empire
- Father: Franciszek Drucki-Lubecki
- Mother: Genowefa Olizar-Wołczkiewicz

Prince Franciszek Ksawery Drucki-Lubecki (English: Francis Xavier Drucki-Lubecki. Russian: Ксаве́рий Фра́нцевич Дру́цкий-Любе́цкий; 4 January 1778–10 May 1846) was an important Polish politician, freemason and diplomat of the first half of the 19th century. He served as the minister of the treasury in the Congress Kingdom of Poland. He was nicknamed "Small Prince" because of his short height.

== Biography ==
Franciszek was born to Genowefa Olizar-Wołczkiewicz and Franciszek Drucki-Lubecki of the Drucki-Lubecki aristocratic family in Pohost Zahorodzki in Polesia (today's Pahost Zaharodski, a village in Brest Region, Belarus) on 4 January 1778. After graduation from an infantry cadet school he joined the Russian military in 1794 and remained in service until 1800. He served under the command of Alexander Suvorov and participated in his campaigns in Italy and Switzerland. Then he became the Marshal of Nobility of Grodno gubernia.

From 1813 to 1815 he was the member of the High Provisional Council (Rada Najwyższa Tymczasowa) of the Duchy of Warsaw. He supported the peaceful resolution of the conflict with Russian Empire and supported Alexander I of Russia, who he thought was liberal enough to support extended Polish autonomy. In 1816 he became the Governor General of Grodno gubernia and a member of the commission for settling the financial accounts between Kingdom of Poland and Russian Empire. He organised a campaign for the introduction of foreign investors, professionals and workers into Poland. In 1816, as a governor, he issued a set of conditions for the settlement of "useful foreigners" in the Congress Kingdom of Poland. City of Łódź was one that greatly benefited from his policies, becoming an important textile center.

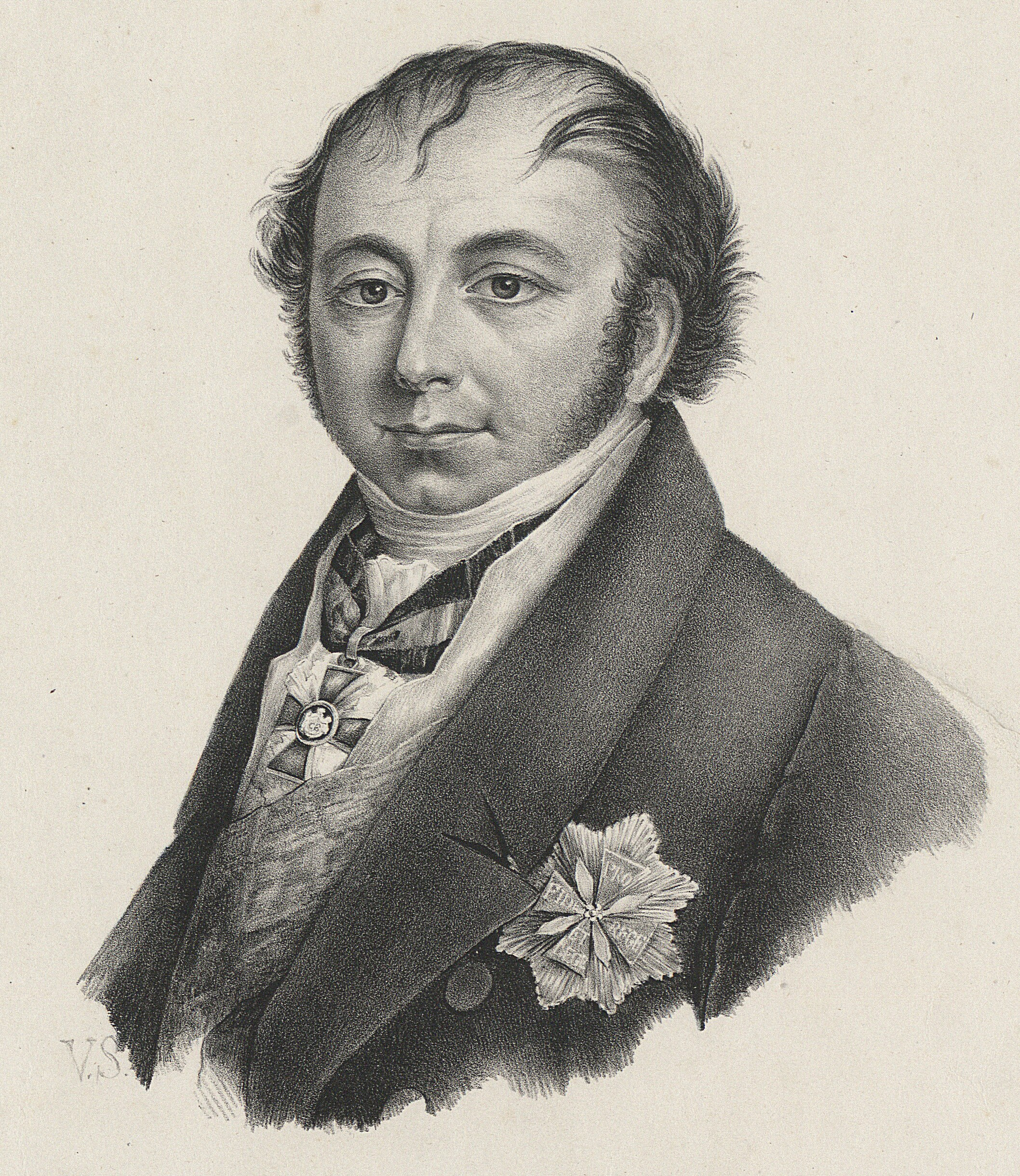
Drawing by Walenty Śliwicki

On 20 June 1820 he married Maria Scipio del Campo. They had three daughters: Tekla Drucka-Lubecka, Genowefa Drucka-Lubecka and Julia Drucka-Lubecka.

From 1821 to 1830 he was the minister of Treasure in the Kingdom of Poland. From 1824 he reformed the mining and ironworks industries. His policies significantly improved the budget and treasury of the Kingdom: he introduced many saving policies, improved tax collection, introduced new indirect taxes and expanded the national monopoly on salt and tobacco. He eliminated the budgetary deficit and using his connections in Russia he eliminated many tariffs between the Kingdom of Poland and proper Russian Empire. This has improved the Polish exports eastwards. He also protected new industries from western import, especially from Germany, which led to a tariff war with Prussia. He founded the National Bank of Poland in 1828, he was also the initiator of the Land Credit Society (Towarzystwo Kredytowe Ziemskie). Drucki was convinced of harmfulness of laissez-faire policies and supported state interventionism.

He represented the political faction known as 'Conciliators', which believed that Polish independence may come only through economic growth and diplomacy, not military adventures. However the Conciliators were handicapped not only by their domestic opponents, the 'Insurrectionist' faction, but by the Russian imperial authorities themselves who rarely saw the need to compromise with a defeated, weak enemy. In the second half of the 19th century such line of thought would be continued by the positivists, and later by the endecja movement. Therefore, Drucki opposed the November Uprising against the Russia, which he deemed as folly and a dangerous gambit which would lose all that has been achieved over the past decade. During the uprising he attempted to negotiate with Russian authorities, but to no avail. After the defeat of the uprising - which, incidentally, was sponsored by money Drucki gathered in the nation's treasury - he left Poland but still remained in the Polish government, becoming a member of the new, now much more Russian-controlled, National Council.

Since December 1830 he worked in Saint Petersburg on the legal reform for Poland. Since 1832 he became a member of State Council of Imperial Russia and in 1834 he worked on settling the financial accounts between Russia and France. After 1830 he never returned to Poland.

He died on 10 May 1846 in Saint Petersburg in the Russian Empire.

Ksawera quarter in Będzin is named after him. There is also a non-governmental think tank in Poland, dedicated to the worlds of business and academics.

== Honours and awards ==
In 1816 Franciszek was awarded the Polish Order of the White Eagle and, in 1815, he was awarded the Russian Order of St. Vladimir.

== See also ==
- Adam Czartoryski
- Aleksander Wielopolski
- Stanisław Staszic
- Hipolit Cegielski
