= Edward Wittig =

Polish sculptor (1879–1941)

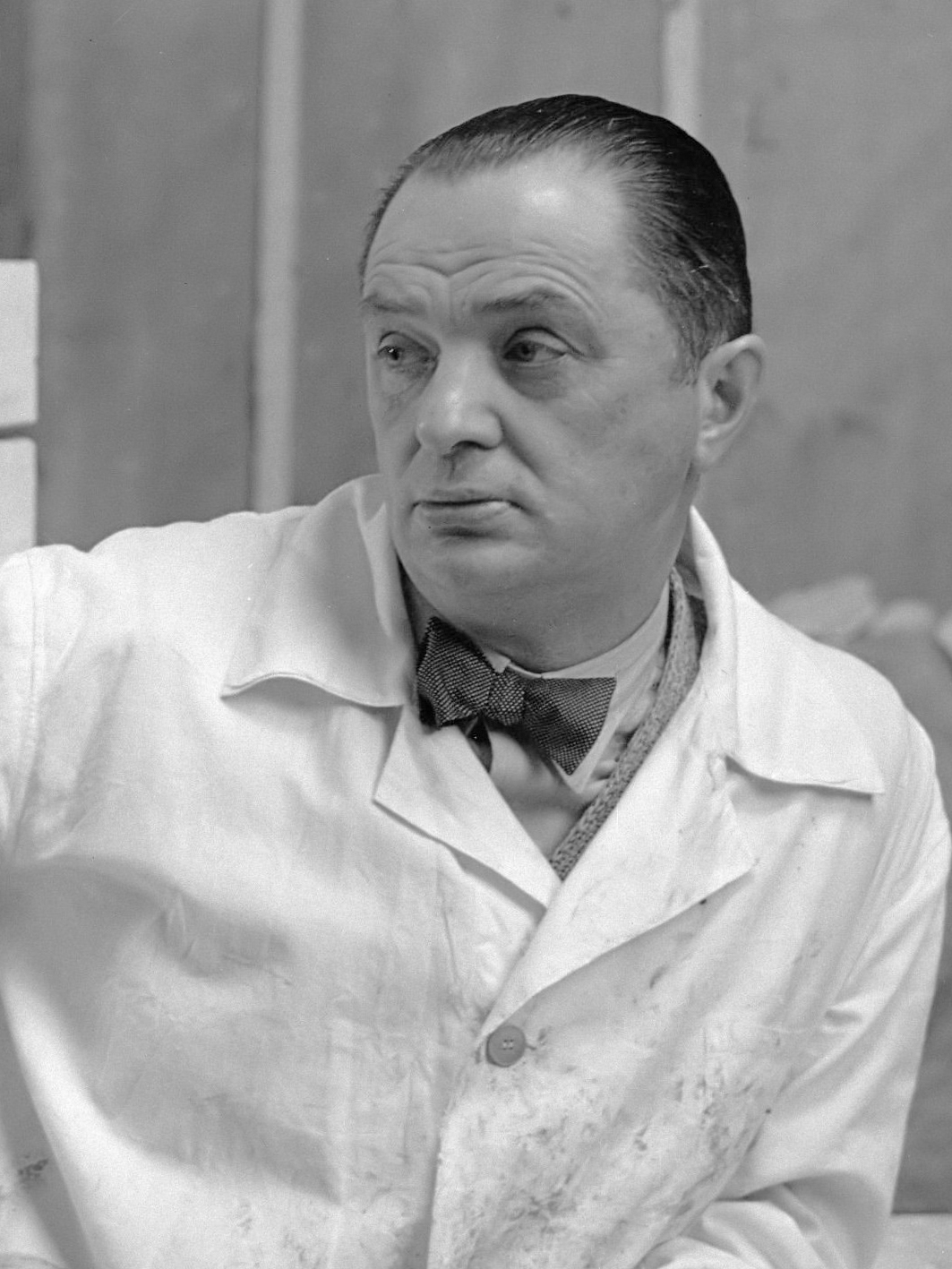
Edward Wittig (1934)

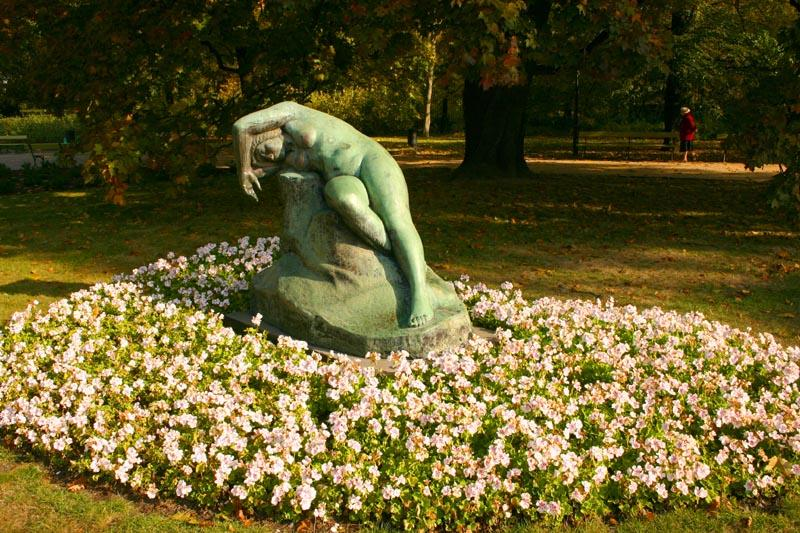
Wittig's sculpture of Ewa, in Warsaw's Park Ujazdowski.

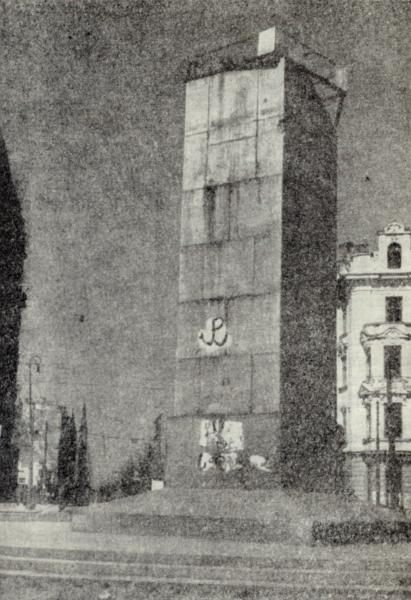
Pedestal of the 1932 Aviator Monument in 1942, after Wittig's sculpture had been removed by the Germans. The Kotwica (Polish resistance "Anchor") was painted on the pedestal.

Edward Wittig (September 20, 1879 – March 3, 1941) was a Polish sculptor and university professor, notable for designing many monuments in Warsaw.

Born in Warsaw, Wittig went on to study art at the Academy of Fine Arts Vienna under the tutelage of J. Tautenheim between 1897 and 1900. He then moved to Paris, where he graduated from the École des Beaux-Arts. His tutor there was Madeleine Jouvray, a pupil of Auguste Rodin and Lucien Schnegg. One of his friends during this period was Magnus Enckell. In 1909 he returned to Poland and settled in Podolia, in a residence owned by friends. There he prepared a number of sculptures, some of which were presented at the Paris Salon. After 1903, he was invited to display his work at many top art galleries. His works were also featured at the Zachęta gallery in Warsaw (since 1900), at the Society of Friends of Fine Arts of Kraków, and the Venice Biennale in 1920 and 1934.

Between 1915 and 1920, he was one of the professors of the Academy of Fine Arts in Warsaw, and was subsequently a professor at the Warsaw University of Science and Technology. Initially a student of Rodin, in the early 1900s Wittig developed his own style, with stronger contrasts and less symbolism. Finally, prior to World War I his style became heavily influenced by Aristide Maillol and the so-called New Classicism, which emphasised monumental, cubic, and rough silhouettes lacking detail. Among the first such sculptures is Eve of 1911, featured in both Trocadéro garden in Paris and the Park Ujazdowski in Warsaw.

In the 1920s, Wittig's style became very popular in Poland and abroad, mostly due to its monumentalism, which was a leading trend in Polish architecture of the 1920s and 1930s. As a result of which he went on to create numerous monuments. Among the most notable is the monuments to Polish Military Organization in front of the Zachęta. It was destroyed by the Germans prior to the Warsaw Uprising, but reconstructed in 1999. Another notable work is the 1931 monument to World War I airmen. The Germans destroyed it by removing the sculpture from the top of its pedestal in 1940, but it was rebuilt in 1968 by Alfred Jesion. In 1932, Wittig also prepared the monument to Juliusz Słowacki, which was not erected until 2001, well after his death in Warsaw in 1941, during the Nazi and Soviet occupation of Poland.
