= Janina Porazińska Park =

Urban park in Warsaw, Poland

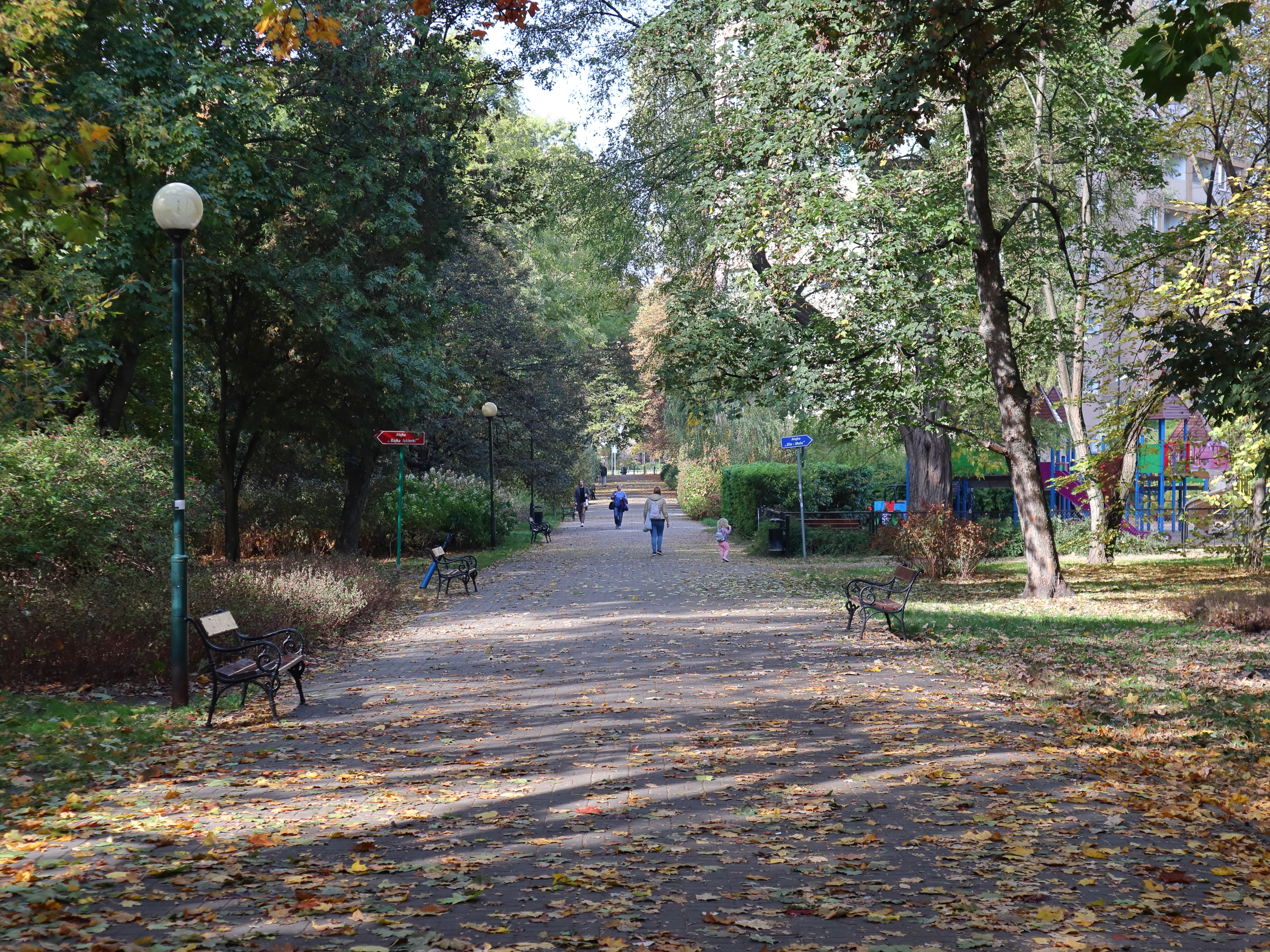
- Psotki i Śmieszki Avenue in Porazińska Park in 2022.
- Type: Urban park
- Location: Downtown, Warsaw, Poland
- Coordinates: 52.232410°N 21.033710°E
- Created: 29 September 2011

Janina Porazińska Park (Note: Polish pronunciation: [jaˈɲi.na pɔˈra.ʑiɲ.ska]; Polish: Park Janiny Porazińskiej, Park im. Janiny Porazińskiej) is an urban park in Warsaw, Poland. It is located in the neighbourhood of Solec in the Downtown district, between Kruczkowskiego, Solec, and Ludna Streets, and Trzeciego Maja Avenue. The park was opened in 2011.

== History ==
The park was opened on 29 September 2011, and named after Janina Porazińska, a 20th-century children's book author.

== Characteristics ==
The park is located in the neighbourhood of Solec in the Downtown district, between Kruczkowskiego, Solec, and Ludna Streets, and Trzeciego Maja Avenue.

The park alleys are named after titles of Porazińska's children's books. They were chosen by the students of the local primary schools. There are also the sculptures of characters from books Psotki i Śmieszki and Kichuś majstra Lepigliny. Additionally, the park features a bench, which can play audiobooks of three Porazińska's children's books.
