= Marshal Edward Rydz-Śmigły Park =

Park in Warsaw, Poland

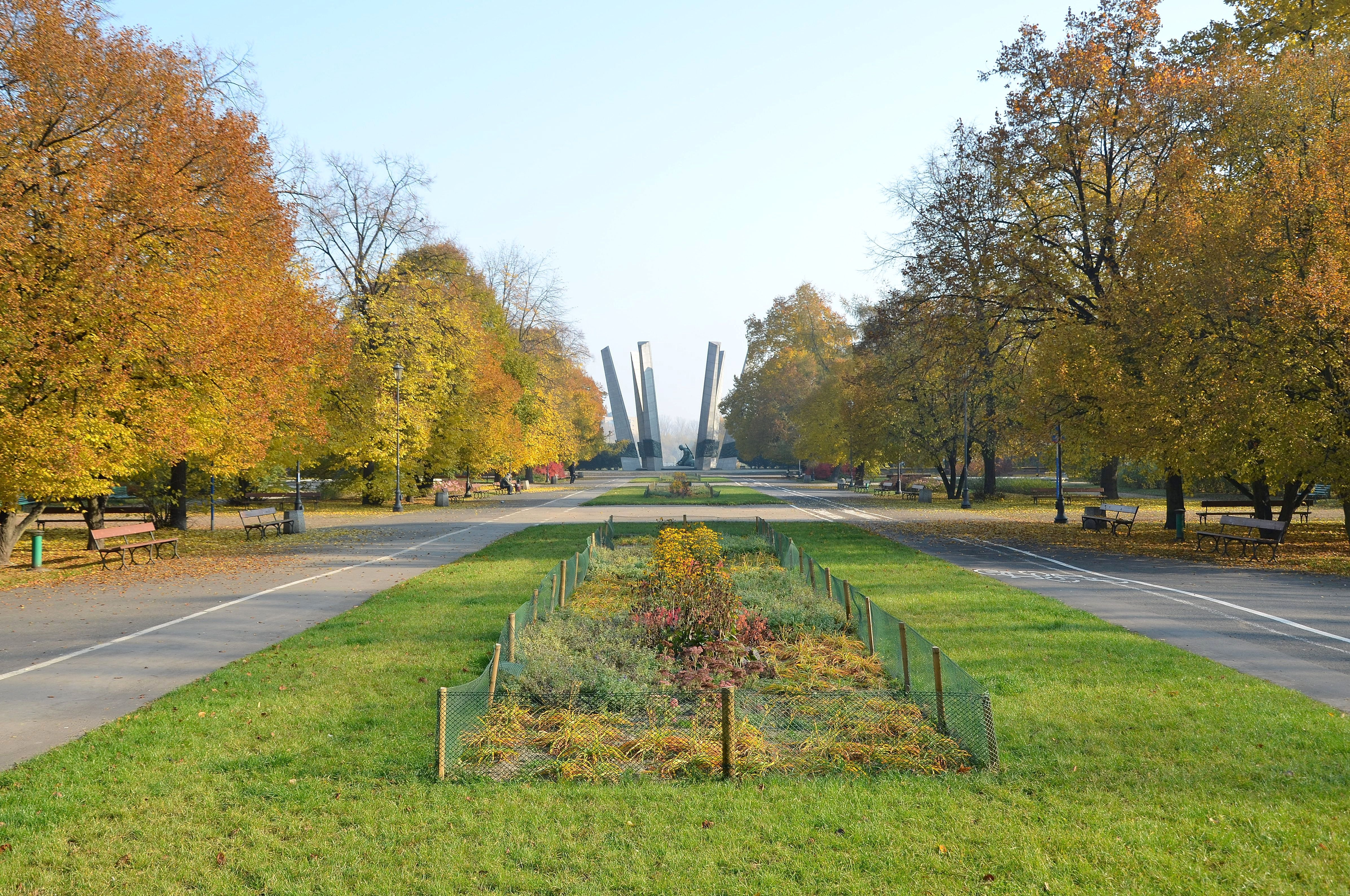
- Interactive map of Marshal Edward Rydz-Śmigły Park
- Type: Municipal
- Location: Warsaw, Poland
- Coordinates: 52°13′42″N 21°01′46″E
- Area: 53 hectares (130 acres)
- Created: 22 July 1955, 1964
- Status: Open all year

Marshal Edward Rydz-Śmigły Park is a major parkland in the historic Frascati and Solec neighbourhoods of central Warsaw, Poland. It is situated in the administrative South Downtown (Śródmieście Południowe) district, on the western bank of the Vistula river. The 53-hectare park opened on 22 July 1955 and was continuously enlarged up until 1964.

== History ==
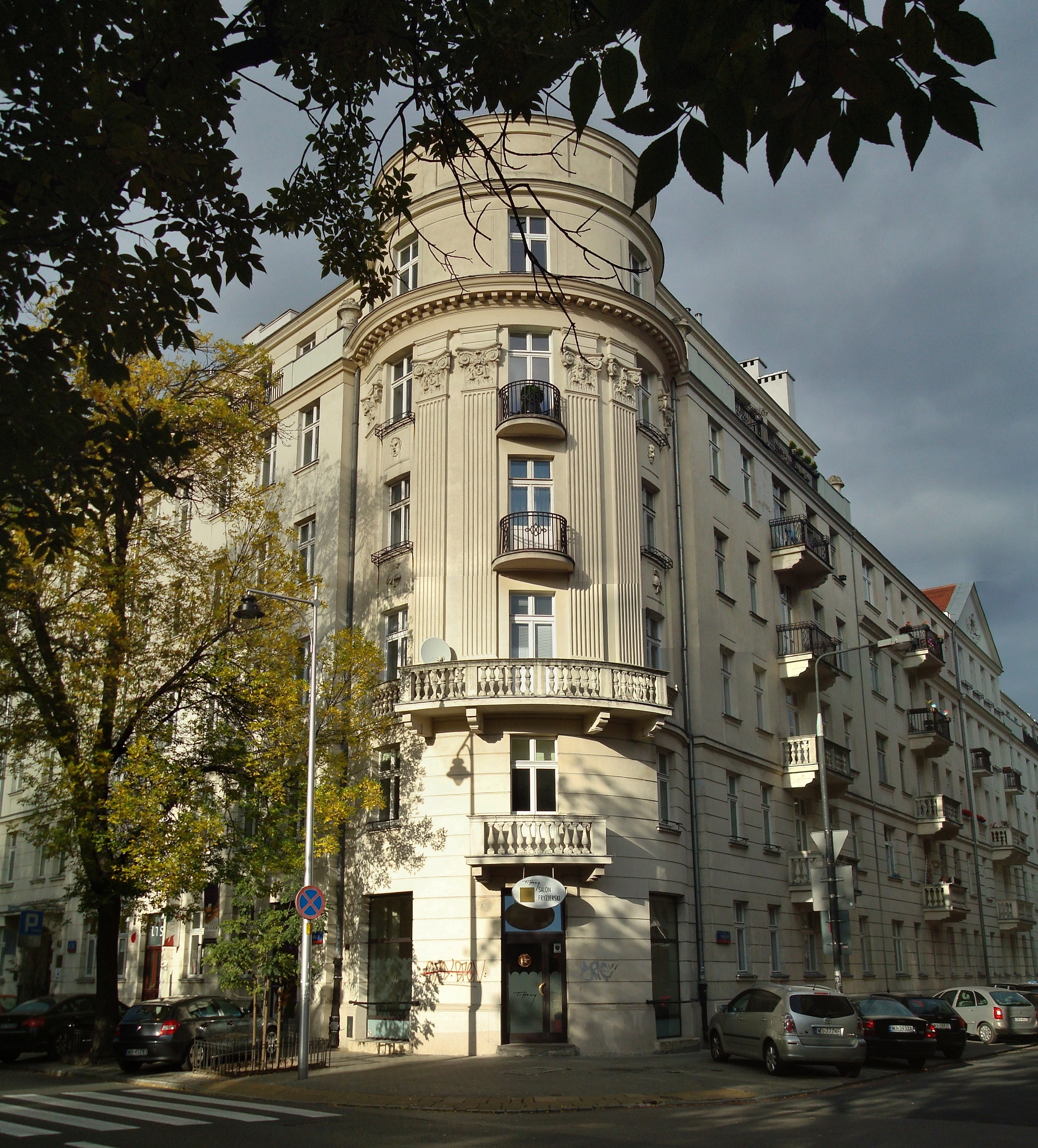
Tenements at Rozbrat Street, which passes through the parkland

The park was founded on the former estate of prince Kazimierz Poniatowski (1721–1800), lord chamberlain of the Polish–Lithuanian Commonwealth and brother of Poland's last king Stanisław II Augustus. The previous palatial gardens were designed by renowned architect Szymon Bogumił Zug. When the property passed to the aristocratic Branicki family, a large Renaissance Revival-styled residence was erected on the site, which became known as the "Red Palace" (Czerwony Pałac). The building hosted the offices of the French Embassy until its destruction in World War II. The sole remainder of the palace today are two grand staircases with decorative balustrades and an elevated terrace which once overlooked the gardens.

The project of creating a new central parkland to the once-densely populated suburb was initiated in 1952. The majority of the pre-war dwellings were either completely destroyed or had to be demolished in the post-war years due to their structural vulnerability and poor design.

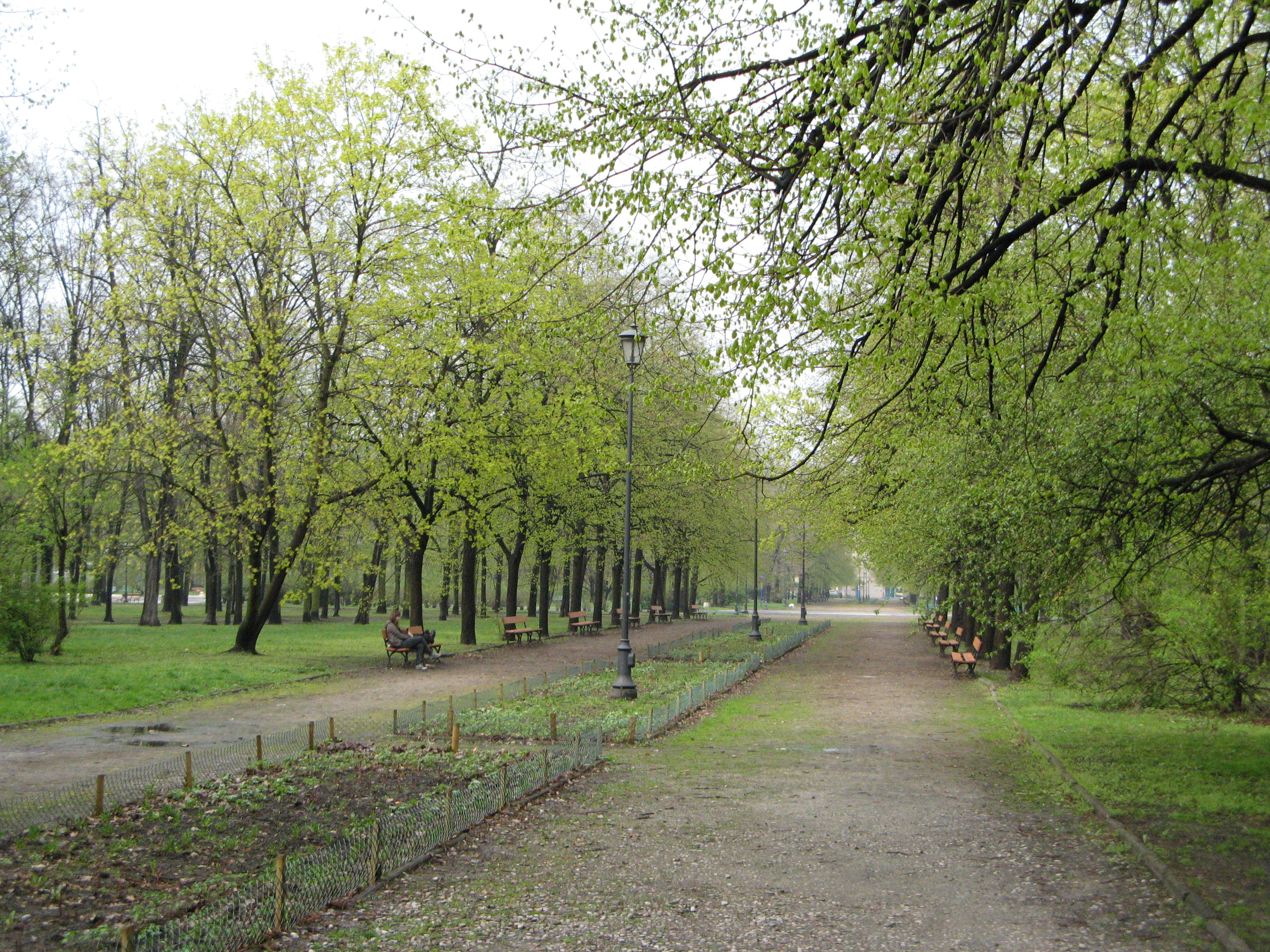
One of the park's alleys

The chief landscape architects who composed the layout of the new park were Alina Scholtz, Zygmunt Stępiński and Longin Majdecki. The main alley was opened in 1955; the site was subsequently extended into the adjacent Solec neighbourhood, closer to the riverside. Up to 1992, the parkland grounds were collectively known as the "Central Park of Culture" (Centralny Park Kultury). With the fall of communism, the new authorities decided to rename the parkland in honour of Poland's marshal and military commander in World War II, Edward Rydz-Śmigły.

== Sights ==
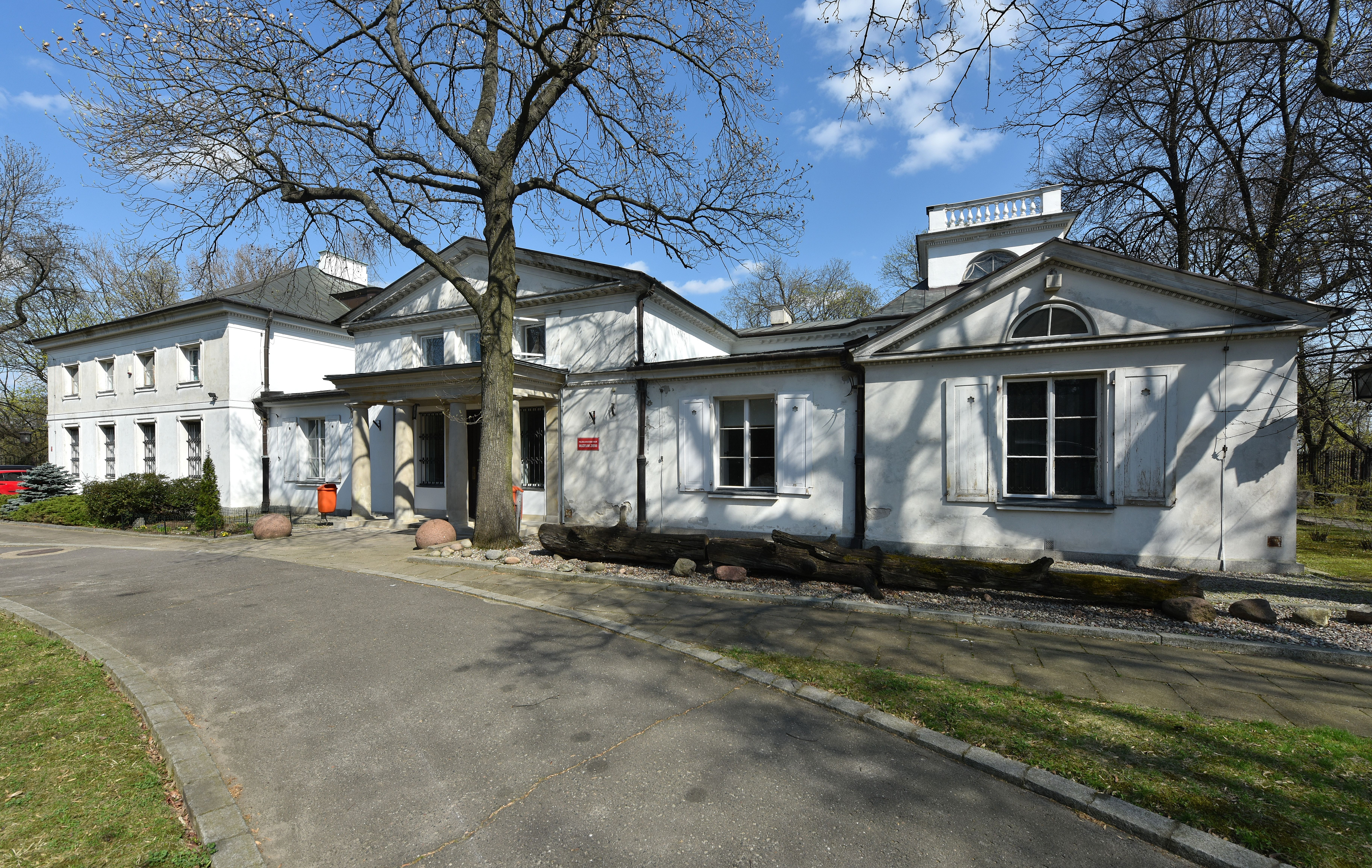
Little White Palace, seat of the Museum of the Earth

- Museum of the Earth of the Polish Academy of Sciences (Muzeum Ziemi PAN), situated in the Little White Palace (Biały Pałacyk) on Na Skarpie Street.
- "Unity" Monument, representing the bond between the Poles in Chicago and Warsaw as well as the relations between the United States and Poland. Erected in 2012.
- Glory to Sappers Monument (Pomnik Chwała Saperom), honouring the sappers employed in the demining of Warsaw and Poland after the Second World War. Erected in 1975.
- Iringh Square (Skwer M. Iringha), honouring Mirosław Iringh and the Slovakian battalion (Platoon 535) which fought in the Warsaw Uprising in 1944.
- Restaurants, cafes and historical pre-war tenements at Rozbrat Street.
- Playground area at Wilanowska Street.
- Jutrzenka Skatepark
- Zbigniew Ścibor-Rylski Monument

== See also ==
- Frascati
- Solec
- Powiśle, Warsaw
- Mariensztat
- Mokotów Field
