= Statue of Wanda Tazbir =

Monument in Warsaw, Poland

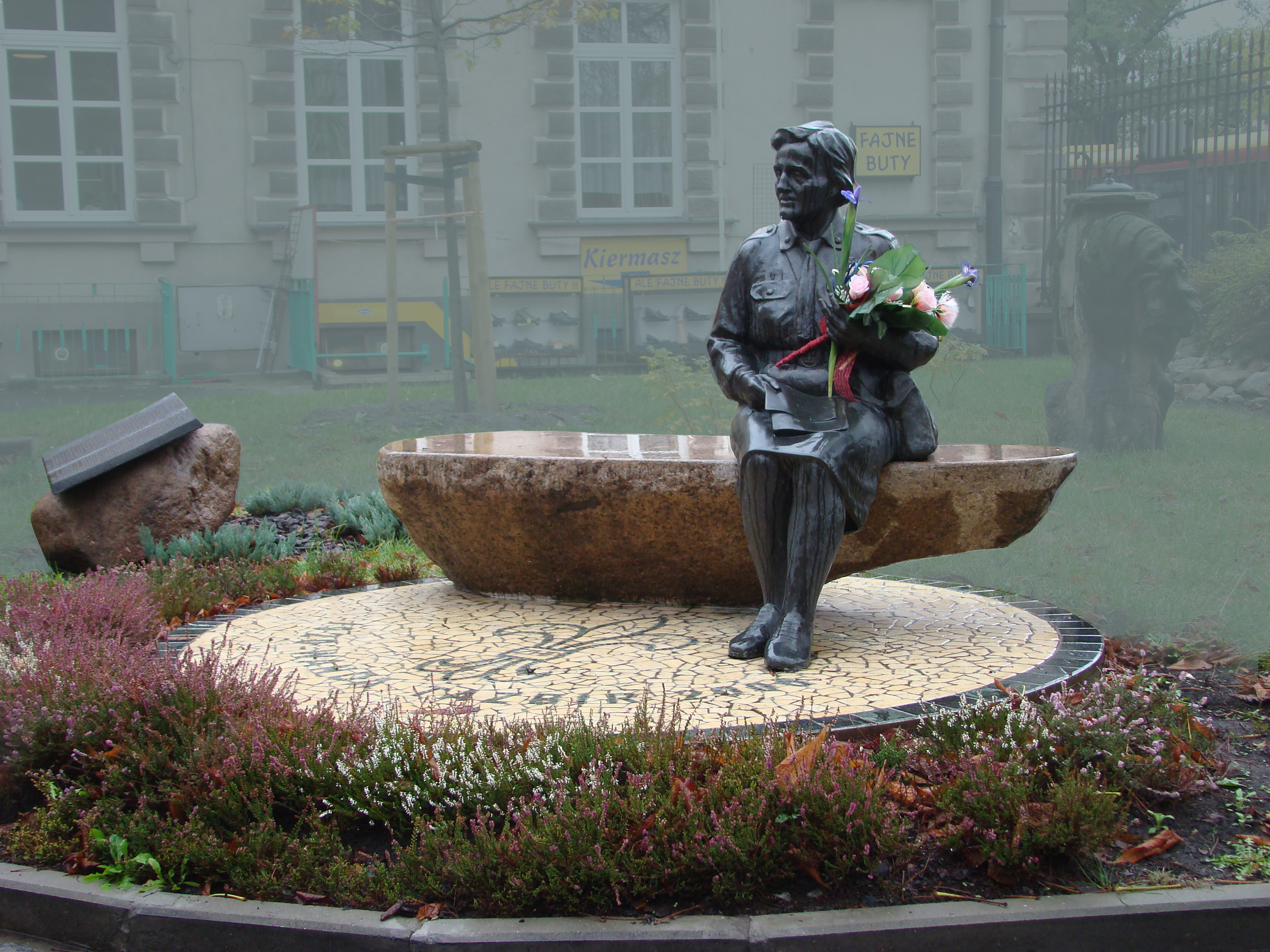
- The monument in 2009.
- Interactive map of Statue of Wanda Tazbir
- Location: 4/6 Three Crosses Square, Downtown, Warsaw, Poland
- Coordinates: 52°13′42.86″N 21°01′24.90″E
- Type: Statue, bench monument
- Material: Bronze (statue); stone (bench)
- Opening date: 21 October 2007
- Dedicated to: Wanda Tazbir

The statue of Wanda Tazbir (Polish: Pomnik Wandy Tazbir) is a bronze statue in Warsaw, Poland, placed in front of the Institute for the Deaf at 4/6 Three Crosses Square in the South Downtown neighbourhood. It is dedicated to Wanda Tazbir (1920–2006), a teacher of the Institute for the Deaf, instructor of the Polish Scouting and Guiding Association, and a participant of the Warsaw Uprising during the Second World War, and later a soldier of the Royal Air Force. It was unveiled on 21 October 2007, on the 90th anniversary of the founding of the Institute for the Deaf.

== Design ==
The monument consists of a bronze statue of Wanda Tazbir in a scouting uniform, sitting on a bench, made from a stone with its upper half cut of and polished. On her lap are placed cards of paper, with an inscription of a human hand forming a gesture, which, in the Polish Sign Language, means "I love you. At her feet is a circle with stone mosaic, featuring the World Scout Emblem, in form of a fleur-de-lis, and inscription which reads "1920 Wanda Tazbir 2006". To her right is placed a large bronze sculpture of an open book, with inscriptions in Polish, English, and Hebrew. The first is included on the left page, and latter, on the right page. They read:

Polish inscription:
Wanda Tazbir. Pseudonimy konspiracyjne: Dobrochna Suliborska i Dopływ, żołnierz AK, Harcmistrz ZHP, komendantka Szczepu „Tęcza”, Kawaler Orderu Uśmiechu, w swojej skromności najszlachetniejszej wielki przyjaciel głuchych. Druhna Wanda Tazbirówna, będąc jeszcze uczennicą Liceum im. Królowej Jadwigi, rozpoczęła w 1937 r. pracę harcerską w Instytucie. Po wybuchu wojny w 1939 r. włączyła się w pracę konspiracyjną: była instruktorką sanitariuszek i nauczycielką tajnego nauczania. Z narażeniem życia ratowała Żydów, za co została odznaczona medalem „Sprawiedliwy wśród Narodów Świata”, a w 2002 r. otrzymała tytuł Honorowej Obywatelki Izraela. Uczestniczyła w Powstaniu Warszawskim. Po kapitulacji więziona była w niemieckich obozach jenieckich. W 1945 r. została żołnierzem RAF w Anglii. W 1947 r. wróciła do Polski i natychmiast włączyła się w pracę harcerską. W ciągu ponad 60-ciu lat pracy wychowała tysiące niesłyszących harcerzy i liczne grono instruktorów. Wszystkim przekazywała zasady skautingu, uczyła miłości do Polski, braterstwa i poszanowania każdego człowieka. Nikomu nigdy nie odmówiła pomocy. Organizowała spotkania, podczas których opowiadała młodzieży polskiej i żydowskiej o okrutnych latach wojny, o holocauście, o Powstaniu Warszawskim. Druhna Wanda Tazbirówna ukochała postać ks. Jakuba Falkowskiego założyciela Instytutu Głuchoniemych, a swoje życie bez reszty poświęciła jego wychowankom.

English inscription:
Wanda Tazbir. Alias: Dobrochna Suliborska and Dopływ, AK soldier, chief Instructor of ZHP (The Polish Scouting and Guiding Association), commander of scout troop 'Rainbow', Knight of the Order of the Smile; in her modesty, the most noble friend of the Deaf. Girl Scout Wanda Tazbir, being a student of the Queen Jadwiga high school, started scouting work in the Institute for the Deaf in 1937, after the outbreak of the Second World War in 1939, she became involved in secret work as an instructor of volunteer nurses and underground teacher. Putting her life at risk, she saved Jews, for which, she was granted the titled of the Righteous Among the Nations and, in 2002, the title of Honorary Citizen of Israel. Tazbir was a participant in he Warsaw Rising and after the surrender was detained in German prison camps. In 1945, she joined the RAF in England. In 1947, she returned to Poland and immediately became involved in scouting activity. During over 60 years of her work, Tazbir trained thousands of deaf scouts and a large number of instructors to whom she was imparting the rules of scouting and love of Poland as well as brotherhood and mutual respect. She never refused her help to anybody. Last but not least, she organized meetings at which she taught Polish and Jewish youths about the cruelties of wartime, holocaust, and the Warsaw Rising. Girl Scout Wanda Tazbir admired the figure of priest Jakub Falkowski, founder of the Institute for the Deaf and she devoted her entire life to his pupils.
