= Frascati, Warsaw =

Historic part of Warsaw

Frascati
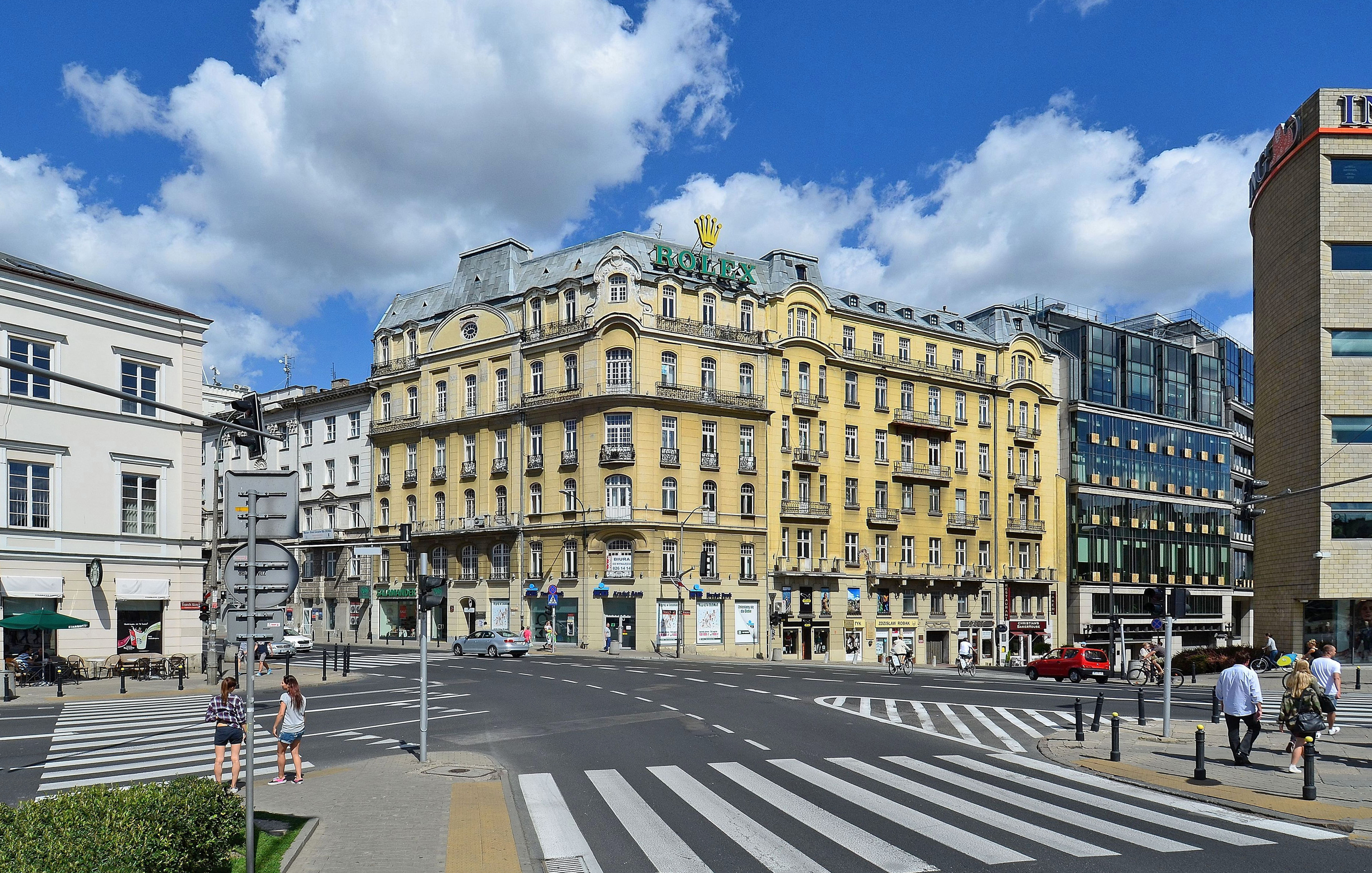
- Three Crosses Square is the westernmost part of Frascati. The Warsaw Stock Exchange is to the right.
- Interactive map of Frascati
- Coordinates: 52.2299°N 21.0223°E
- Time zone: +2

Frascati (Polish: [fraˈskati]) is a historic neighbourhood and inner-suburb in central Warsaw, the capital of Poland. The area extends eastward from the Three Crosses Square and covers the broad parkland and housing estates surrounding Frascati and Nullo streets, located between the Polish parliament building, the Warsaw Stock Exchange and the National Museum. The neighbourhood was named after the Italian city of Frascati.

== History ==
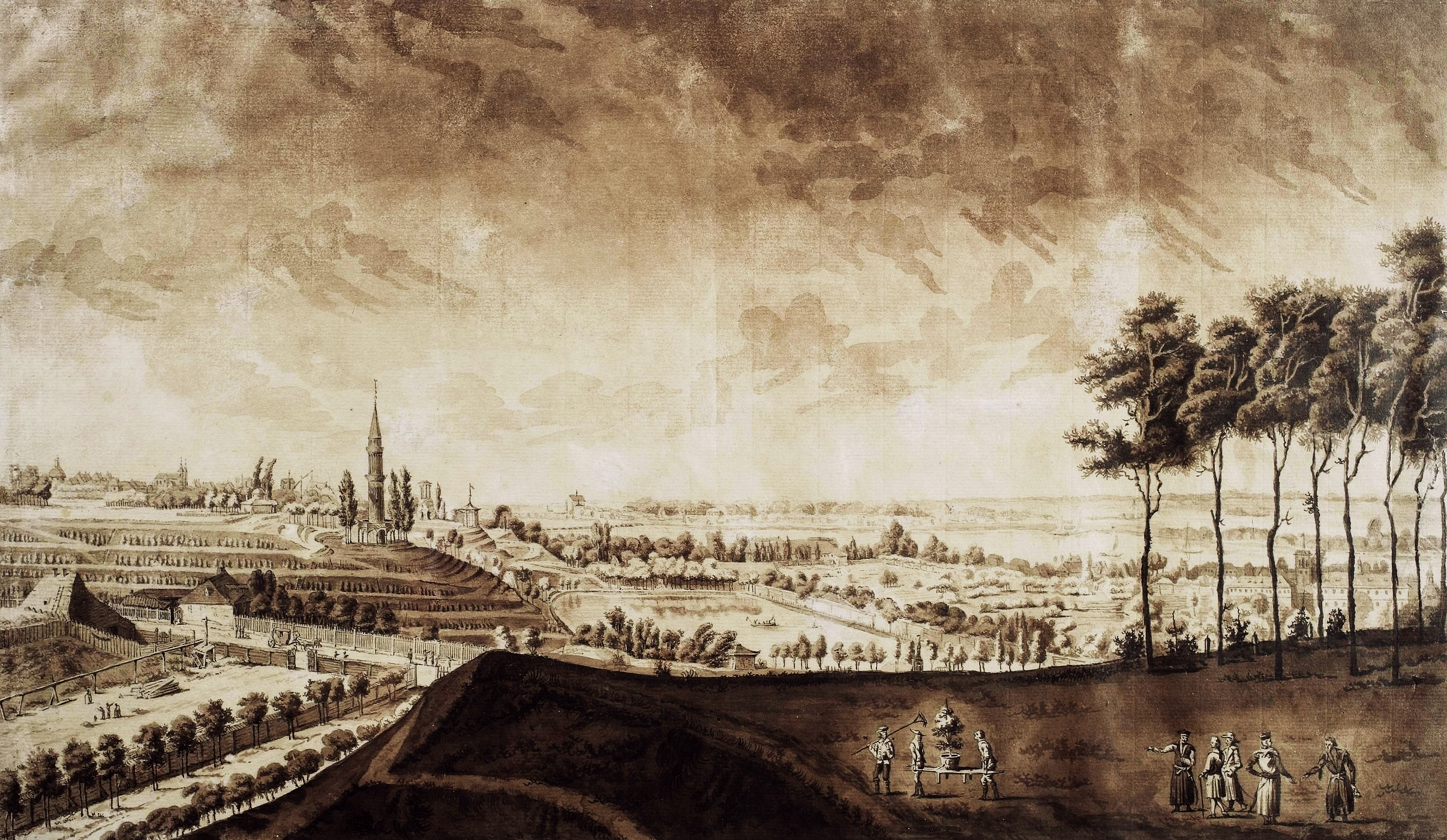
View of Poniatowski's estates in 1789, by Zygmunt Vogel. The 15-metre minaret and pavilions can be seen to the centre-left

The history of Frascati dates back to 1779, when a road was constructed from Wiejska Street to the private palace of prince Kazimierz Poniatowski (1721–1800), lord chamberlain of the Polish–Lithuanian Commonwealth and brother of king Stanisław II Augustus. The sole remainder of that residence is the so-called Little White Palace (Biały Pałacyk) situated on Na Skarpie Street. The complex currently houses the Museum of the Earth of the Polish Academy of Sciences. The extensive gardens that once adorned the palace were designed by Szymon Bogumił Zug and are now occupied by the 53-hectare Marshal Edward Rydz-Śmigły Park (often simplified to Marshal Rydz Park). In the early 19th century, French restaurateur Simon Chovot founded a recreational and entertainment park on Poniatowski's estates. The subsequent owners of the property, the aristocratic Branicki family, built a larger Renaissance Revival-styled chateau, which became known as the Red Palace (Czerwony Pałac) due to its clinker brick exterior. Designed by Leandro Marconi, the palace housed the French Embassy to Poland until 1939 and was eventually destroyed during World War II.

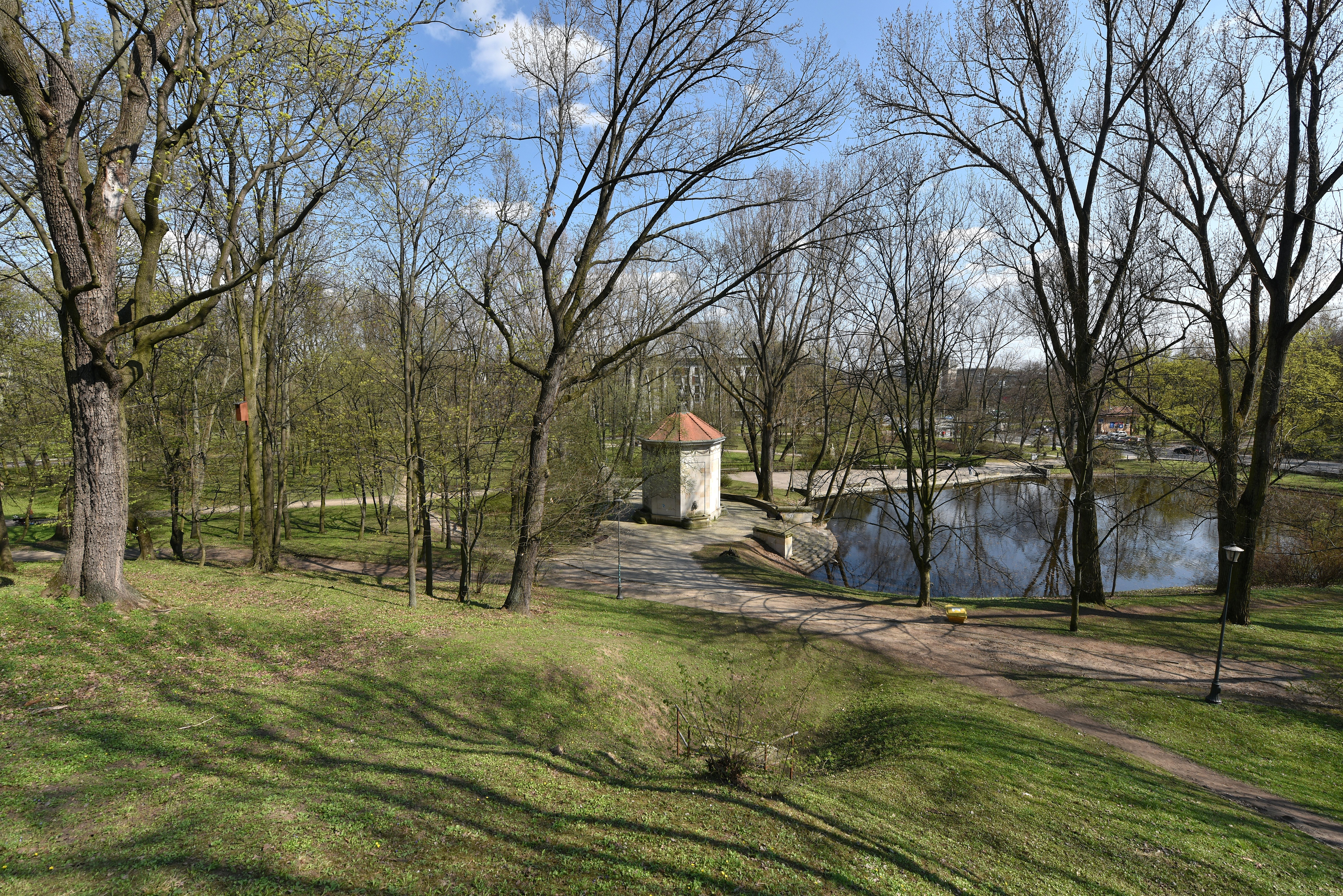
Princely Park (Na Książęcem), established in 1779

Another garden, situated north of today's Książęca Street (Princely Street), was established for Poniatowski between 1776 and 1779. The hilly garden contained many novelty and oriental structures, including a 15-metre minaret, a Chinese pavilion and a Middle Eastern outbuilding, which was dubbed by locals as the "Imam House" (Domek Imama). None of these remain standing today with the exception of "Elizeum", an underground brick-laid rotunda and a series of corridors and tunnels which once served as a maison de plaisance retreat for the wealthy. A neo-historic waterwell pavilion was erected after the Second World War, when the gardens were transformed into a public park.

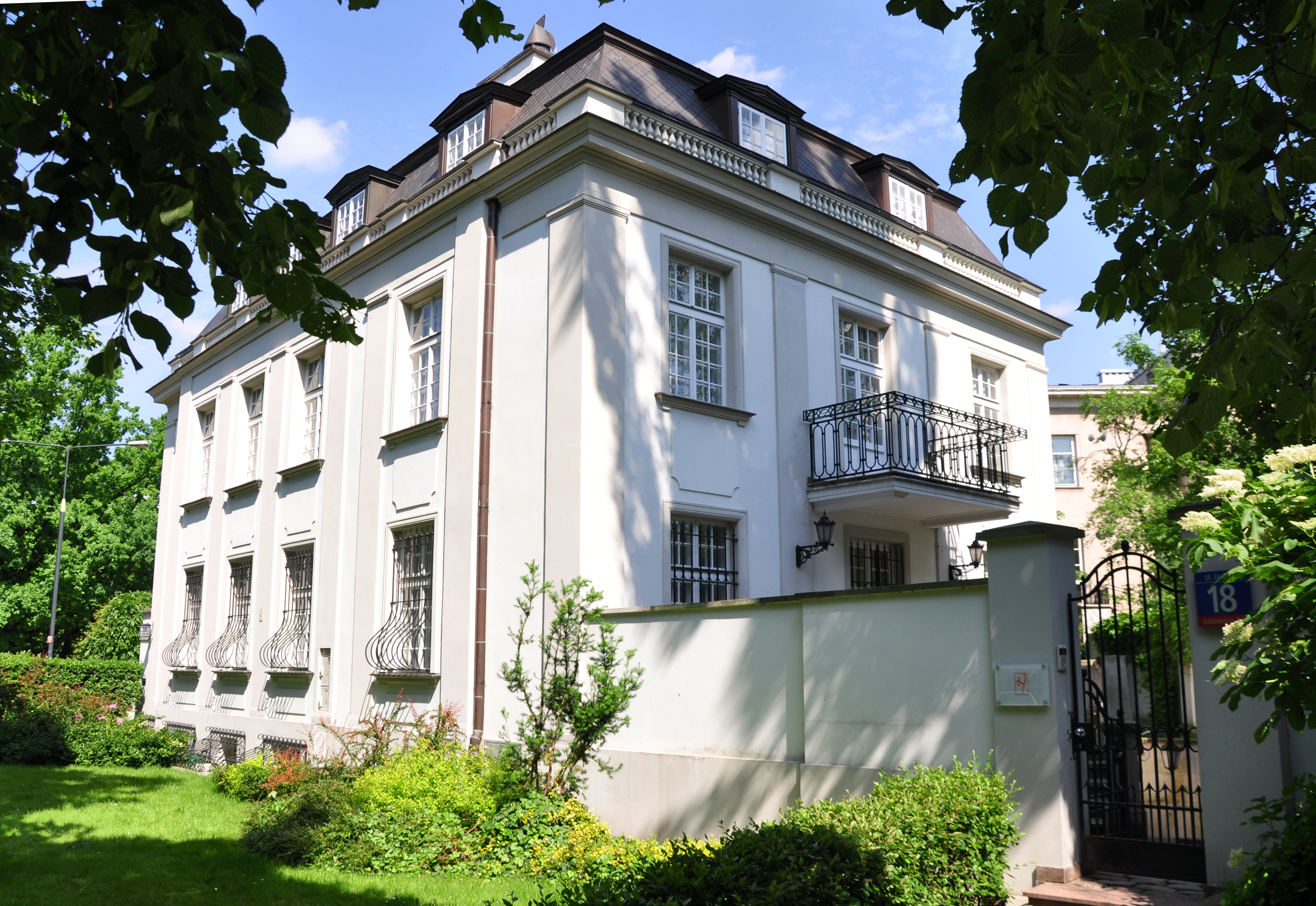
One of the historical villas at Frascati

The Frascati neighbourhood was inhabited by many notables and dignitaries, among them nobles, financiers, business tycoons, generals and statesmen like the much-detested Nikolay Novosiltsev, the council commissar in the Congress Kingdom of Poland. With the private gardens parceled in 1929, several modern villas were erected north of the Polish parliament, around today's Nullo, Frascati, Konopnicka and Senacka streets. These were once owned or occupied by Warsaw's wealthiest and most important residents. The majority of buildings and infrastructure survived the Second World War intact, particularity the ornate tenement houses at Wiejska Street. It remained an exclusive suburb under the Polish People's Republic, frequently visited by heads of state and communist officials. The large headquarters building of the Polish United Workers' Party (PZPR) was completed in 1952 on Frascati's northern edge.

At present, Qatar and Kuwait have their embassies and consulates in Frascati. A colony of embassies also exists to the south, just outside of the neighbourhood's borders and around the Ujazdów Park. Frascati is officially part of the South Downtown (Polish: Śródmieście Południowe) division, but remains an independent neighbourhood in its own right.

== Landmarks ==
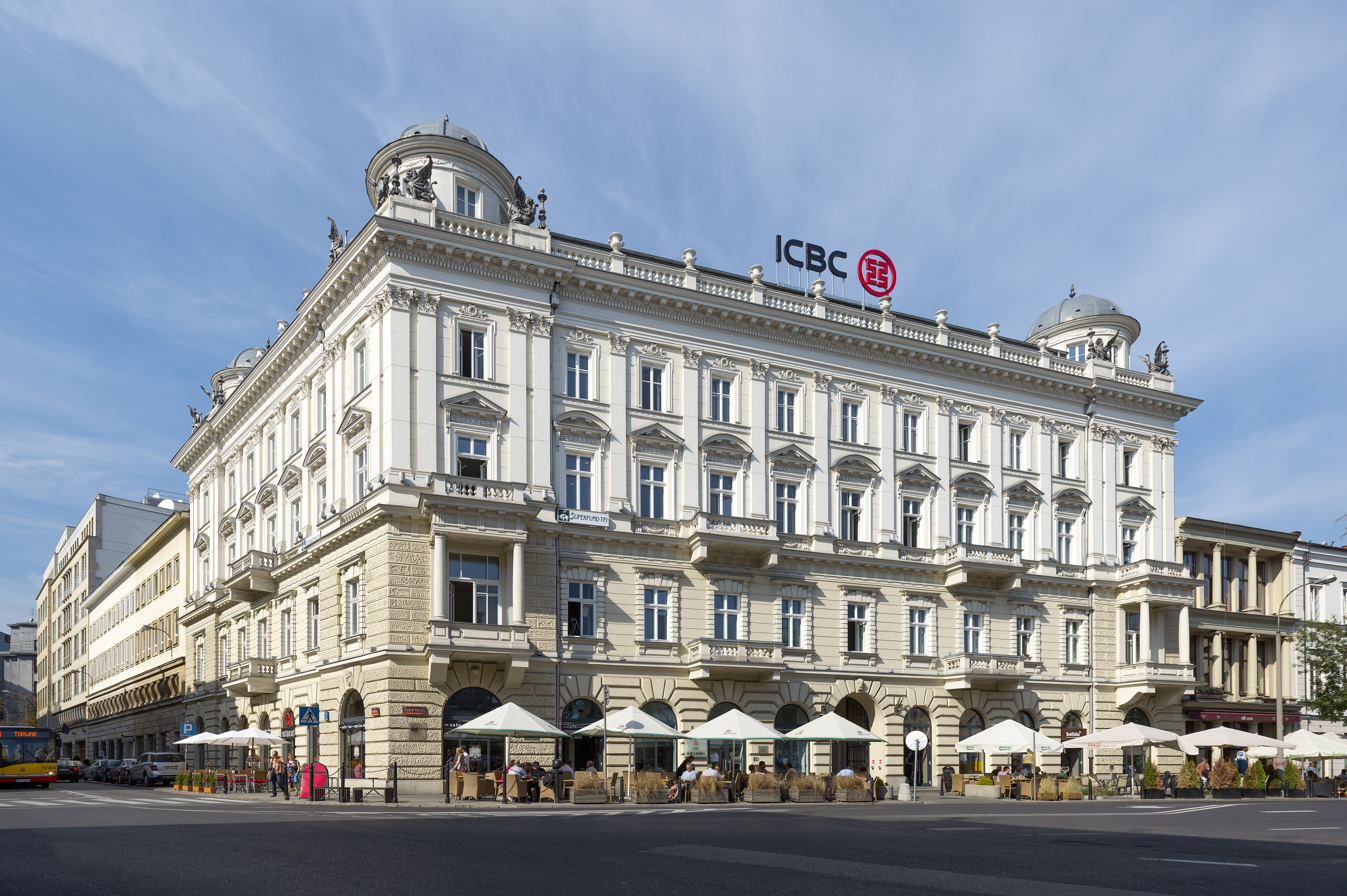
Three Crosses Square, the westernmost edge of Frascati

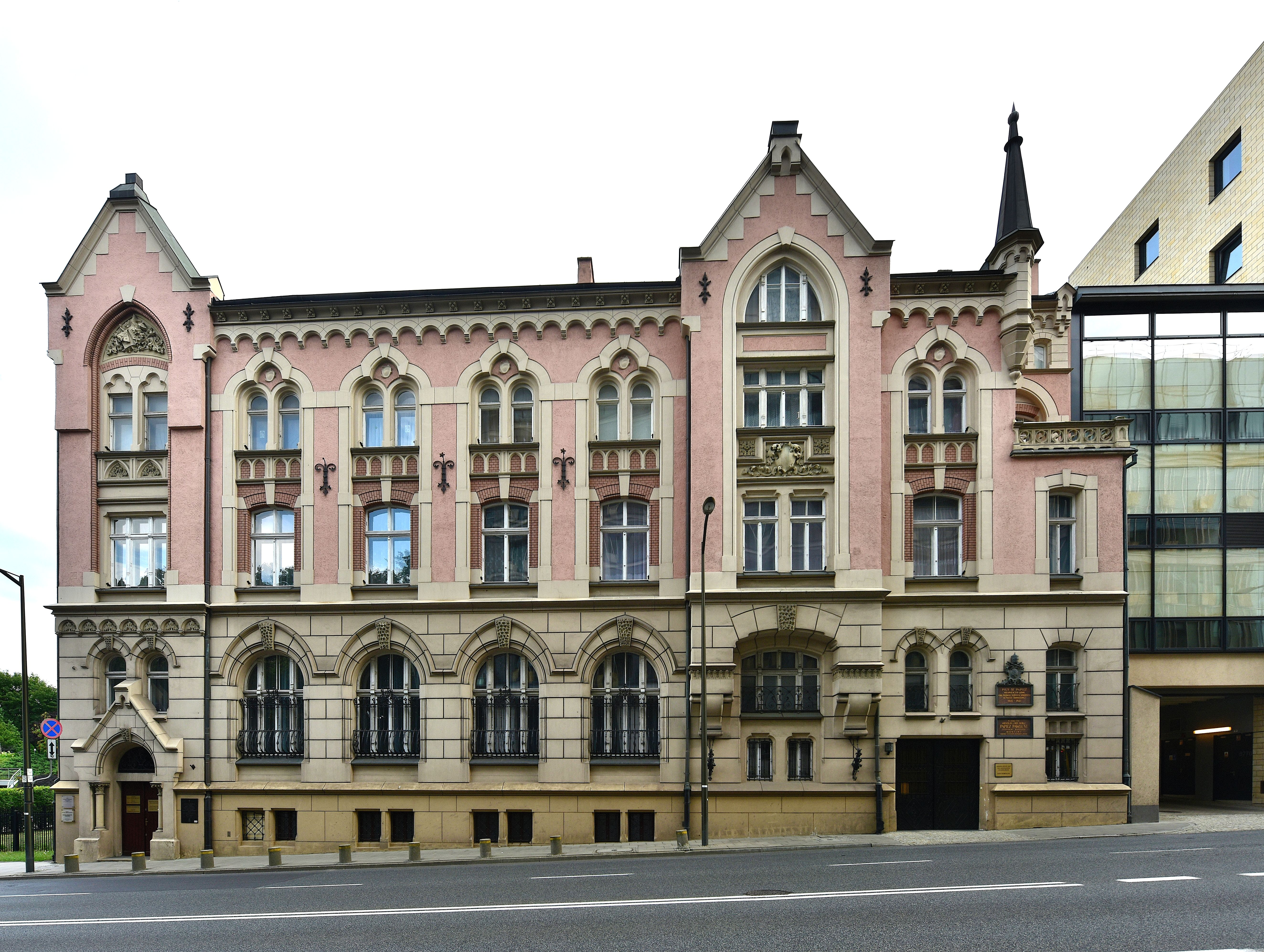
The Rectory House

- St. Alexander's Church, completed in 1825 and designed by Chrystian Piotr Aigner
- National Museum, completed in 1938, one of the largest museums in the country
- Sejm (Polish parliament), including the office of the President of Poland
- Warsaw Stock Exchange
- Museum of the Earth of the Polish Academy of Sciences
- Sheraton Grand Warsaw Hotel
- Marshal Rydz Park
- Warsaw Center for the Chinese Language
- Falkowski Institute for the Deaf and Hearing Impaired
- Tenements at Wiejska Street and at Three Crosses Square
- Rectory House of St. Alexander's Church at 21 Książęca Street

== See also ==
- History of Warsaw
- Śródmieście, Warsaw
- Muranów
