= Solec =

Neighbourhood in Warsaw, Poland

Coordinates: 52.2298°N 21.0381°E

- Warsaw neighborhood
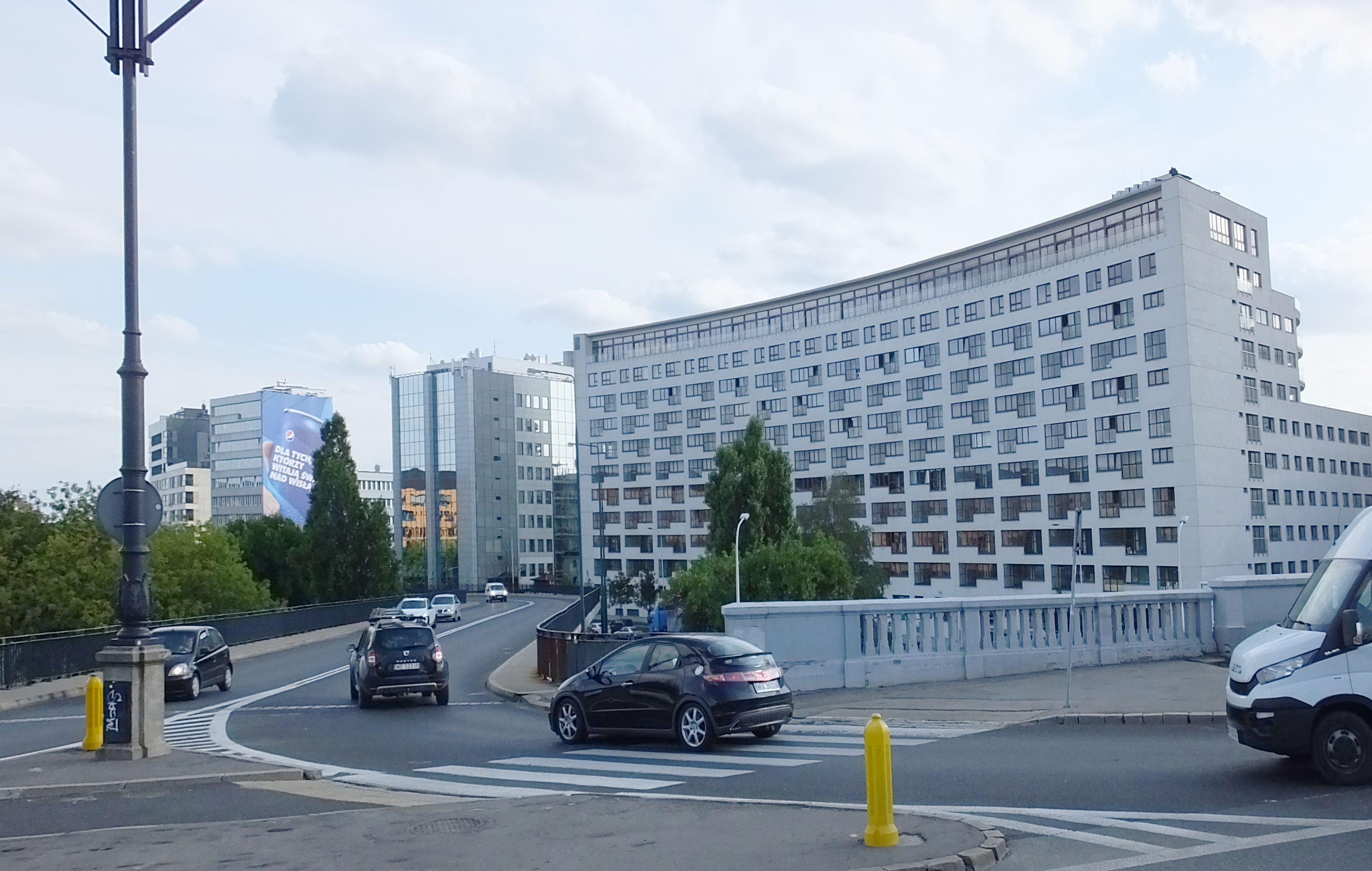
- Contemporary Solec

- Location of Solec neighbourhood (red) in the district of Śródmieście (navy blue)

Solec (Polish pronunciation: [ˈsɔlɛt͡s]) is a neighbourhood along the Vistula river in Warsaw, the capital of Poland. It is situated east of Frascati on the southeastern edge of Downtown and south of the Powiśle suburb. Solec was a self governing settlement and town from 1675 until its incorporation into Warsaw in 1791. The name "Solec" is derived from the Polish word for salt – sól – which was extensively traded and transported through the neighbourhood since the late Middle Ages. However, contemporary Solec is mostly occupied by residential tower blocks and commercial buildings.

== History ==
=== Middle Ages–1700s ===
The village of Solec was first documented in 1381 and in 1382 Janusz I the Old, Duke of Masovia, granted the settlement autonomy, which included trade privileges. Archaeological examinations and excavations have revealed the existence of a medieval port at which barges transporting salt would moor. These barges travelled across the Vistula carrying salt from distant regions such as Kraków and, notably, from the salt mining town of Wieliczka.

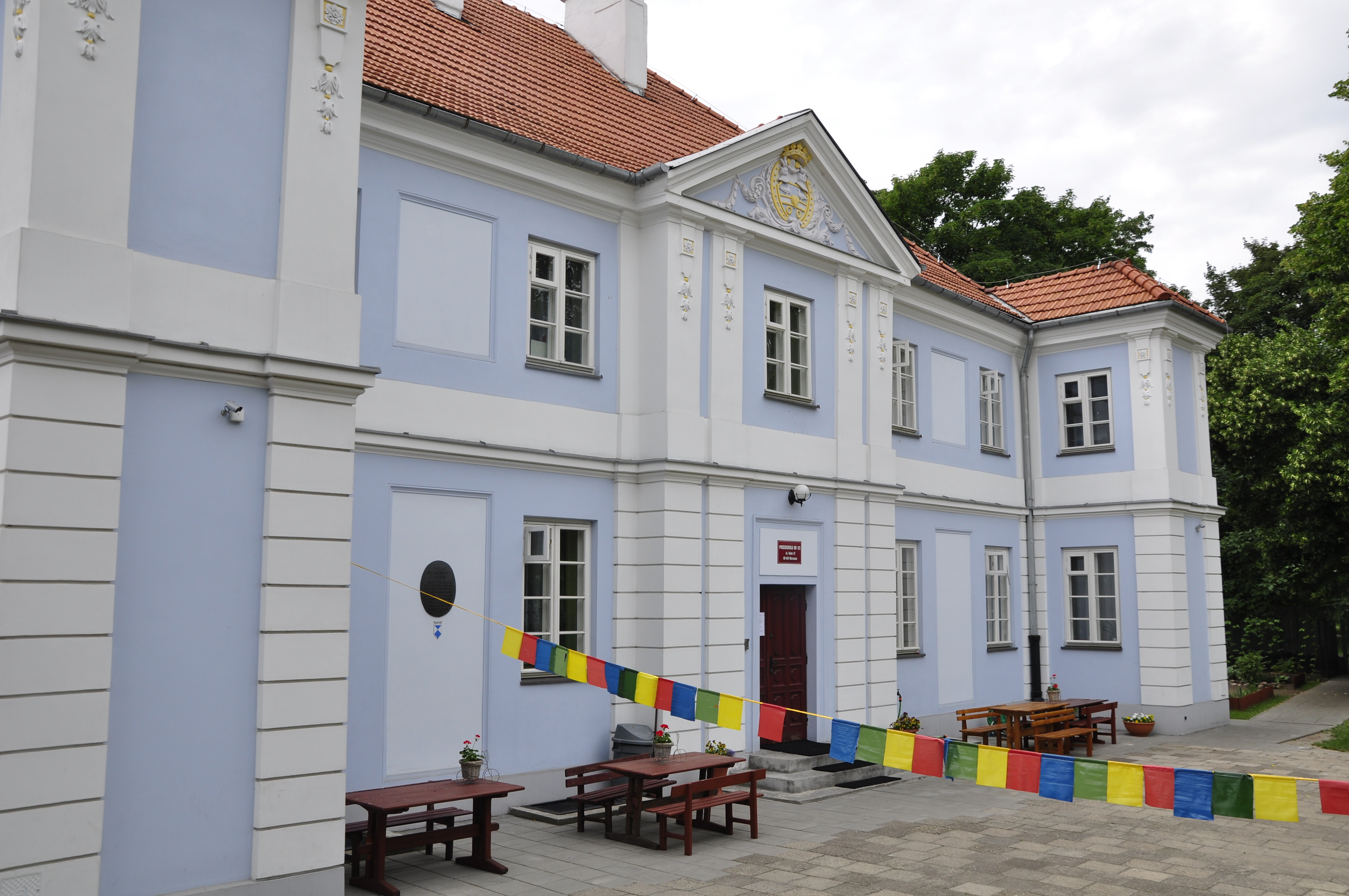
Symonowicz Palace from 1768

Solec was granted town privileges in 1675 and became part of the jurydyka system, a fully autonomous enclave within lands governed by Warsaw's council. Large salt storehouses were built along the river, including granaries, agricultural facilities and inns for the barge rafters. In 1698, the Trinitarian Order began the construction of a temple which is now the Church of the Holy Trinity. In 1708, an epidemic broke out in the district which killed all of the Trinitarian monks and in 1713, the town was flooded. By the beginning of the 18th century, Solec was already inhabited by 5,000 people. In 1762, a small palatial residence was erected for a wealthy merchant; it was later acquired by an Armenian noble called Simon de Symonowicz. Despite war damage, the Symonowicz Palace still stands today.

In 1770, Stanisław Lubomirski ordered the construction of an entrenchment (Lubomirski Ramparts) which defined the southern border of contemporary Solec. The western part bordering Frascati was then redeveloped into a palatial parkland for Kazimierz Poniatowski, brother of king Stanisław II Augustus and lord chamberlain of the Polish–Lithuanian Commonwealth. The Princely Park (Na Książęcem), situated between Frascati and Solec on Książęca Street, was once a venue for oriental structures and pavilions. A 15-metre decorative minaret from the late 18th century stood on the park's grounds until its destruction by the Nazis in 1944, during the Warsaw Uprising.

=== 1800–1939 ===
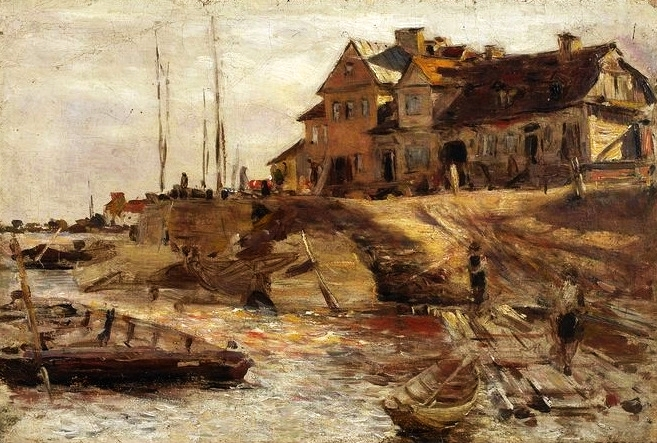
Solec embankment by Aleksander Gierymski, 1883

The early 19th century brought considerable industrialisation to Warsaw and its region; small manufacturing facilities, factories, breweries and cotton mills were built in Solec, which further attracted settlement from nearby villages and other countries. On 29 November 1830, the November uprising against the Russians began after a Polish squadron destroyed the Weiss Brewery in the vicinity of the Russian army barracks.

Among the industries established on the riverbank were the steam navigation workshops, bought in 1871 by the shipowner Maurycy Fajans. He developed them into a shipyard building passenger steamers for the Vistula. The yard built Pan Tadeusz, which entered service in 1911 and was the largest vessel on the river before the First World War.

With industrialisation came gentrification and poverty; Solec became inhabited mostly by middle- or lower-class factory workers and tradesmen. This was in contrast to the adjacent Frascati suburb, which was inhabited by the upper classes; nobles, business tycoons and statesmen. In December 1918, a tram line began operation on the neighbourhood's main streets. Despite modernisation attempts, the embankment between the Poniatowski Bridge and Marshal Rydz Park (contemporary Wioślarska Street) was occupied by a slum comparable to London's Docklands. This extended to Powiśle. In the interwar period (1918–1939), the areas of Rozbrat and Górnośląska streets were urbanised; a colony of luxurious villas and manors built for Warsaw's intelligentsia, which still exists today.

=== 1939–contemporary ===
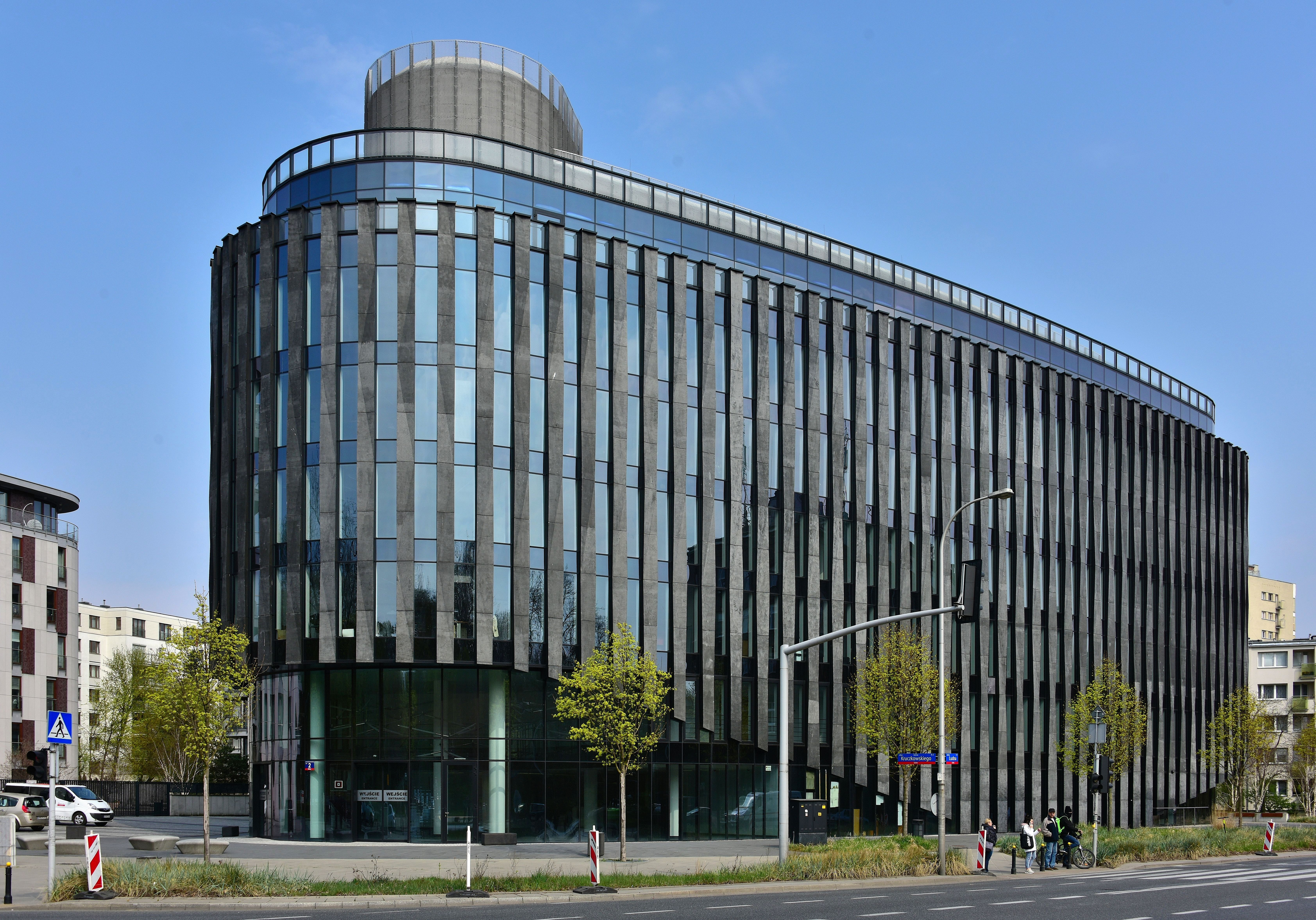
Powiśle Park commercial building

The Warsaw Uprising in 1944 brought severe destruction to most of the suburb's already low quality shanty buildings, particularly in the south. Some of the most brutal fighting took place in Solec; the Germans hanged or executed most of the captured partisans, including women, in a paint factory.

In post-war years, the authorities of the Polish People's Republic attempted to remove the previous slum and industrial character of the neighbourhood. The factories with most workhouses were not reconstructed and were instead replaced by socialist tower blocks and apartment buildings in the 1960s and 1970s. The tram line ceased operation in 1960.

Since 1989, the suburb has undergone a major transformation with the construction of new housing estates, hotels, commercial facilities and gradual modernisation.

== See also ==
- Muranów
- Frascati
- Żoliborz
- Vistula
