= Zbigniew Ścibor-Rylski =

Polish general

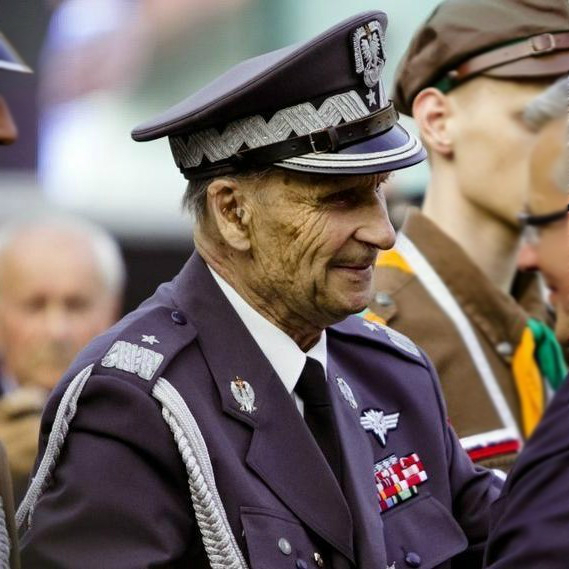
- Ścibor-Rylski during a ceremony on marking the 70th anniversary of the Warsaw Uprising (31 July 2014)
- Born: 10 March 1917; Brovki-Pershi, Russian Empire
- Died: 3 August 2018 (aged 101); Warsaw, Poland
- Military career
- Allegiance: Poland, Armia Krajowa
- Branch: Aviation, infantry
- Service years: 1936–1945
- Rank: Brigadier general
- Nicknames: Motyl, Stanislaw
- Unit: 27 Volhynian Infantry Division
- Conflicts: World War II (Battle of Kock, Warsaw Uprising)
- Awards: Virtuti Militari, Order of Polonia Restituta, Cross of Valor, Partisan Cross, Warsaw Cross of the Uprising

Zbigniew Dionizy Ścibor-Rylski (10 March 1917 – 3 August 2018) was a Polish brigadier general and aviator who was a participant of the Warsaw Uprising during World War II. As a Polish Air Force officer, he fought alongside the resistance movement starting in 1940 and rose through the ranks of Armia Krajowa.

Ścibor-Rylski retired with the rank of brigadier general in the Polish Land Forces, he was rewarded several Polish awards and decorations, including Virtuti Militari. He was Chairman of the Association of Warsaw Insurgents.

== Biography ==
=== Childhood and youth ===
Ostoja

Zbigniew Ścibor-Rylski was born at the height of World War I, in Brovki-Pershi (Polish: Browki), a village southeast of Zhytomyr, and southwest of Kyiv, in present-day Ukraine, but at the time part of the Russian Empire. He belonged to a Polish aristocratic (szlachta) family from the Clan of Ostoja, being the son of Oscar Ścibor-Rylski and Maria Raciborowska. Located in territory controlled at the time between Russia's republican government, Brovki is the central key estate, which included the Spiczyńce (from his Marszycka grandmother) and Wolica Zarubieniecka (from his Raciborowski grandparents).

In 1918, a year after the outbreak of the October Revolution in Russia, he fled with his family to Bila Tserkva (Biała Cerkiew), in Volhynia and then to Kyiv due to the Bolsheviks' great hunt for the rich land owners in their occupied areas. After the battle of Kiev by Polish troops under Edward Smigly-Rydz in 1920, the Ścibor-Rylskis left for Kyiv, then the newly independent Polish Republic by train. They settled in the Lublin region, initially in Studzianki, then in Zwierzyniec (near Zamość), where his father Oscar was offered a post within the county Maurycy Klemens Zamoyski in the Zamość Ordinance.

It was in Zwierzyniec that Ścibor-Rylski spend his remaining childhood years, until 1935. He attended the all-male Jan Zamoyski High School in Zamość, and then, after his fourth year, the Sułkowski family Gymnasium near Leszno, graduating in 1936. Shortly after this, he passed the Aviation Cadet School in the technical group in Warsaw, preceded by a glider aircraft course in Ustianowa. Originally training on "Wrony" and "Salamandry" in Ustianowa, he was, from 1939, testing aircraft in a wind tunnel at the Warsaw Polytechnic, working with bombers (PZL.37 Łoś, PZL.23 Karaś) and PZL P.7 fighters for the Polish Air Force Academy. In 1939, he graduated from the School of Aviation Cadets as Cadet Sergeant Engineer, specializing in aircraft engines and equipment. Given the first option for further air service, he selected the 1st Aviation Regiment, based at Warsaw's Okecie Airport. His graduation and promotion to second lieutenant were prevented by the outbreak of World War II.

=== World War II ===
During the Invasion of Poland by Nazi German troops (September 1939), Ścibor-Rylski served in the 1st Aviation Regiment: on September 6, he left Warsaw in the squadron of Major Władysław Prohazko. Initially on trucks, and then on foot, the group broke through German lines and retreated to the east. They took part in other clashes, rallying with the Independent Operational Group Polesie, under the command of Brigadier General Franciszek Kleeberg. After the capitulation of Kock, he attempted to break through to Romania, but he was captured in the village called Krzywda. After an escape from the prisoner-of-war camp, Ścibor-Rylski returned to Warsaw and joined the underground resistance movement, where he was introduced by his former commander Prohazko. He was sworn into the movement in September 1940, receiving the nom de guerre Stanislaw. From 1940 to June 1943, he worked in pharmaceutical company, Przemyslowo-Handlowe Zaklady Chemiczne Ludwik Spiess i Syn Spólka Akcyjna (the present-day Polfa factories). In parallel, from 1941, he was a partisan fighter behind the Eastern Front, in Kovel.

Beginning January 1944, Ścibor-Rylski was engaged in fighting alongside Armia Krajowa's 27 Volhynian Infantry Division, throughout its advance route. From July of that year, he was in Warsaw, taking part in the Warsaw Uprising in the ranks of Czata 49 Battalion, based at the "Radosław" training camp. He was a company commander in the Sokół 50 Infantry Battalion.

At the end of the war Major Ścibor-Rylski, by then also known under the code name Motyl ("Butterfly"), was in Łowicz. Following the German capitulation of April, he reported to Lieutenant Colonel Jan Mazurkiewicz that he had decided to terminate his activity with the resistance movement and return to civilian life in Poznań.

=== Post-war period ===
After the war and during the early years of the Polish communist regime, Ścibor-Rylski was head of the Bureau of Automobile Repairs Motozbyt in Poznań and then, from 1956, was employed by a worker cooperative (Zjednoczonych Zespołach Gospodarczych INCO). In August 1984, he joined the Civic Committee of the Commemoration of the 40th anniversary of the Warsaw Uprising.

As member of the Association of the 27 Volhynian Infantry Division and the Kleeberg Association of Independent Operational Group Polesie, he also belonged to the initiative group of the creation of the Warsaw Uprising Museum. Ścibor-Rylski was also in the Honour Committee for the Museum's Construction. He was one of those who signed the protest against the building of the Warsaw monument to the victims of massacres in Volhynia in the form proposed by Marian Konieczny. From December 1, 2004, he is a member of the Virtuti Militari Order's Chapter.

=== Collaboration with communists ===
According to documents gathered by the National Remembrance Institute, Ścibor-Rylski was registered as an informant of the communist secret police Służba Bezpieczeństwa. He does not deny that he was an informant. As he stated, he worked mainly to pull information from SB and he is convinced that he had managed to warn several of his partisans friends from being arrested by SB. He explains that he was advised by his insurgent commander, "Radosław", to become an informant for this.

=== Private life ===
Zbigniew Ścibor-Rylski had three sisters: Kalina, Ewa, Danuta. He was married to Zofia Kochanska (also known as Marie Springer ace of Polish underground intelligence. Located the battleship Tirpitz (Operation Catechism), escaped from the Gestapo while 8 months pregnant).

== Ranks ==
- Lieutenant – September 4, 1939
- First lieutenant – 1943
- Captain – August 28, 1944
- Major – October 2, 1944
- Colonel in reserve – after the war
- Brigadier general in reserve – May 7, 2005

== Awards and distinctions ==
- Virtuti Militari, Silver Cross (twice)
- Polonia Restituta, Grand Cross
- Polonia Restituta, Commander's Cross with Star
- Cross of Valour (Poland), twice
- Partisan Cross
- Warsaw Uprising Cross
- Pro Patria Medal
- Augustus Ferdinand Wollf Medal – the highest award of Warsaw Medical Association, presented to Ścibor-Rylski by Association President Jerzy Jurkiewicz
- Honorary Citizen of the City of Warsaw

== See also ==
- Clan of Ostoja
- Ostoja coat of arms
- Zbigniew Ścibor-Rylski Monument
