= General Zbigniew Ścibor-Rylski Memorial =

Monument in Warsaw, Poland

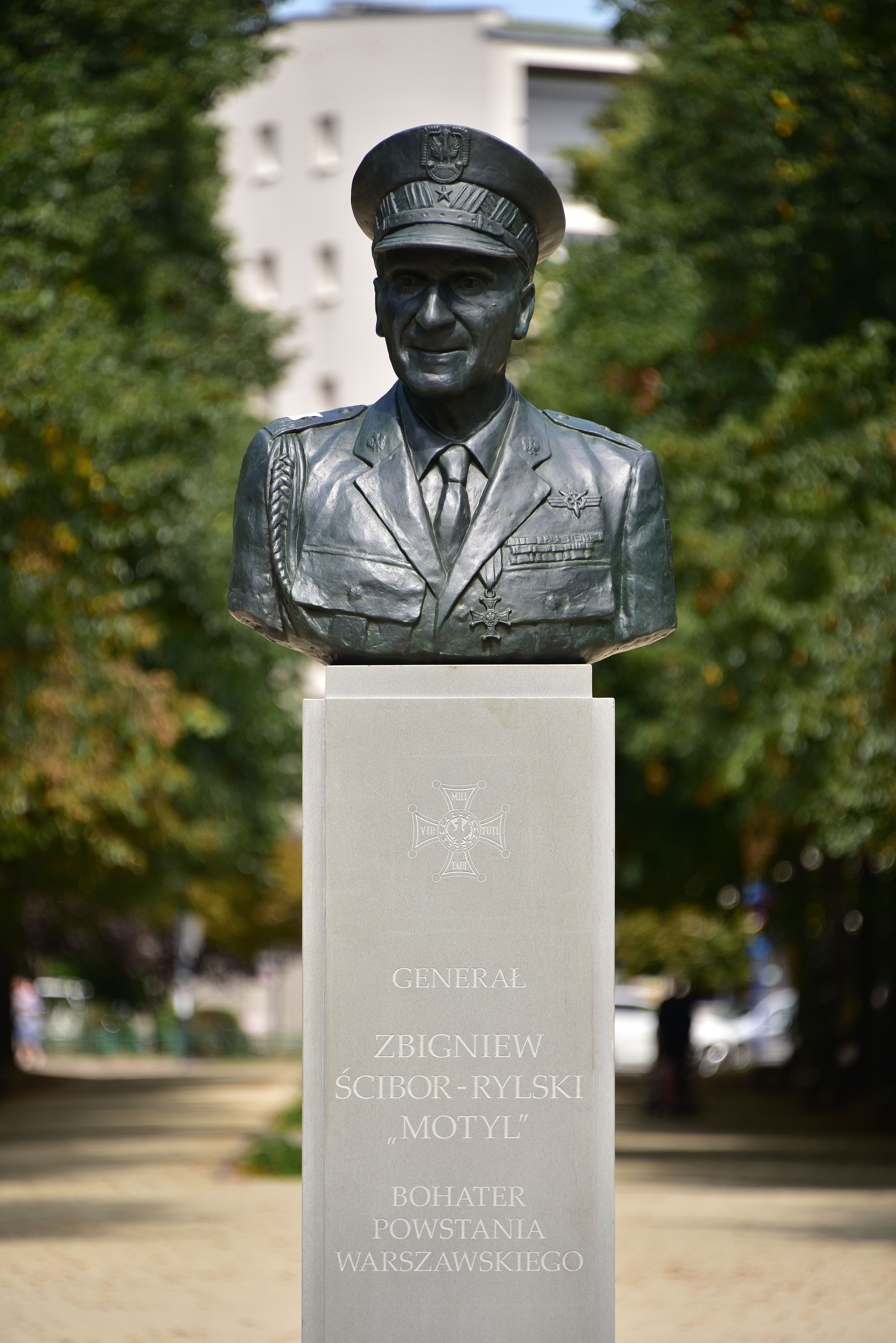
- The Zbigniew Ścibor-Rylski Monument in 2019.
- Interactive map of General Zbigniew Ścibor-Rylski Memorial
- Location: Marshal Edward Rydz-Śmigły Park, Warsaw, Poland
- Coordinates: 52°13′45.03″N 21°02′22.52″E
- Designer: Marcin Nowicki
- Type: Bust
- Opening date: 2 August 2019
- Dedicated to: Zbigniew Ścibor-Rylski

The General Zbigniew Ścibor-Rylski Memorial (Note: Polish: Pomnik gen. Zbigniewa Ścibora-Rylskiego) is a monument in the Marshal Edward Rydz-Śmigły Park in Warsaw, Poland. It is dedicated to Zbigniew Ścibor-Rylski, officer of the Polish Armed Forces, who fought in the Warsaw Uprising during the World War II. It was designed by Marcin Nowicki and unveiled on 2 August 2019.

== History ==
The monument was proposed and founded by the Warsaw Insurgents Association and the Heroes of the Warsaw Uprising Remembrance Foundation. It was made by sculptor Marcin Nowicki and unveiled on 2 August 2019, a day before the first anniversary of Ścibor-Rylski's death.

== Characteristics ==
The monument is dedicated to general Zbigniew Ścibor-Rylski (1917–2018), an officer of the Polish Armed Forces, who fought in the Warsaw Uprising during the World War II. It is placed in the Marshal Edward Rydz-Śmigły Park. The location was chosen because the Battalion Czata 49, in which Ścibor-Rylski was a company commander, fought there in 1944.

The monument consists of a bust of Ścibor-Rylski in a military uniform, placed on a pedestal. It bears an illustration of the cross of the Virtuti Militari order, and an inscription as transcribed below.

Polish inscription

Generał
Zbigniew Ścibor-Rylski
„Motyl”
Bohater Powstania Warszawskiego

English translation

General
Zbigniew Ścibor-Rylski
"Motyl"
Hero of the Warsaw Uprising
