= Three Crosses Square =

Square in Warsaw

Three Crosses Square Plac Trzech Krzyży
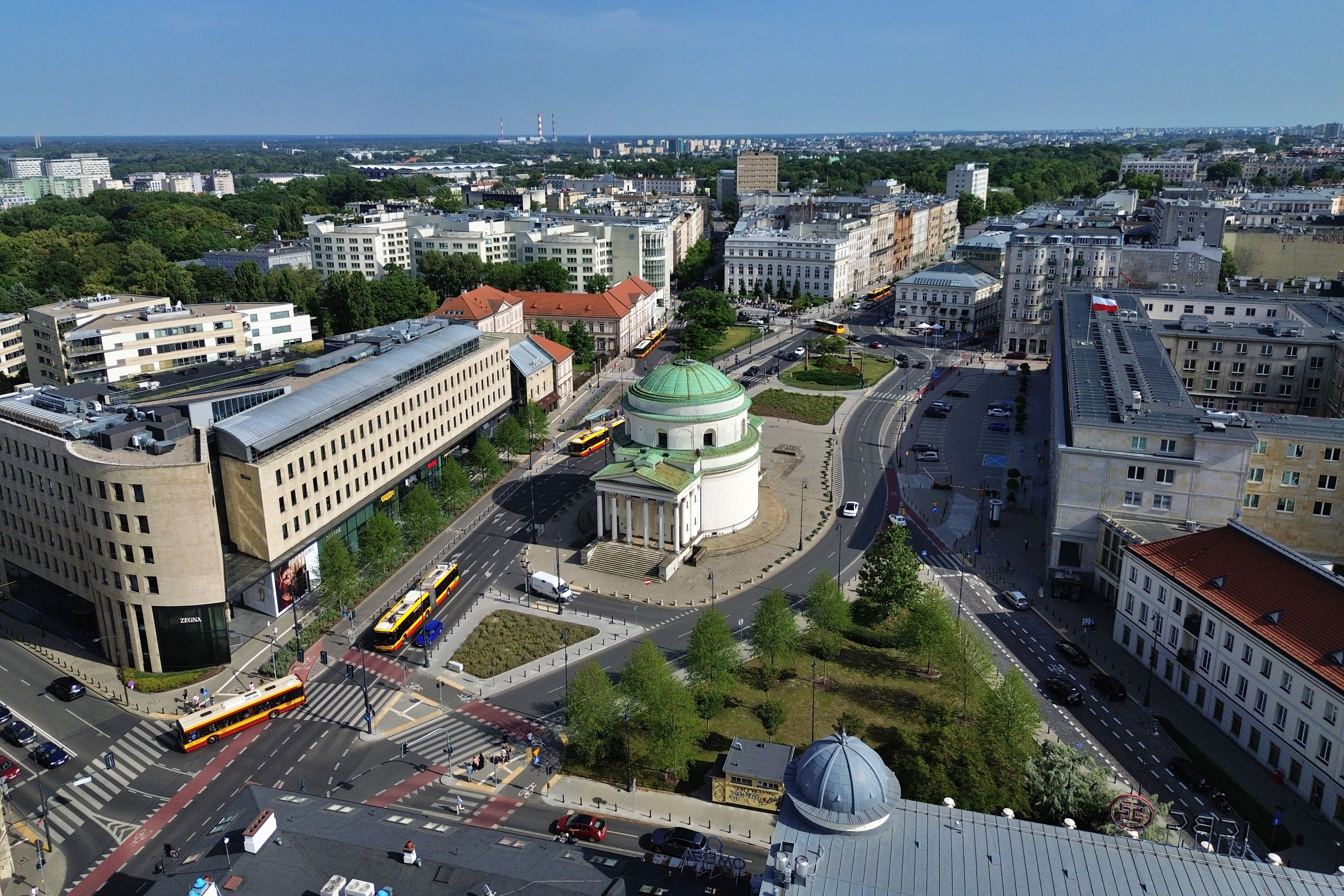
- Three Crosses Square with St. Alexander's Church, 2024

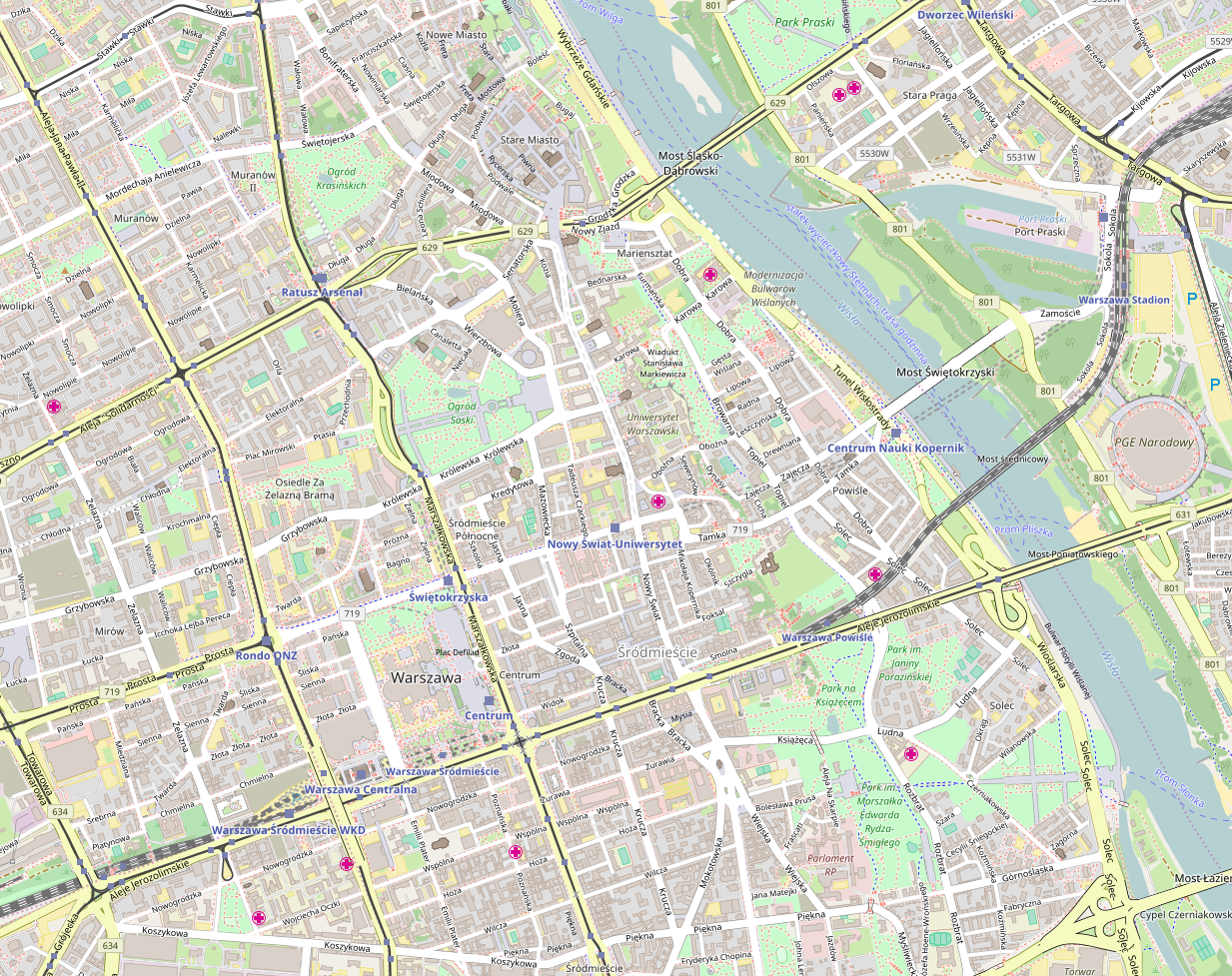
- Location within Warsaw
- Location: Warsaw, Poland
- Quarter: Śródmieście, Frascati
- Coordinates: 52°13′48″N 21°1′31″E
- North: Nowy Świat Street
- South: Ujazdów Avenue, Mokotowska Street

Construction
- Inauguration: 18th century

Three Crosses Square (Polish: Plac Trzech Krzyży [ˈplat͡s tʂɛx ˈkʂɨʐɨ]), also known as Triple Cross Square, is an urban square and a road junction in the central district of Warsaw, Poland. It lies on the Royal Route and links Nowy Świat (New World) Street, to the north, with Ujazdów Avenue to the south.

Much of the square's area is devoted to a major thoroughfare.

== Name ==
The name originated in the 18th century, when two Baroque stone crosses were positioned near the site of what would later become the Church of St. Alexander, with a third cross placed in the hands of Saint John of Nepomuk; the statue depicting Saint John stands to this day. These crosses marked the square as a significant spiritual waypoint, situated at the intersection of major routes leading into the city and along the Stations of the Cross. Over time, the name became a lasting fixture in Warsaw’s urban identity, reflecting both its ecclesiastical roots and its role as a central point of orientation in the expanding capital.

== History ==
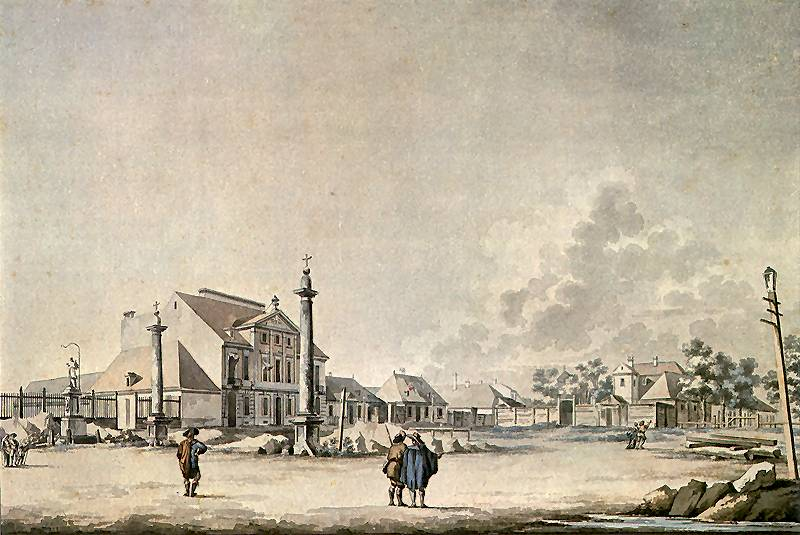
Three Crosses Square, in 1785 watercolor by Zygmunt Vogel

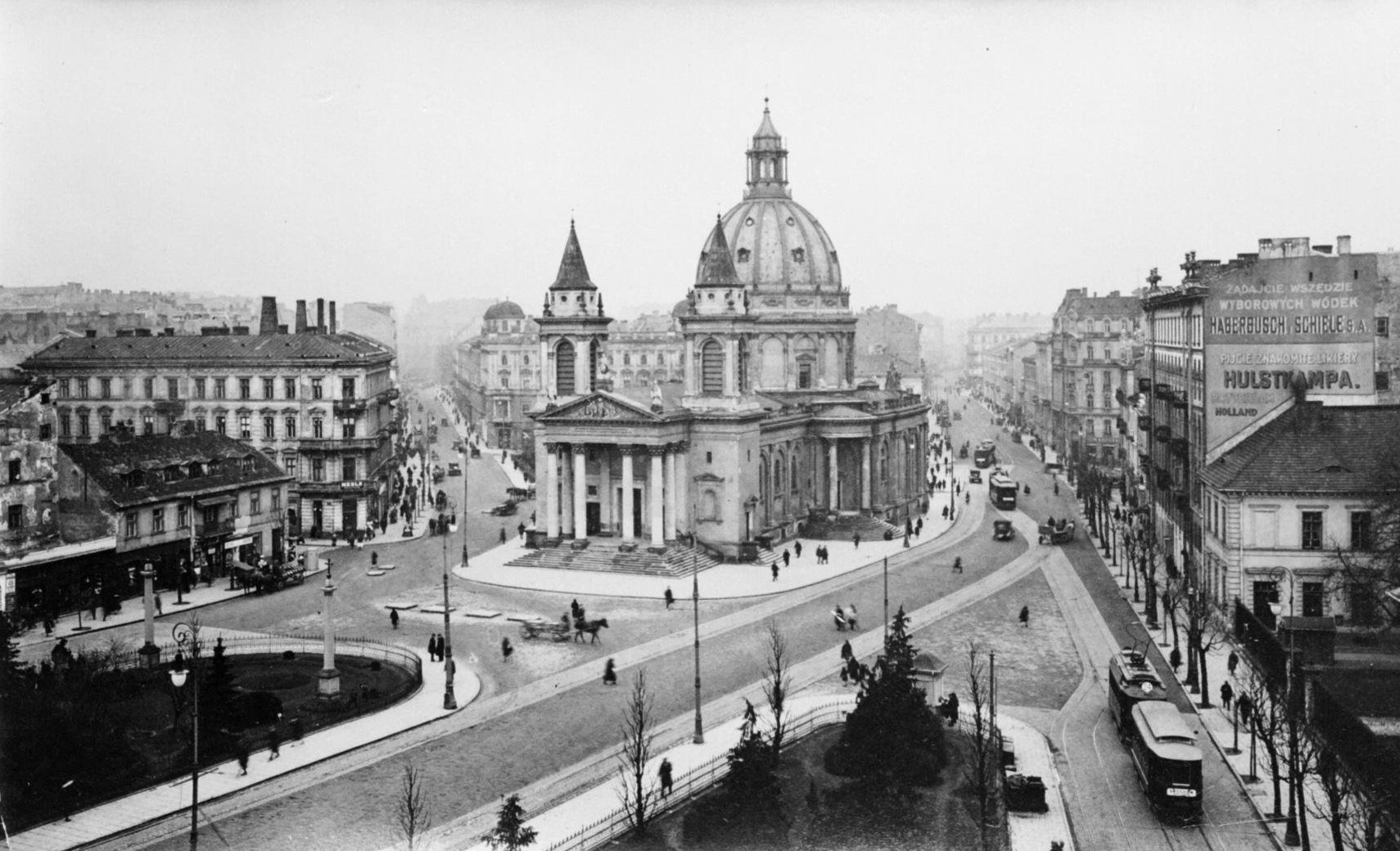
The Square and St. Alexander's Church in 1934

=== Early history ===
Until the 18th century, the area now occupied by the square was little more than sparsely populated open terrain south of the then-city limits of Warsaw which hosted a market. During the reign of King Augustus II the Strong, between 1724 and 1731, a "road to Calvary" (Stations of the Cross) was created, with the first station being located near the present square, and the last station next to Ujazdów Castle to the south. The first station featured two golden crosses. In 1752, Grand Marshal of the Crown Franciszek Bieliński erected nearby a statue of St. John of Nepomuk, also holding a cross. On account of the three crosses, the populace took to calling the area "Rozdroże złotych krzyży"—"the Crossroads of the Golden Crosses".

Contrary to common belief, there are more than three crosses in the square nowadays; two are situated atop the northern and southern façades of the church and one is in front of the Institute for the Deaf, which was erected in 1827 and initially run by the Catholic Church. It is the oldest school and educational centre in Poland for hearing-impaired children and young people – deaf and hard of hearing.

The square’s formal creation is closely tied to the urban reforms of the early 1800s, when Warsaw underwent modernisation following the partitions of Poland. Three Crosses Square became an important part of Warsaw’s Trakt Królewski (Royal Route), a ceremonial thoroughfare stretching from the Royal Castle to Wilanów Palace. The square began to attract noble residences, government buildings, and commercial establishments. The key moment in its development was the construction of the Church of St. Alexander between 1818 and 1825. It was designed by Chrystian Piotr Aigner, one of Poland's leading neoclassical architects. The church was modelled on the Pantheon in Rome, reflecting contemporary neoclassical tastes and the desire to express civic grandeur. In the second half of the 19th century, the square was integrated further into the urban fabric with the construction of tenement houses and the introduction of tramlines. The church was remodelled into a richly decorated Renaissance Revival style in the years 1886–1895 by Józef Pius Dziekoński.

=== During the Second World War ===
The square suffered significant damage during the German invasion of Poland in September 1939. During the subsequent occupation, the area was part of the "German District," given its proximity to the Gestapo headquarters on Aleja Szucha.

During the occupation, the square became the focal point for a notable survival story involving a group of Jewish children known as the "Cigarette Sellers of Three Crosses Square". Having escaped from the Warsaw Ghetto, approximately twenty children - some as young as six years old - survived on the "Aryan side" by selling cigarettes, matches, and newspapers to German soldiers and Polish civilians in the square.

The children lived in constant danger from szmalcowniks (blackmailers) and the nearby Gestapo headquarters. They often spent their nights sleeping in the ruins of bombed buildings, in the square's underground passages, or in nearby cemeteries. Despite their circumstances, they maintained an organized community and were eventually aided by the Jewish underground, specifically by Joseph Ziemian, who provided them with forged identity documents. Several members of the group survived the Warsaw Uprising of 1944 and later emigrated to Israel.

A commemorative plaque dedicated to the "Cigarette Sellers" is located on the wall of the Ministry of Economy building (Plac Trzech Krzyży 3/5), honoring their courage and survival during the occupation.

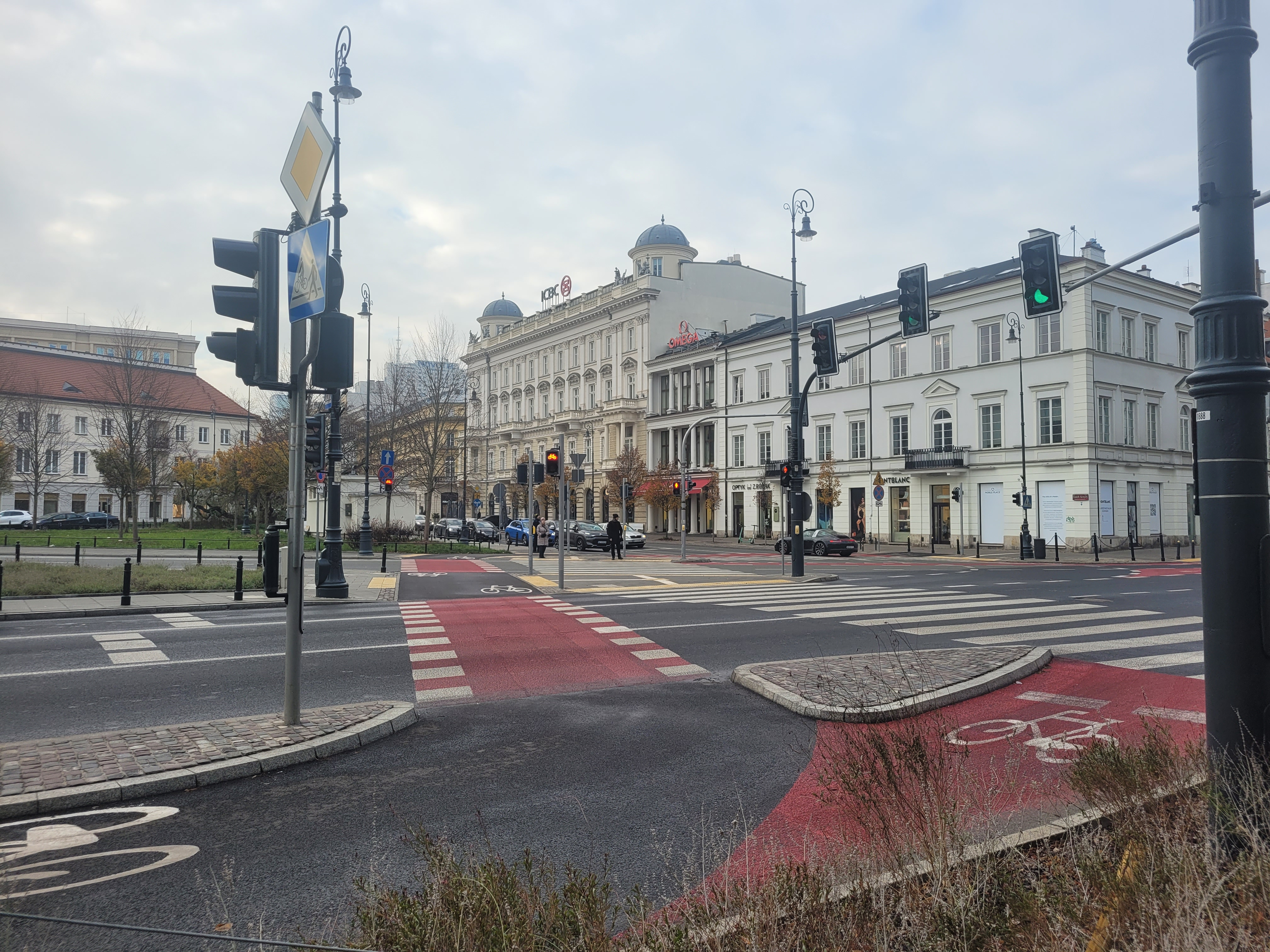
Square's north end retains much of its historical appearance.

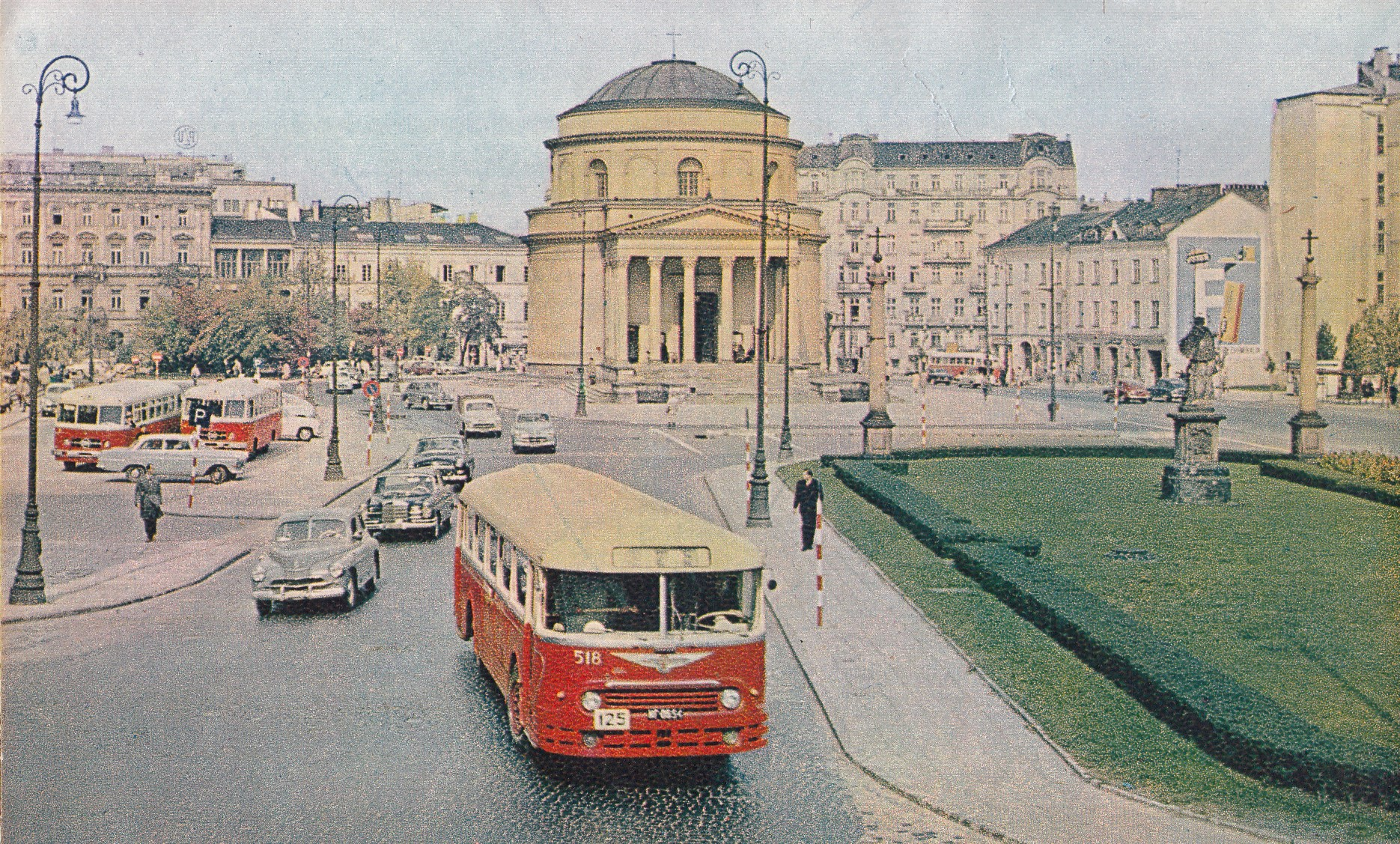
Square in the 1960s

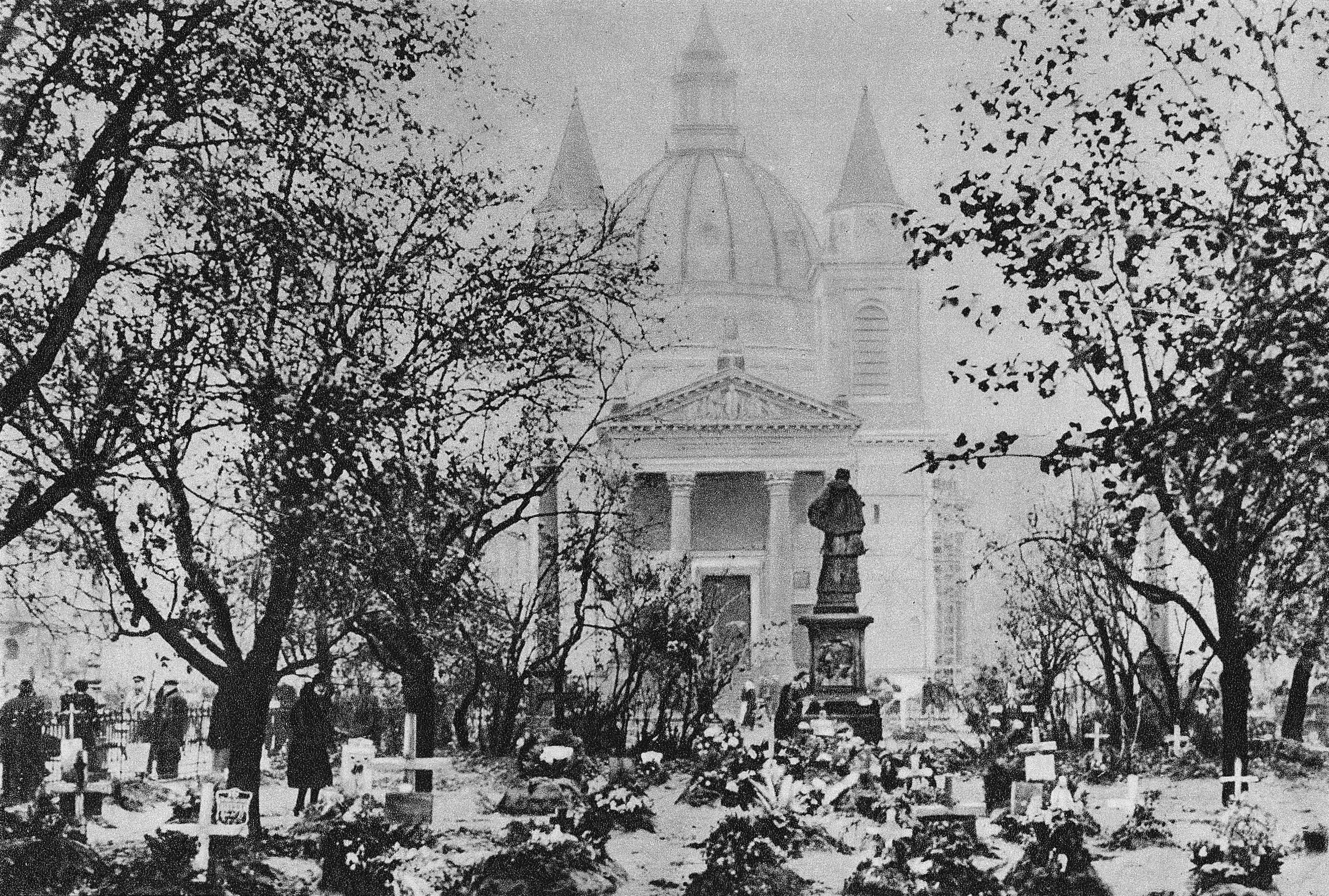
Graves of fallen during 1939 defense of Warsaw, before St. Alexander's Church

During the 1944 Warsaw Uprising, the square and most of the surrounding buildings were destroyed or deliberately demolished by the German forces.

=== After the Second World War ===
The rebuilding of Warsaw after World War II was a considerable effort, and Three Crosses Square became part of this national recovery. However, the reconstruction followed the ideological lines of a new communist regime which headed the Polish People's Republic until 1989. Many prewar structures were not restored to their original forms, and socialist realism guided much of the architectural renewal. The Church of St. Alexander was partially reconstructed between 1949 and 1952, but its restored form resembled the simpler 19th-century design (without towers) rather than the more elaborate Renaissance Revival version. Nonetheless, much of the northern side of the square retains its original appearance.

=== The Contemporary Square ===
Today, Three Crosses Square is one of Warsaw's most prestigious addresses. It serves as a hub for luxury retail, housing boutiques for international high-fashion brands such as Hugo Boss, Burberry, and Ermenegildo Zegna. The square remains a major transit node on the Royal Route and is bordered by influential institutions, including the Ministry of Economy and the Warsaw Stock Exchange.

The square now hosts exclusive retail stores — Hugo Boss, Burberry, Church's, Ermenegildo Zegna, Max Mara, Coccinelle, W. Kruk, JM Weston, Franscesco Biasa, Escada, MAX & Co., Lacoste, Emporio Armani, and Kenzo. Adjacent to the square is the Warsaw Stock Exchange, an HSBC Premiere office, and a Sheraton Hotel.

== See also ==
- South Downtown, Warsaw
- Bolesław Prus

== Sources ==
- (in Polish) T. Jaroszewski, Chrystian Piotr Aigner, architekt warszawskiego klasycyzmu (Chrystian Piotr Aigner: Architect of Warsaw Classicism), Warsaw, 1970.
- "Aigner, Chrystian Piotr". Encyklopedia Powszechna PWN (in Polish). Vol. 1. Warsaw: Państwowe Wydawnictwo Naukowe. 1973. p. 32.
- "Aigner, Chrystian Piotr". Encyklopedia Polski (in Polish). Kraków: Wydawnictwo Ryszard Kluszczyński. 1996. p. 12. ISBN 83-86328-60-6.
