= Museum of the Earth of the Polish Academy of Sciences =

Museum in Warsaw, Poland

Coordinates: 52°13′45″N 21°1′43″E

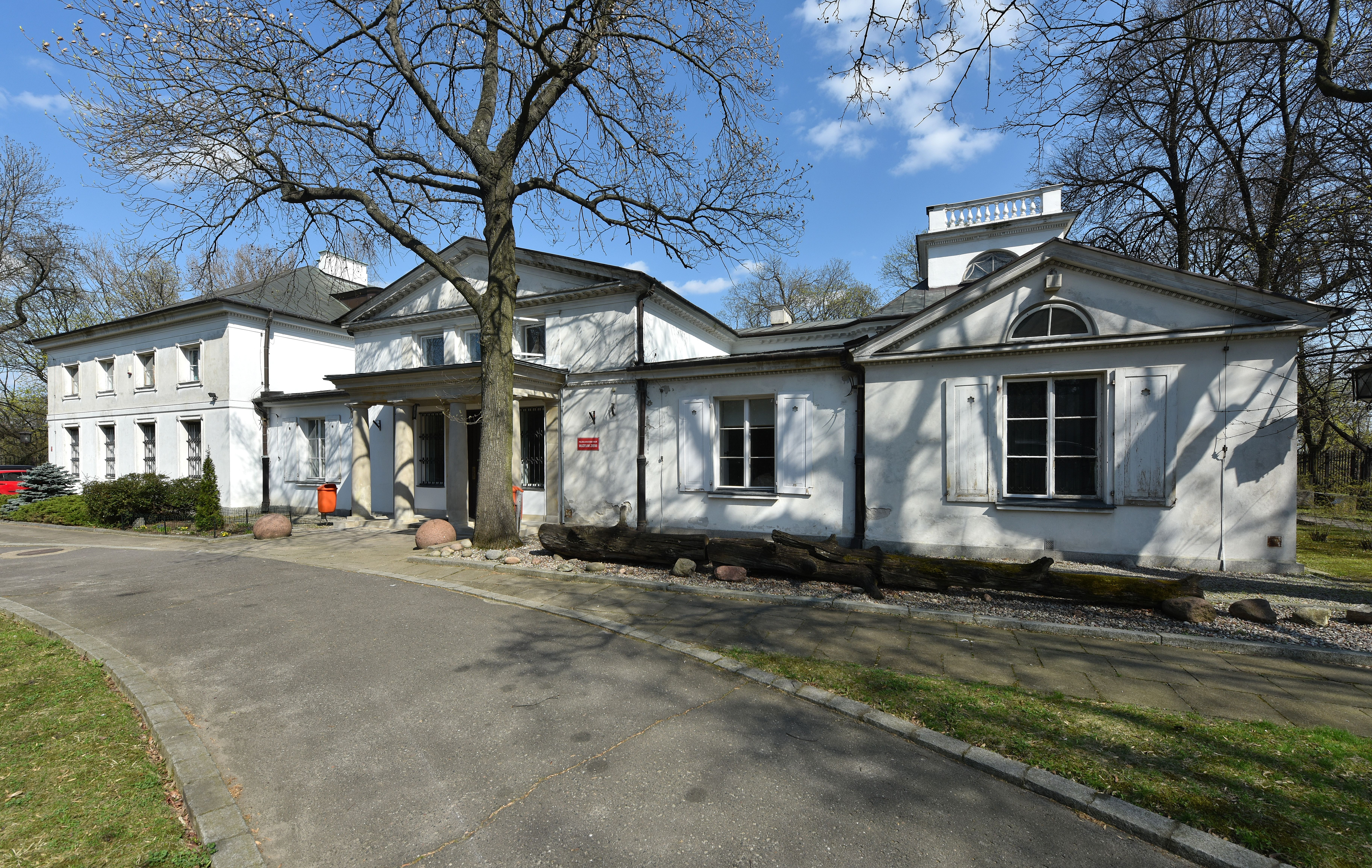
Museum of the Earth in Warsaw, Poland.

The Museum of the Earth in Warsaw (pol. Muzeum Ziemi PAN w Warszawie), established in 1948 and continuing a tradition initiated by Earth Museum Society back in 1932, has been operating within the structure of the Polish Academy of Sciences since 1959.

The Museum of the Earth is located in two historical buildings at Na Skarpie Avenue in the center of Warsaw, perched on high Vistula escarpment.

== Collection ==
The museum's collection comprises over 170,000 specimens and objects covering all geological sciences, with special regard to Polish minerals, precious stones, meteorites and rocks, Baltic amber, fossil flora and fauna and archival documents on the history of the Earth sciences. Particular noteworthy is its extensive collection of amber and other fossil resins, ranking among the largest natural-science collections of its type worldwide.

== Permanent exhibitions and Exhibit stands ==
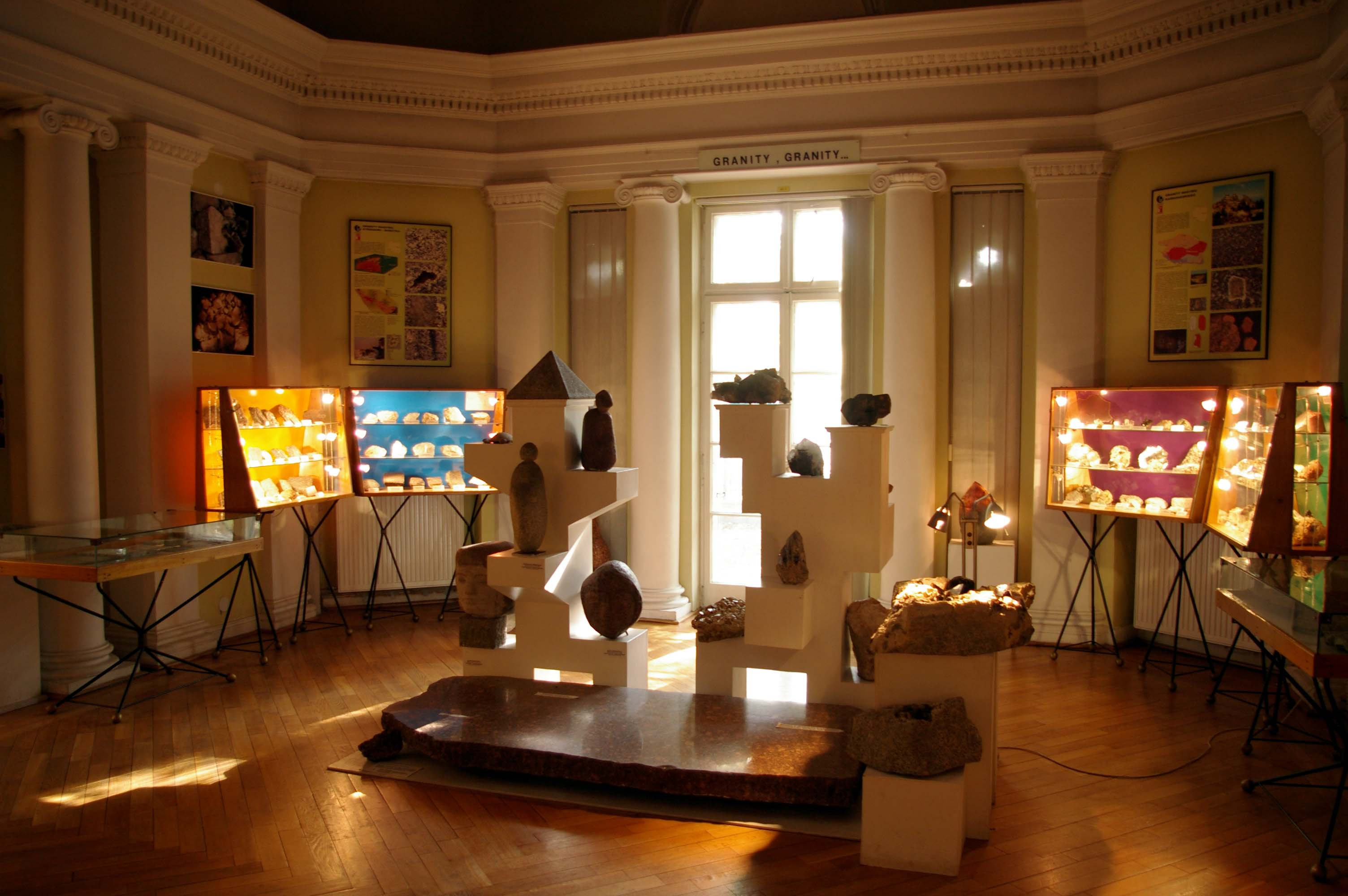
Permanent exhibition: Granites.

- Planet Earth
- Processes Shaping The Earth
- From The Earth's Geological Past
- Amber - From Liquid Resin To Ornamental Art
- Meteorites - Stones From The Sky
- Mineralogical Alphabet
- Large Mammals Of The Ice Age
- Granites
- Before Coal Was Formed
- Armored Lords of the Early Seas
- From the Archives Treasures of the Museum of the Earth
- Beginnings of Geology in Poland
- Earth Science Scholars on Postage Stamps

== Temporary exhibitions ==
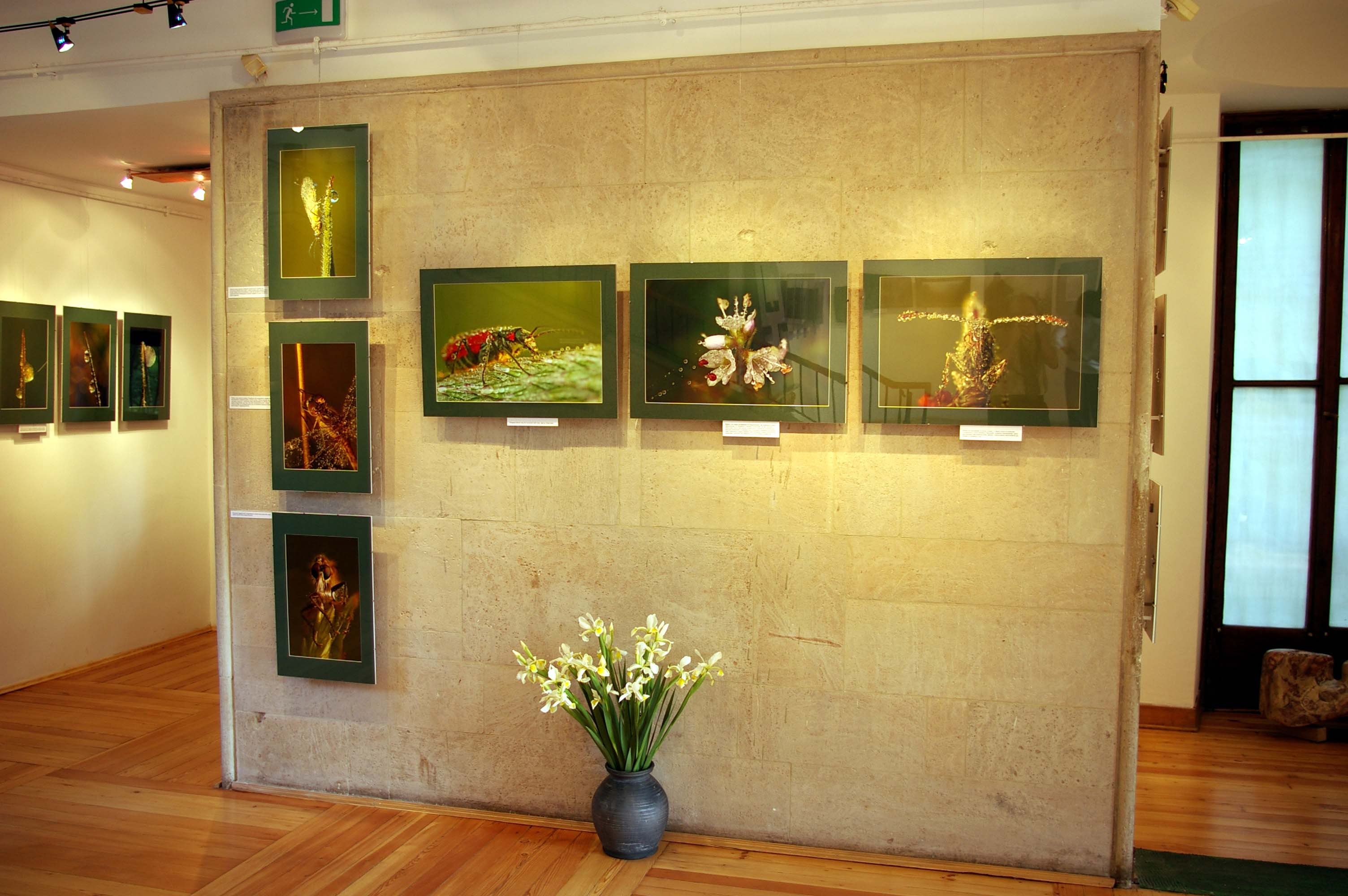
Especially expositions from series: Nature And Art.

- Especially expositions from series: Nature And Art

== Open-air exhibitions ==
- Monument Erratic Boulders
- Lapidarium - Building Stones In Poland

== Historical - exhibit point ==
- The Lasting Blood Of Warsaw's Insurgents - the traces of blood that are preserved on the marble steps of the stairs at the Pniewski villa at 27 Na Skarpie Av., where today Museum of the Earth has exhibit rooms, are an extraordinary and one of a kind venue for the remembrance of the Warsaw Uprising of 1944.
